= Ross Jennings =

New Zealand television producer (1944–2016)

Ross James Jennings (13 November 1944 – 25 March 2016) was a New Zealand actor, becoming one of New Zealand's most experienced television producers and directors, whose credits included The Mad Dog Gang, Close to Home, Moynihan, Inside Straight, feature film I Live with Me Dad, Australian TV series Special Squad and Acropolis Now, NZ's soap Homeward Bound, New Zealand's first reality series, Police Ten 7, Middlemore, Strip Search, Heroes and Melody Rules.

== Early life ==
Born in Hāwera in 1944, Jennings was raised by his mother in Taihape and Hāwera, his father having died during World War II.

== Acting career ==
As a member of the NZ Players and Children's Art Theatre, Ross Jennings toured NZ as an actor before being granted a QE2 Arts Council Grant to study acting in England where he worked at Salisbury Theatre and took on minor television and film roles, before returning to New Zealand in 1969, where his first child, a daughter was born.

He joined the NZBC in 1971, and the Drama Department within 18 months, mentored by producer Tony Issac.

He was appointed Head of Drama for TVNZ in the late 70's and left for Australia to work with Grundy Productions and finally to head Crawford Production's Development Department in 1982. During this period he produced his first feature film, I Live with Me Dad.

His return to New Zealand in 1987, after having 2 more children with second wife Carmel, saw him develop, create and produce some of New Zealand's most successful television amongst which was ‘Middlemore’, as well as NZ's longest running reality series, 'Police Ten 7', Heroes, which re-created everyday New Zealanders heroic stories and the hugely successful Strip Search.

He devised, created and produced TVNZ's highly successful 36 hr live to air Millenium Show as well as devising, creating and producing Māori Television's ANZAC Day show - a 17-hour, annual, live to air programme which played a large part in the resurgence of the ANZAC Day revitalisation in NZ, as well as becoming Māori Television's flagship programme.

In his final year, he wrote, co-directed, and produced the live, outdoor performance of The Passion Play staged at the Villa Maria winery in Māngere in 2015.

His final series, which he devised to demystify the running of NZ Parliament, Inside Parliament, was in production when he died.

=== Death and funeral ===
Ross Jennings died on 25 March 2016, aged 71. His death was preceded by that of his mother-in-law, Edna Peters, 96, who died the same day. He left behind his wife, Carmel Jennings, whom he ran his production company, Just The Ticket Productions with, also a television and film producer, and six children.

The family held funerals on consecutive days the following week at St Patrick's Roman Catholic Church in Pukekohe.

== Filmography ==
=== Film ===
Title	Year	Credited as			Notes
Title	Year	Director	Producer	Executive producer	Notes
The Scarecrow	1982	No	No	Yes	
I Live with Me Dad	1988	No	Yes	No	
Kahu & Maia	1994	No	Yes	No	
Once Were Warriors	1994	No	No	No	Script development

=== Television ===
The numbers in writing credits refer to the number of episodes.

Title	Year	Credited as			Network	Notes
Title	Year	Director	Producer	Executive producer	Network	Notes
Richard John Seddon - Premier	1973	No	No	No	NZBC	Television documentary film Assistant to the producer
Close to Home	1975–76	Yes (782)	Yes	No	Television One	Producer (782 episodes, 1975-76)
The Mad Dog Gang Meets Rotten Fred and Ratsguts	1978	Yes	Yes	No	Television One	Television film
All Things Being Equal	1978	Yes	No	No	Television One	
Skyways	1979	Yes (4)	No	No	Network 7	
The Mad Dog Gang Spooks Wilkie, Wink Wink and the Wobbler	1980	Yes	Yes	No	Television One	Television film Production assistant
Open File	1981	No	No	Yes		
Kingi's Story	1981	No	No	No		Television film Associate producer
Jocko	1981	No	No	Yes		
The Monster's Christmas	1981	No	No	No	Television One	Television film Associate producer
Loose Enz	1982	No	No	Yes	Television One	
Casualties of Peace	1983	No	No	Yes		Television film
Prisoner	1983–84	Yes (12)	No	No	Network Ten	
Special Squad	1984	No	Yes	No	Network Ten	Associate producer
Carson's Law	1984	Yes (2)	No	No	Network Ten	
Inside Straight	1984	Yes (1)	No	No	Television One	
Space Knights	1989	No	Yes	No	Channel 2	
Betty's Bunch	1990	No	No	Yes	Channel 2	
Homeward Bound	1992	Yes (2)	No	Yes	TV3	
Melody Rules	1994–95	No	Yes	No	TV3	
City Girls	2004	No	No	Yes	TV2	
Air Force	2005	No	No	Yes	TV One	Docuseries
Ghost Hunt	2005–06	No	No	Yes	TV2	
Wayne Anderson: Singer of Songs	2005	No	No	Yes	TV2	Documentary film
Redemption Hill	2006	No	No	Yes	TV2	
Wayne Anderson: Singer of Songs	2006	No	No	Yes	TV2	Mockumentary
Wayne Anderson: Glory Days	2009	No	No	Yes	Prime	Mockumentary
Life's a Riot	2009	No	No	Yes	TV One	Television film
