= 1975 in New Zealand television =

This is a list of New Zealand television-related event in 1975.

== Events ==
- 1 April – Television One commences broadcasting from the new Avalon studio complex.
- 12 May – Close to Home, New Zealand's second soap opera begins on Television One.
- 30 June – TV2 is launched.
- 5 July – Only a week after launching, TV2 stages the country's first Telethon, raising $400,000 for the St John Ambulance service.
- The New Zealand Broadcasting Corporation (NZBC) is divided into Radio New Zealand, Television One, based in Wellington and Dunedin, and TV2, based in Auckland and Christchurch.
- The New Zealand version of the popular children's education series Play School begins on Television One.
- Jennie Goodwin becomes the first female prime time news anchor in a Commonwealth country.

== Debuts ==
- 12 May – Close to Home (Television One) (1975–1983)
- The Games Affair (NZBC) (1975)
- Play School (Television One) (1975–1990)
- Ready to Roll (TV2) (1975–1987)

== Television shows ==
- Spot On (1973–1988)
- Close to Home (1975–1983)
- Play School (1975–1990)

== Ending this year ==
- The Games Affair (1975)
