= Judy Callingham =

New Zealand scriptwriter, presenter and journalist

Judy Callingham CNZM
- Occupations: Scriptwriter; television presenter; journalist; media training consultant
- Spouse: Brian Edwards
- Writing career
- Years active: 1962–

Judy Coralyn Sylvia Callingham CNZM is a New Zealand scriptwriter, television presenter and journalist. Since the 1970s, she has worked on numerous New Zealand television dramas including Close to Home, Homeward Bound, Duggan and Marlin Bay. She is a former deputy chair of NZ On Air, and together with her husband Brian Edwards runs a media training consultancy company.

== Early career and scriptwriting ==
In 1962, Callingham began working for the New Zealand Broadcasting Corporation in radio advertising, and in 1963 she became a journalist at the New Zealand Listener. She worked in journalism for television, radio and magazines for the next ten years, including reporting for the television shows Montage and Town and Around, time presenting weather forecasts, and three years spent as a journalism tutor at Wellington Polytechnic.

In 1974, she began writing television drama. She worked on almost 200 scripts for the soap opera Close to Home, and other shows she wrote for in the 1970s and 1980s included Gloss, Country GP, Open House and Peppermint Twist. In 1981 she wrote the play Pawn to Queen Two which was workshopped and performed by the Downstage Theatre.

In 1982, she wrote the television drama Casualties of Peace, inspired by her father's experience, which was nominated for best script at the New Zealand Feltex Awards. In 1989 she devised the live television show Missing, on which people were reunited with families and friends, and lobbied Jonathan Hunt for changes to the law that would make it possible for adopted children whose birth mothers had died to access family information and locate their family members.

Together with Michael A. Noonan she wrote for drama show Homeward Bound. She received the award for Best Writer of a Script for a Series/Serial at the 1993 GOFTA Awards for her work on the show. She worked on a range of other television shows during the 1990s, including notably for the sitcom version of The Billy T James Show, and received award nominations for the shows Duggan and Marlin Bay. Duggan actress Katie Wolfe described Callingham as having great empathy and understanding of female characters, and Callingham commented that she tried to write parts specifically for older actresses: "We have such a lot of good older actresses in this country who very seldom get good parts. It's something you can do as a female writer, you can say OK, I can think of four really good actresses between the age of 50 and 70, any of whom would have a ball in this role."

== Media work ==
In the 1990s, Callingham and her husband Brian Edwards began a media training company, and they co-wrote How to Survive and Win with the Media (2000). A review for the Evening Post described it as an "easy read, good natured, practical and encouraging", although noted that the book "is full of what most of us would regard as common sense". Callingham and Edwards have said that most of their clients are businesspeople and politicians.

Callingham and her husband provided media training to Helen Clark from the mid-1990s to the late 2000s, including after she became prime minister in 1999. They were credited for converting her into a capable television performer, including by encouraging her to soften her voice and ensuring that she appeared serious or smiled when appropriate. They also provided media training to ministers in her government. In 2007, journalist Tracy Watkins claimed "all new ministers are offered the Edwards-Callingham treatment". In 2011 it was reported that they had provided media training to Wellington mayor Celia Wade-Brown.

== Appointments and later career ==
Callingham was the president and chair of the New Zealand Writers Guild for three years in the 1990s, and in 2001 she became the first president of the New Zealand Writers Foundation. She represented New Zealand in policy and research at the International Affiliation of Writers Guilds. From 1999 to 2001, she was the chair of the New Zealand Academy of Film and Television Arts. In the 2001 Queen's Birthday Honours, Callingham was appointed a Companion of the New Zealand Order of Merit, for services to drama.

From 2002 to 2007, Calllingham sat on the board of NZ On Air, and from 2004 to 2007 was the board's deputy chair. ACT politician Rodney Hide criticised her appointment, asking whether it was "payback for this prime minister and other ministers' media training" (referring to the training offered by Callingham and her husband to Helen Clark). The criticism was rejected by Broadcasting Minister Steve Maharey. Another source of controversy was that Callingham was on the board at the time her husband applied for, and received, funding for a television show. She had, however, recused herself from the decision-making process in line with conflict-of-interest rules.

In 2013, Callingham graduated from the University of Auckland with a Bachelor of Arts degree with first-class honours in political studies. She is also a Fellow of Trinity College of Music in speech and drama.
