= John Bach =

New Zealand actor

- Born: 5 June 1946 (age 80); Garndiffaith, Monmouthshire, Wales
- Years active: 1975–present

John Bach (born 5 June 1946) is a Welsh-born New Zealand actor who has acted on stage, television and film over a period of more than four decades. Though born in the United Kingdom, he has spent most of his career living and working in New Zealand.

== Film career ==
International audiences are most likely to have seen Bach as the Gondorian Ranger Madril in the second and third movies of The Lord of the Rings film trilogy (2001–2003). His leading roles in New Zealand television include playing the titular Detective Inspector John Duggan in the Duggan telemovies and television series, one of the truckdriving brothers in series Roche, and time on long-running soap opera Close to Home. In 1992 he starred as Scottish inventor Alexander Graham Bell in the telemovie The Sound and the Silence. In 1999 he played the Earl of Sackville in an episode of the TV miniseries A Twist in the Tale.

Bach's Australian work includes science fiction series Farscape, playing Mike Power in the "based on a true story" mini-series The Great Bookie Robbery (1986), and as Sir Ian Hamilton in the 2015 TV miniseries Gallipoli.

In 2010, Bach appeared in the science fiction series This Is Not My Life as the sinister Harry Sheridan, as magistrate Titus Calavius in Spartacus: Blood and Sand and in an episode of Legend of the Seeker.

He appeared in several New Zealand films, including Utu, Carry Me Back, Goodbye Pork Pie, The Last Tattoo, Pallet on the Floor, Old Scores (in which he had a central role), and Beyond Reasonable Doubt.

In 2014, he performed as body double for Saruman in place of Christopher Lee, who was unable to fly to New Zealand for principal photography on The Hobbit film series.

He appeared as the emperor Marcus Aurelius in the first season of the 2016 Netflix drama series, Roman Empire. In 2021, he began a recurring role as Don on the comedy series Under the Vines, created by Erin White and starring Rebecca Gibney and fellow Lord of the Rings alum Charles Edwards.

In 2026, he appeared as an older version of British General Brian Horrocks in the documentary film Sgt. Haane.

== Filmography ==
=== Film ===
Year	Title	Role	Notes
1975	Richard Pearse	Jack Pearse	TV movie
1977	Wild Man	Barman	Feature film
1978	The Mad Dog Gang Meets Rotten Fred and Ratsguts	Wilkie	TV movie
1979	The Gathering	Lou	TV movie
1980	Goodbye Pork Pie	Snout	Feature film
1980	Beyond Reasonable Doubt		Feature film
1980	The Mad Dog Gang Spooks Wilkie, Wink Wink and the Wobbler	Wilkie	TV movie
1980	Sea Urchins	Harvey	TV movie
1981	Bad Blood	Bert Chopp	Feature film
1982	Battletruck	"Bone"	Feature film
1982	Carry Me Back	Winton	
1983	Wild Horses	Jack	TV movie
1983	Utu	Belcher	Feature film
1983	The Lost Tribe	Edward / Max Scarry	Feature film
1983	Prisoners	Bodell	Feature film
1983	Nearly No Christmas	King Penguin	TV movie
1984	Heart of the Stag	Shearer	
1984	Other Halves	Jim	Feature film
1984	Iris	Mike	TV movie
1984	Pallet on the Floor	Jack Voot	Feature film
1985	Lie of the Land	Gorrie	
1986	Dangerous Orphans	Desk Sergeant	Feature film
1988	Georgia	Karlin	Feature film
1990	Blood Oath	Major Roberts	Feature film
1991	The Sound and the Silence	Alexander Graham Bell	TV movie
1991	Old Scores	Lead role	Feature film
1993	Crimebroker	Frank MacPhee	TV movie
1993	Typhon's People	Daniel Harrington	TV miniseries/movie
1994	The Last Tattoo	Austin Leech	Feature film
1994	The Feds: Obsession	Rainer Bass	TV movie
1995	The Feds: Suspect	Rainer Bass	TV movie
1995	The Feds: Deception	Rainer Bass	TV movie
1995	The Feds: Abductions	Rainer Bass	TV movie
1995	The Feds: Seduction	Rainer Bass	TV movie
1995	The Feds: Terror	Rainer Bass	TV movie
1995	The Feds: Vengeance	Rainer Bass	TV movie
1996	The Feds: Betrayal	Rainer Bass	TV movie
1996	The Feds: Deadfall	Rainer Bass	TV movie
2000	Clare	Herbert Green	TV movie
2002	The Lord of the Rings: The Two Towers	Gondorian Ranger Madril	Feature film
2002	Der Liebe entgenen	Mr. Chapman	TV movie
2003	The Lord of the Rings: Return of the King	Gondorian Ranger Madril	Feature film
2004	Ike: Countdown to D-Day	Sir Trafford Leigh-Malloy	TV movie
2005	Kidnapped	Cluny	
2005	The Man who Couldn't Dance	Dancing Man	Short film
2007	The Tattooist	Lazlo McFadden	
2008	The Chronicles of Narnia: Prince Caspian	British Homeguard #1	Feature film
2009	Piece of My Heart	Mike	TV movie
2011	Rest for the Wicked	Frank	
2014	The Cure	Lionel Stanton	Feature film
2014	Nancy Wake, the White Mouse	Fiocca	TV movie
2014	The Hobbit	Saruman Body Double	Feature film
2014	The Light Harvester		Short film
2016	Judgement Tavern	The Judge	Short film
2016	The Light Between Oceans	Jock Johnson	Feature film
2019	Mistress Mercy	Judge Anderson	TV movie
2020	Zealandia	Man	Short film
2020	Reunion	Jack	Feature film
2022	The Ballard of Maddog Quinn	Grandpa Quinn	Short film
2026	Sgt. Haane	Brian Horrocks (elder)	Documentary

=== Television ===
Year	Title	Role	Notes
2026	The Brokenwood Mysteries	Phillip Craddock	TV Series, 1 episode
2025	Warren's Vortex	The Voice (narrator)	TV series, 6 episodes
2021–2023	Under the Vines	Don	TV series, 11 episodes
2020	The Sounds	Frank Cabbott	6 episodes
2017	Janet King	Graham King	TV series, 5 episodes
2016	Roman Empire	Marcus Aurelis	TV docuseries, 2 episodes
2016	Jack Irish	Michael Longmore	TV series, 5 episodes
2015	Gallipoli	Ian Hamilton	TV miniseries, 7 episodes
2014	Hope and Wire	Vernon	TV series, 1 episode
2013	Wentworth	Vinnie Holt	TV series, 2 episodes
2010	Spartacus	Calavius	5 episodes
2010	Legend of the Seeker	Herald	TV series, 1 episode
2010	This Is Not My Life	Harry Sheridan	5 episodes
2006	The Lost Children	Frank	TV series, 12 episodes
2005	Hercules	Crenon	TV series, 2 episodes
2004	Farscape: The Peacekeeper Wars	Einstein	TV miniseries, 2 episodes
2002–2003	Farscape	Einstein	TV series, 5 episodes
2000–2002	The Dark Knight	Du Bois	TV series, 6 episodes
2000	The Lost World	Balar	TV miniseries, 1 episode
2000	Tales of the South Seas	Miller	TV series, 1 episode
1997–1999	Duggan	John Duggan	TV series, 13 episodes
1999	Young Hercules	Zeus	TV series, 1 episode
1999	A Twist in the Tale	Earl of Sackville	1 episode
1998	The Day of the Roses	Tom Weir	TV miniseries, 2 episodes
1997	20,000 Leagues Under the Sea	Thierry	TV miniseries, 2 episodes
1995	Mysterious Island	Captain Nemo	TV series, 22 episodes
1995	Snowy River: The Mcgregor Saga	Jim O'Rourke	TV series, 1 episode
1994	Time Trax	Xavier	TV series, 1 episode
1994	High Tide	Boucher	TV series, 1 episode
1993	White Fang	Tom Cooper	TV series, 1 episode
1989–1992	The Ray Bradbury Theater	Lazlo	TV anthology series, 2 episodes
1992	Spender	Doorman	TV series, 1 episode
1991	Heroes II: The Return	Donald Davidson	TV series, 2 episodes
1991	Golden Fiddles	Walter Balfour	TV miniseries, 2 episodes
1990	The Paper Man	Phillip Cromwell	TV miniseries, 6 episodes
1989	The Heroes	Donald Davidson	TV miniseries
1988	Spit MacPhee	Jack Tree	TV miniseries, 4 episodes
1986	The Great Bookie Robbery	Mike Power	TV miniseries, 3 episodes
1985	Roche	Mick	TV series, 9 episodes
1984	Inside Straight	Bill McLean	TV series, 3 episodes
1975–1983	Close to Home	Tom Hearte	TV series, 784 episodes
1982	Loose Enz	Ron	TV series, 1 episode
1980	Mortimer's Patch	Kevin Cartwright	TV series, 1 episode
1978	Rachel	Dave	TV series
1977	The Governor	John Sheehan	TV series, 1 episode
1975	The Games Affair		TV series
