= Among the Cinders =

- Directed by: Rolf Hädrich
- Written by: Maurice Shadbolt (novel); Rolf Hädrich & John O'Shea (screen)
- Starring: Paul O'Shea; Amanda Jones; Derek Hardwick; Yvonne Lawley
- Cinematography: Rory O'Shea
- Release date: 1987
- Running time: 112 min.
- Countries: New Zealand; West Germany
- Language: English

Among the Cinders is a 1983 New Zealand-West German drama film directed by Rolf Hädrich and starring Paul O'Shea, Amanda Jones, Derek Hardwick and Yvonne Lawley. After a hunting accident in which his friend is killed (for which he blames himself) a boy (Nick) runs away from home and goes to live with his grandparents, where he matures into a man.

The film is based on the 1965 novel of the same name by New Zealand author Maurice Shadbolt, who appears in the film as Frank Flinders.

== Premise ==
Nick Flinders is a lonely and moody youth. The one friend he has is a Maori boy, Sam Waikai. While they are hunting together in the bush, Sam is accidentally killed. Nick is injured, but he feels guilty and responsible for his friend's death. With the help of his eccentric grandfather, Nick learns about life and love.

== Cast ==
- Paul O'Shea ... Nick Flinders
- Amanda Jones ... Glenys Appleby
- Derek Hardwick ... Hubert Flinders, grandfather
- Yvonne Lawley ... Beth Flinders, grandmother
- Rebecca Gibney ... Sally
- Bridget Armstrong ... Helga Flinders, mother
- Maurice Shadbolt ... Frank Flinders
- Marcus Broughton ... Derek Flinders
- Christopher Hansard ... Michael
- Ricky Duff ... Sam Waikai
- Harata Solomon ... Mrs. Waikai
- Michael Haigh ... Sergeant Crimmins
- Peter Baldock ... Clergyman
- Cherie O'Shea ... Nurse
- Tom Poata ... Ahu
- Ngaire Woods ... Kate
- Des Kelly ... Fred
- Sal Criscillo ... Photographer
- Sela Apera ... Tera
- Helena Ross ... Glenys' mother
- Tamata Paua Bailey ... Māori orator
- Lorna Langford ... Postmistress
- David Hamilton ... Photograpjher's assistant
- Ken Nicholas ... Golfer
- Lil and Puti Te Runa ... Golfer's family
- Cindy Turipa ... Sam's sister
- Shelley Simpson ... model
- Jill Ann Davis ... model
- Brett Tucker

== Production and screening ==
The film was made in 1983, but not submitted to the New Zealand censor until 1987. It has screened on New Zealand television and often on German television. It was shown at the 1984 Karlovy Vary Film Festival, Czechoslovakia, and Derek Hardwick got a Special Jury Prize.
