= Gone Up North for a While =

1972 New Zealand film

- Directed by: Paul Maunder
- Written by: Paul Maunder
- Produced by: Ron Bowie
- Starring: Denise Maunder; Paul Holmes
- Cinematography: Lynton Diggle
- Edited by: Sam Pillsbury
- Production company: National Film Unit
- Distributed by: New Zealand Broadcasting Corporation
- Release date: 1972
- Running time: 37 minutes
- Country: New Zealand
- Language: English

Gone Up North for a While is a 1972 New Zealand film directed by Paul Maunder.

== Synopsis ==
Patricia Davis falls pregnant and goes against the advice of her family and unsympathetic welfare authorities by keeping her baby. This is followed by misery and hardship.

== Cast ==
- Denise Maunder as Patricia Davis
- Marian Rowe as Nurse
- Paul Holmes as Boyfriend
- Grant Tilly as Doctor
- Jean Betts as Girlfriend
- Russell Duncan
- Anne England
- Dell King as Welfare officer
- Jacqui Jones
- Michael Haigh as Personnel officer
- Ngaire Horton as Woman
- Darien Takle as Nurse
- John Anderson
- Gael Anderson
- Bruce Briggs
- Jennifer Ward-Lealand as Child
- Conrad Lealand

== Reviews ==
This film stirred up public debate for the Domestic Purposes Benefit for single mothers - "...is an important part of our screen history...". The film won the award for best drama and the arts at the 1973 Feltex Television Awards. It was shown at the 1974 Chicago International Film Festival.
