= Chicken (1996 film) =

- Directed by: Grant Lahood
- Written by: Grant Lahood
- Produced by: John Keir
- Starring: Bryan Marshall; Martyn Sanderson
- Cinematography: Allen Guilford
- Edited by: John Gilbert
- Music by: Michelle Scullion
- Release date: April 29, 1996
- Running time: 90 min
- Country: New Zealand
- Language: English

Chicken is a 1996 New Zealand film written and directed by Grant Lahood. It was his debut feature after a series of short films. It was the first New Zealand feature film of the year. It commenced shooting in Wellington in July 1995. It had a Wellington premier on Monday 29 April before opening nationally on Friday.

Faded 60s pop star Dwight Serrento is reduced to advertising for a fast food chicken chain. Chicken fan Zeke is angered and sets out to kill him but bodyguard Colette gets in the way. Meanwhile, manager Bryce Tilfer decides to fake Serrento's death for publicity.

== Cast ==
- Bryan Marshall as Dwight Serrento
- Martyn Sanderson as Bryce Tilfer
- Cliff Curtis as Zeke
- Ellie Smith as Colette Milham
- Jed Brophy as Will Tilfer
- Claire Waldron as Vicky Serrento
- Joan Dawe as Betty Junket
- Sean Feehan as Otis Milham

The Chicks, Ray Columbus, Shane, Alison Mau and Dylan Taite all make appearances as themselves.

== Reception ==
Russell Baillie in Sunday Star Times says " it becomes hard work going along for the ride as Chicken swings from a caper comedy to a heavily convoluted one." He finishes his review "But it feels like a nervous first long-playing effort from Lahood. One that's overwritten and over-stuffed, desperate to be "black" and "zany" when just plain old "funny" would have done nicely." In the Dominion Matt Johnson wrote "The result is a laboured dark comedy whose loose ends (what happened to Dwight's real breasts?) are far more likely to leave you in the dark than in stitches. Certainly, most of the clucking in my aisle involved people excitedly recognising local landmarks _ a pubescent phase New Zealand cinema should have outgrown shortly after Goodbye Pork Pie."

Sunday Star Times' Mark Knowles said of the video release "If this piece of unredeemed nonsense didn't happen to be New Zealand's latest, it likely wouldn't even rate discussion."

Helen Martin in New Zealand film, 1912-1996 wrote "Most successful is the film's neat juggling act, which has it lampooning animal rights activists while also asserting that activists have a lot to be heated up about. But, in aiming at a Raising Arizona style of black comedy, Chicken is frantic where it should be deadpan. Although its characters and story are cartoon, the approach to the overloaded script is scattergun, and few of the characters manage to arouse much sympathy."
