= Rowley Habib =

New Zealand writer (1933–2016)

- Rore Hapipi
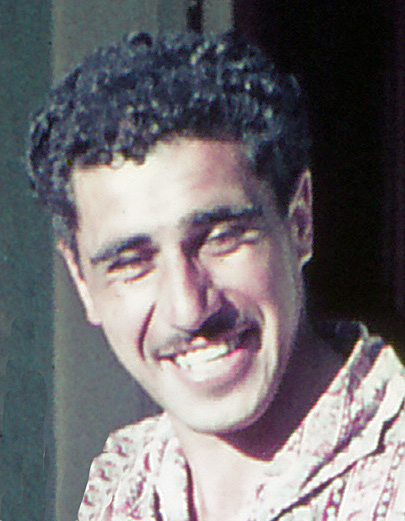
- Habib in 1969
- Born: 24 April 1933
- Died: 3 April 2016 (aged 82)

Rowley Habib (24 April 1933 – 3 April 2016), also known as Rore Hapipi, was a New Zealand poet, playwright, and writer of short stories and television scripts.

== Biography ==
Of Lebanese and Māori descent, Habib identified with the Ngāti Tūwharetoa iwi. He was educated at Te Aute College and then attended teachers' training college for a time, before working in a variety of jobs including in a bookshop, timber mills, freezing works, and on hydroelectric dam construction sites.

He was the first Māori to write an original television drama: his 1979 work The Gathering looked at tensions around an elderly woman's tangihanga.

He also wrote the play Death of the Land in 1976, a courtroom drama which sets in conflict opinions about the proposed sale of a block of Māori ancestral land. This play marks a beginning point for contemporary Māori theatre; the company Te Ika a Maui Players was formed to present it, which they did around the country in community halls, and marae.

The 1978 television adaptation of the play includes footage of the 1975 Māori Land March and was the first television drama written by a Māori person. Habib's television drama The Protesters won the award for best script at the 1983 New Zealand Feltex Awards. The cast of The Protesters included Merata Mita, Jim Moriarty, Billy T. James and Don Selwyn.

The Taki Rua theatre company produced a number of works by Habib. His Nga morehu and Tupuna premiered as a double bill in 1987, and Fragments of a childhood the following year.

In the field of short story writing, from 1956 to 1971 Habib was a regular contributor to Te Ao Hou / The New World, a magazine for Māori.

In 1984, Habib was awarded the Katherine Mansfield Menton Fellowship. In 2013, Creative New Zealand awarded him a Ngā Tohu a Tā Kingi Ihaka Te Waka Toi Award in recognition of his lifetime of service to Māori arts, describing his play Death of the Land as a "landmark in the development of Māori theatre."

Habib died on 3 April 2016.

== Selected works ==
=== Television scripts ===
- 1976 – Death of the Land (aired in 1978)
- 1979 – The Gathering
- 1983 – The Protesters

=== Poetry ===
- 2006– Poetry anthology, The Raw Men. O-a-Tia Publishers

=== Plays ===
- 1976 - The death of the land
