= Yvonne Lawley =

New Zealand actress

Yvonne Lawley OBE
- Born: Joyce Yvonne Watson; 4 December 1913
- Died: 21 May 1999 (aged 85); Auckland, New Zealand
- Occupation: Actor

Joyce Yvonne Lawley OBE (née Watson, 4 December 1913 – 21 May 1999) was a New Zealand actor.

== Biography ==
Lawley began acting in her teens, and was sailing to England to attend the Royal Academy of Dramatic Art (RADA) when she met her future husband—an engineer—and instead spent ten years in Calcutta, India where he was stationed during World War II. Back in New Zealand, she took some small roles in theatre, television and radio, but her acting career was secondary to her family.

She appeared in the 1976 television adaptation of The God Boy, and in an episode of the anthology series Winners & Losers entitled "Blues for Miss Laverty". In 1983, she appeared in the film Among the Cinders and Constance in 1984. When her husband died in the mid-1980s, Lawley began to devote more time to acting. Her only lead role in a feature film was in 1990's Ruby and Rata, directed by Gaylene Preston. Immediately after filming this role, she flew to Australia to play a smaller role as the domineering mother of Sam Neill's character in the film Death in Brunswick. For much of the 1990s, she was a mainstay of New Zealand television, appearing in Shortland Street, Gloss, and American series filmed in New Zealand such as The Tommyknockers, Hercules: The Legendary Journeys and Xena: Warrior Princess.

Lawley was appointed an Officer of the Order of the British Empire, for services to the performing arts, in the 1995 New Year Honours.

She died on 21 May 1999 in Auckland.
