= High Country (1980 film) =

- Directed by: Mark DeFriest
- Written by: Julian Dickon; Earle Spencer
- Produced by: Mark DeFriest
- Starring: Bruce Allpress; Derek Hardwick; Peter McCauley
- Cinematography: Peter Hudson
- Edited by: Michael Bennett
- Music by: William Southgate
- Release date: May 16, 1980
- Running time: 75 min
- Country: New Zealand
- Language: English

High Country is a 1980 New Zealand television film. It was based on a script for a TV series, by Dick Shelton, tentatively titled Tantalus Range. It combined the first two episodes of the six written into one self contained telemovie. It was filmed at Haldon Station beginning in March 1979. It was a "Friday Play" shown on Television One in May 1980. It was spun off into a series Jocko, with production beginning before the film aired.

After 35 years a rancher decides to sell on his property to a younger buyer. His corrupt manager is stealing stock, complicating the situation. A roving musterer tries to help out.

== Cast ==
- Bruce Allpress as Jocko
- Derek Hardwick as Sam Barnett
- Peter McCauley as James Cameron
- Kathryn Rawlings as Carol Barnett
- Grant Tilly as Clive Blackburn
- Jeffrey Thomas as Jack White
