= Sons for the Return Home =

1979 New Zealand film

- Directed by: Paul Maunder
- Written by: Paul Maunder
- Based on: 1973 book by Albert Wendt
- Produced by: Don Blakeney
- Starring: Uelese Petaia; Fiona Lindsay; Moira Walker
- Cinematography: Alun Bollinger
- Music by: Malcolm Smith
- Production companies: New Zealand Film Commission; National Film Unit; Pacific Films
- Distributed by: New Zealand Film Commission
- Release date: 1979
- Running time: 117 minutes
- Country: New Zealand
- Language: English

Sons for the Return Home is a 1979 New Zealand film directed by Paul Maunder. The film is based on the 1973 book by Albert Wendt.

== Synopsis ==
A romance develops between Sione a Samoan and Sarah a white middle class New Zealander. They each finds the other's culture hard to adjust to with friends and family not being supportive, especially when she becomes pregnant.

== Cast ==
- Uelese Petaia as Sione
- Fiona Lindsay as Sarah
- Moira Walker as Sione's Mother
- Lani Tupu Snr as Sione's Father
- Amalamo Tanielu as Mallie
- Alan Jervis Wilks as Sarah's Father
- Anne Flannery as Sarah's Mother
- Malama Masina as Receptionist
- Sean Duffy as Sarah's First Lover
- Antony Groser as Headmaster
- Desmond Kelly as Man in Rubbish Dump
- Eric Kemeys as Alkie
- Peleti Lima as Sione aged 15
- George Mxlanga as African
- Richard Newman as Cockney
- Mark Prain as Student at Party
- Don Selwyn as Man in Taupo Pub
- Fou Simpson as Old Lady at Graveside
- Wendell Sisnett as West Indian
- Bill Smith as Scotsman
- Lesley Stevens as Friend at Taupo
- Debbie Tait as Student at Party
- Ewen Upston as Policeman

== Reviews ==
Uelese Petaia shared a Best Actor Award with Al Pacino at the 1980 Karlovy Vary International Film Festival.
