= The Lost Tribe (1985 film) =

- Directed by: John Laing
- Written by: John Laing
- Produced by: Gary Hannam; John Laing
- Starring: John Bach; Darien Takle; Don Selwyn; Martyn Sanderson; Emma Takle; Ian Watkin; Terry Connolly; Adele Chapman; Christopher Mills
- Cinematography: Thomas Burstyn
- Edited by: Phil McDonald
- Music by: Dave Fraser
- Production companies: Meridian Films; Film Investment Corporation of New Zealand; New Zealand Film Commission
- Distributed by: Amalgamated Theatres
- Release date: October 1983 (Spain)
- Running time: 114 minutes
- Country: New Zealand
- Language: English

The Lost Tribe is a 1985 New Zealand horror film directed by John Laing. Starring John Bach and Darien Takle, it follows a man and his sister-in-law journeying into a mysterious island inhabited by the tribe Huwera Maori. It was produced in 1982 but not theatrically released in New Zealand until 1985.

== Plot ==
Anthropologist Max Scarry (John Bach) vanishes while researching the reclusive Huwera Maori tribe on a remote Fjordland island. Authorities suspect foul play when they discover a murdered woman and witnesses identify someone fitting his description as the last person she was seen with.

Max’s partner, Ruth Scarry (Darien Takle), teams up with his identical twin brother, Edward Scarry (also John Bach), to unravel the mystery. The police become suspicious of Edward but allow him to voyage to the eerie island, where he stays in Max's cabin.

The night after their arrival, the couple endures a series of supernatural occurrences: disembodied voices, unsettling tribal symbols, and aggressive attempts by the island’s inhabitants to deter them—suggesting a fiercely guarded secret harboring deep spiritual power. Their paranoia escalates as Edward begins to unravel, his grip on reality slipping in the oppressive isolation.

Ruth retreats to the mainland on the following day, but Edward stays, still searching for his brother. She stays in a hotel on the mainland with her young daughter, who has visions of what's happening on the island. Edward's mental state continues to deteriorate, destroying a dig site and burning documenting Max's findings.

During the night a disheveled Max emerges from a hidden entrance in the cabin and confronts Edward. They get into a fight, with Edward shooting him, although it seemingly has no effect. Max then strangles his brother to death, displaying his corpse in an underground shrine. In the morning he returns to the mainland under the identity of Edward, fooling the police and boat captain, although not his wife and child.

== Cast ==
- John Bach as Edward / Max Scarry
- Darien Takle as Ruth Scarry
- Don Selwyn as Sergeant Swain
- Martyn Sanderson as Bill Thorne
- Emma Takle as Katy
- Ian Watkin as Mears
- Terry Connolly as Inspector Ford
- Adele Chapman as Eileen Armstrong
- Christopher Mills as Detective Sergeant James
- Joanne Simpson as Louise
- Alex Aitchison as Ramsay (credited as Alex Atchison)
- Nancy Renwick as Mrs. Ball
- Sarah Ingram as Sandra Merrill
- Keith Aberdein as Edward / Max Scarry's Body Double

== Production ==
The Lost Tribe marked acclaimed New Zealand director John Laing's second directorial effort. In addition, Laing wrote the script of the film and served as producer. Thomas Burstyn signed on as cinematographer. Principal photography ended in 1982.

== Release ==
The film was only released in 1985. It had earlier on won the critics' approval after winning awards at both the 1983 Sitges Film Festival and the Orleans Film Festival. It was screened for some time in September 1985 at the Berkeley Art Museum and Pacific Film Archive (BAM/PFA)'s New Zealand Cinema. In evaluating the film, John Parker of Metro concluded that "[i]t is impossible to say much more without spoiling a very fine movie with an intriguing story for you to find out for yourselves".

== Reception ==
On Rotten Tomatoes, The Lost Tribe holds no critic reviews and remains unrated, while audience ratings stand at 15 % based on over 250 votes, suggesting generally negative viewer sentiment.

Academic commentary emphasized the film's distinctive use of landscape as a Gothic element. A scholarly paper on New Zealand horror cinema highlighted The Lost Tribe as “one of the few instances in New Zealand horror cinema in which caves or holes are used for Gothic effect”

Despite its visual strengths, some critics and viewers found the story’s progression slow and ambiguous. EOFFTV’s review remarked that it “isn’t a film that’s in any particular hurry to get anywhere,” though it acknowledged that it “deserves a wider audience”.

The film garnered early acclaim at genre festivals. It won awards at the 1983 Sitges Film Festival and the Orleans Film Festival, though it struggled to find wider distribution and received only limited theatrical and video releases outside New Zealand.
