= Gloss (TV series) =

- Created by: Rosemary McLeod
- Starring: Ilona Rodgers; Lisa Chappell; Simon Prast; Miranda Harcourt; Geoff Dolan; Peter Elliott; Andy Anderson
- Opening theme: "Gloss" by Beaver
- Composer: Stephen McCurdy
- Country of origin: New Zealand
- Original language: English
- No. of series: 3
- No. of episodes: 55

Production
- Producer: Janice Finn

Original release
- Network: Channel 2
- Release: 13 August 1987 – 17 January 1990

Gloss is a television drama series in New Zealand that screened from 1987 to 1990. The series was about the lives of the rich, famous and fashionable people involved with a fashion magazine owned by the Redfern family.

It was a starting point for many actors who went on to many productions in New Zealand, Australia and around the world including Temuera Morrison, Miranda Harcourt, Peter Elliott, Lisa Chappell, Danielle Cormack and Kevin Smith. Many of them would go on to star in Shortland Street.

Produced in-house by the TVNZ drama department, the show was the brainchild of scriptwriter Rosemary McLeod and producer Janice Finn. Other writers included James Griffin, who went on to write Outrageous Fortune, Ian Mune, Judy Callingham, Liddy Holloway, Judith Fyfe, Debra Daley and Ross Hastings. Directors included Chris Bailey, Aileen O'Sullivan, Murray Reece, Wayne Tourell and Peter Sharp.

The show's title theme song was performed by Beaver Morrison.

The show has not been rescreened since its original screening (nor is it available on DVD), but selected extracts have been made available for viewing on NZ On Screen.

== Cast ==
=== Major characters ===
- Ilona Rodgers as Maxine Redfern
- Lisa Chappell as Chelsea Redfern
- Donna Clark as Caro Redfern
- Peter Elliott as Rex Thorne/Redfern
- Miranda Harcourt as Gemma Stace/Redfern
- Michael Keir-Morrissey as Bradley Redfern (credited as Michael Morrissey)
- Yvonne Lawley as Olivia Redfern
- Simon Prast as Alistair Redfern

=== Minor characters ===
- Andy Anderson as Matt Winter
- Christine Bartlett as Bridget
- Brigitte Berger as Alexandra
- Raewyn Blade as Poppy Broadbent
- Alistair Browning as Paul Harper
- Danielle Cormack as Tania Veitch
- Gary Day as Aaron Sloane/Bryce Redfern
- Geoff Dolan as Neil Palmer
- Sean Duffy as Campbell
- Mark Ferguson as Giles Mitcalfe
- !Ross Girven as Chris Dunbar-Jones
- Paul Gittins as Julian
- Gordon Harcourt as Matthew Stace (Gemma's brother)
- Ian Harcourt as Carter 'Panic' Crosby
- Kate Harcourt as Mrs Stace (Gemma's mother)
- Derek Hardwick as Sam
- Freddie Hemara as Mark
- Bill Johnson as Mr Stace (Gemma's father)
- Phil Keoghan as Hamish
- Jay Laga'aia as Simon
- Pania Lassey as Pania
- Nathaniel Lees as Phil
- Jennifer Ludlam as Cheryl Gravestock
- Judy McIntosh as Jessica Dunbar-Jones
- Mark Maiden as Greg
- Temuera Morrison as Sean Mitchell
- Geeling Ng as Jasmine Sage
- Craig Parker as Justin Grigg
- Sylvia Rands as Maria Klein
- Kerry Smith as Magda McGrath
- Kevin Smith as Damien Vermeer
- Stephen Tozer as Reid
- Susan Trainor as Melissa Cartwright
- Davina Whitehouse as Dorothy Dunbar-Jones

== Episodes ==
Season	Episodes	Originally released	
Season	Episodes	First released	Last released
1	18	13 August 1987	10 December 1987
2	13	21 June 1988	13 September 1988
3	24	9 August 1989	17 January 1990

=== Season 1 (1987) ===
The first series of Gloss was broadcast on Network Two on Thursdays at 8pm from August through December 1987, and consisted of 18 episodes.

Episode 1.01 (Thursday 13 August 1987) — written by Rosemary McLeod, directed by Chris Bailey
There's a Redfern wedding underway and under wraps. What would happen if Maxine (Ilona Rodgers) found out is too horrible to contemplate. Gloss's big story had a question mark hanging over it and Gemma Stace (Miranda Harcourt) is trying to get grips with the big city.

Episode 1.02 (Thursday 20 August 1987) — written by Jeffrey Thomas, directed by Wayne Tourell
What will Maxine do? Brad (Michael Keir-Morrissey) and Caro's (Donna Clark) marriage has got off to a less than certain beginning, Gemma's first assignment turns out to be more than she bargained for and Chelsea (Lisa Chappell) is proving to be quite a handful.

Episode 1.03 (Thursday 27 August 1987) — written by Debra Daley, directed by Gregory Rood
Maxine decides that Gloss needs a more positive image but someone forgets to tell Chelsea, there's a new magazine on the horizon and Maxine has a little surprise for Olivia (Yvonne Lawley).

Episode 1.04 (Thursday 3 September 1987) — written by Debra Daley, directed by Gregory Rood
Brad tries to bribe his way into Chelsea's good books with disastrous results, Gloss has some new competition and Gemma is learning the hard way.

Episode 1.05 (Thursday 10 September 1987) — written by Charlie Strachan, directed by Chris Bailey
Maxine has always regarded hate mail as an occupational hazard but this is getting out of control, Olivia has to pull a few strings and Brad's business dealings could have an adverse effect on his marriage.

Episode 1.06 (Thursday 17 September 1987) — written by Rosemary McLeod, directed by Wayne Tourell
Maxine takes Caro on a lunch date that is not all it seems, Chelsea is having Rex Thorne (Peter Elliott) trouble and Gemma agonises over the agony aunt.

Episode 1.07 (Thursday 24 September 1987) — written by Jeffrey Thomas, directed by Aileen O'Sullivan
There is a new issue of Electra, one that contains an unpleasant surprise for Maxine, Brad's business ambitions suffer a blow and Gemma is driven to seek solace in strange quarters.

Episode 1.08 (Thursday 1 October 1987) — written by Charlie Strachan, directed by Peter Barrett
It's Chelsea's birthday party and the storm clouds gather on the horizon, Maxine digs up some dirt on Caro and Gemma is having relationship problems.

Episode 1.09 (Thursday 8 October 1987) — written by Charlie Strachan, directed by Gregory Rood
The birthday party descends into a seething mass of accusations and recriminations, Gemma's big story has alarm bells ringing in the Redfern empire and Greg (Mark Maiden) returns to the scene of the crime.

Episode 1.10 (Thursday 15 October 1987) — written by Debra Daley, directed by Chris Bailey
Caro and Brad's marriage faces it biggest test and Maxine is waiting in the wings, Alistair (Simon Prast) and Sam (Derek Hardwick) conspire and Gemma is made an offer she can't refuse.

Episode 1.11 (Thursday 22 October 1987) — written by Liddy Holloway, directed by Aileen O'Sullivan
Brad and Caro reach an all-time low or do they? Gemma learns a thing or two about ambition and Jasmine (Geeling Ng) lands Gloss in a whole heap of trouble.

Episode 1.12 (Thursday 29 October 1987) — written by Rosemary McLeod, directed by Peter Barrett
The scent of seduction is in the air, Gloss hits the pits as the vultures circle and Maxine has a plan for Alistair.

Episode 1.13 (Thursday 5 November 1987) — written by Charlie Strachan, directed by Gregory Rood
Crunch time for Brad and Caro, but where's Brad? Gemma does a spot of investigative journalism, Campbell (Sean Duffy) has a rather dubious business proposal but Alistair has other things on his mind.

Episode 1.14 (Thursday 12 November 1987) — written by Judy Callingham, directed by Wayne Tourell
The strangest people are interested in Olivia's fate, Alistair gets a bit too greedy for his own good and a change of direction for Gloss.

Episode 1.15 (Thursday 19 November 1987) — written by Debra Daley, directed by Aileen O'Sullivan
Alistair stumbles from crisis to crisis, fast becoming aware that his life is disappearing before his very eyes, Rex makes his big move as Maxine prepares to clip his wings and with Brad at the helm will the Redfern family survive?

Episode 1.16 (Thursday 26 November 1987) — written by Judy Callingham, directed by Peter Barrett
Olivia's got a little secret, one that the rest of the family may not be overly thrilled about, tension runs high at the Gloss office as the showdown with Phoenix looms and a dinner party at the Redferns has more than its share of surprise guests.

Episode 1.17 (Thursday 3 December 1987) — written by Liddy Holloway, directed by Gregory Rood
The Redfern family has been stood completely on its head, wedded bliss for Alistair? Gloss without Maxine? Meanwhile, Brad is haunted by the past and Rex is toying with his newfound power.

Episode 1.18 (Thursday 10 December 1987) — written by Rosemary McLeod, directed by Wayne Tourell
Will Gemma make it down the aisle? Is Rex's world looking a bit on the shaky side? And where is Bridget? Alistair and Gemma's wedding day looks set to rock the foundations of the Redfern family.

=== Gloss: The First Year ===
Screening in June 1988, Gloss: The First Year was a two part retrospective of the first series of Gloss.

Part 1 (Thursday 2 June 1988)
Arch rival Rex is undermining Maxine and the new edition of Gloss is a pale shadow of its former self, Brad and Caro's fairytale marriage is in trouble and Alistair is among the first to offer condolences.

Part 2 (Thursday 9 June 1988)
Olivia has a new grandson and Maxine is about to get a new daughter-in-law, has Alistair bitten off more than he can chew and who is Aaron Sloane (Gary Day)?

=== Season 2 (1988) ===
The second series (commonly known as Gloss II) was broadcast on Network Two on Tuesdays at 9pm from June through September 1988, and consisted of 13 episodes.

Episode 2.01 (Tuesday 21 June 1988) — written by Rosemary McLeod, directed by Aileen O'Sullivan
A month has passed since the disaster of the wedding, but the scandal still haunts the Redfern clan. What has become of Gemma? What surprises will Maxine spring on the family this time round? Why has Aaron Sloane come back from the dead? The saga continues.

Episode 2.02 (Tuesday 28 June 1988) — written by Jeffrey Thomas, directed by Murray Reece
Aaron Sloane or Bryce Redfern? Brad's paranoia is growing. Rex's life is not all it could be as he is forced to do some serious grovelling. Maxine, the perfect mother, takes the kids into the country with surprising results.

Episode 2.03 (Tuesday 5 July 1988) — written by Liddy Holloway, directed by Tony Holden
It's a red letter day for the Redferns. The family business goes public, there's a new career for Chelsea, Alistair faces up to his latest acquisition and Rex has a less than happy time but what does Maxine have to celebrate?

Episode 2.04 (Tuesday 12 July 1988) — written by Ian Mune, directed by Peter Barrett
As the wheelings and dealings around the public float of the Redfern Group continue. A new business deal for Rex has its hidden side, and Maxine's life is coming up roses, or is it.

Episode 2.05 (Tuesday 19 July 1988) — written by Liddy Holloway, directed by Aileen O'Sullivan
The family gathers as the repercussions of the tragedy spread. Rex faces up to his newfound status and Magda has an intriguing night out but Maxine grows increasingly troubled at the thought of recent events.

Episode 2.06 (Tuesday 26 July 1988) — written by Rosemary McLeod, directed by Murray Reece
A death in the family. As the day of the funeral draws near the Redfern family begins to fall apart. Was it suicide? Caro thinks so. Was it murder? Maxine isn't sure. Chelsea, meanwhile, seeks solace in the strangest places.

Episode 2.07 (Tuesday 2 August 1988) — written by Ian Mune, directed by Janice Finn
Down, but certainly not out. Rex's revenge gives Maxine very little time to enjoy herself but the worst is yet to come, Alistair's domestic problems aren't helped by a surprise visitor, the path of true love is not running smooth for Sean and Magda and time may be running out.

Episode 2.08 (Tuesday 9 August 1988) — written by Judy Callingham, directed by Peter Barrett
Revelation time. Maxine closes in on her prey but this beast is most dangerous when cornered, there is a surprise for Sean (Temuera Morrison) and Magda, a new footing for Alistair and Sophie (????) and a mysterious visitor at the Gloss office.

Episode 2.09 (Tuesday 16 August 1988) — written by Lex Van Os, directed by Aileen O'Sullivan
Viva Maxine. While she exercises her newfound power in a most unusual way Rex broods, a decision for Magda, temptation for Alistair and Chelsea learns that there is more to the modelling business than meets the eye.

Episode 2.10 (Tuesday 23 August 1988) — written by Ian Mune, directed by Janice Finn
Down but certainly not out. Rex's revenge gives Maxine very little time to enjoy herself but the worst is yet to come, Alistair's domestic problems aren't helped by a surprise visitor, the path of true love is not running smooth for Sean and Magda and time may be running out.

Episode 2.11 (Tuesday 30 August 1988) — written by Liddy Holloway, directed by Peter Sharp
The world is truly coming up roses for Rex, even more so as fate deals him a very pleasant surprise, it's James to the rescue and some interesting possibilities arise for the bedridden Caro, Maxine is under pressure and neither Magda or Sean are around when she needs them. Where are they?

Episode 2.12 (Tuesday 6 September 1988) — written by Judy Callingham, directed by Peter Barrett
As the new Redfern heir arrives home Olivia is confronted with ghosts from the past, the launch of Alistair's new venture is spoilt by the messy demise of the old one, Maxine has a new story but there is more to this case of plastic surgery than meets the eye.

Episode 2.13 (Tuesday 13 September 1988) — written by Rosemary McLeod, directed by Aileen O'Sullivan
Maxine is in trouble, Olivia springs a surprise, and Rex is prepared to be generous. It's a big day for Caro and the baby, bigger than the family realises.

=== Season 3 (1989/90) ===
The third and final series (commonly known as Gloss III) was broadcast on Channel 2 (formerly Network Two) on Wednesdays at 7.30pm from August 1989 through January 1990, and consisted of 24 episodes.

Episode 3.01 (Wednesday 9 August 1989) — written by Judy Callingham, directed by Tony Holden
With Olivia's whereabouts unknown the family is leaderless as they await news from Miranda's kidnappers. There is also a confrontation between cousins and deliverance for Maxine from a multimillion-dollar lawsuit.

Episode 3.02 (Wednesday 16 August 1989) — written by Ian Mune, directed by Murray Reece
The Redferns go hunting. The search for Miranda leads to a very nasty surprise for Rex. Maxine sets out on the trail of a fortune - alone. Gemma is restless while Alistair is away stalking the kidnappers. Meanwhile, at "Gloss" Magda's after a new man and Poppy (Raewyn Blade) is acting strangely.

Episode 3.03 (Wednesday 23 August 1989) — written by Rosemary McLeod, directed by Peter Barrett
The Redferns are on the move. Rex and Maxine make their big play for Aaron's fortune, Chelsea gets help with her magazine and relationship problems loom large between Alistair and Gemma. Meanwhile, at "Gloss" there are big problems for Poppy.

Episode 3.04 (Wednesday 30 August 1989) — written by Debra Daley, directed by Aileen O'Sullivan
Big changes are afoot for the Redfern clan. Alistair has grand ambitions, Gemma sets her cap at the editor's job, Rex anticipates a windfall and Maxine goes house-hunting, Chelsea interviews heavy metal rocker Mike Havoc. Meanwhile, there is an embarrassing moment for Poppy.

Episode 3.05 (Wednesday 6 September 1989) — written by Liddy Holloway, directed by Tony Holden
With their empire only just born, Maxine and Rex decide two's company but three's a crowd. Giles (Mark Ferguson), however, has a rather different view. A new magazine is launched. For Chelsea there's a new man stepping from the shadows and for Gemma it's a day of winning and losing. Lucy Lawless appeared in a non-speaking part.

Episode 3.06 (Wednesday 13 September 1989) — written by Norelle Scott and James Griffin, directed by Murray Reece
Ups and Downs. Alistair and Gemma's marriage heads down the drain. Rex and Caro collide in a very revealing way. With Maxine onto bigger game, Magda assumes control at Gloss, or does she? And just what is Chris Dunbar-Jones' (Ross Girven) dark secret?

Episode 3.07 (Wednesday 20 September 1989) — written by Judy Callingham, directed by Peter Barrett
Backlash. Gemma pays the price and Alistair seeks sanctuary in the country, where a whole world of possibilities opens, Meanwhile, Rex feels the need to move quickly in his conquest of Caro. And a television appearance holds a hidden agenda for Maxine.

Episode 3.08 (Wednesday 27 September 1989) — written by Liddy Holloway, directed by Aileen O'Sullivan
Olivia raises a spectre from the past in an attempt to drive a wedge between Rex and Caro, but the results are far from expected. A bet among the boys leads to some ugly repercussions.

Episode 3.09 (Wednesday 4 October 1989) — written by James Griffin, directed by Tony Holden
Gemma is out for revenge, Alistair is out to find the truth, and Maxine is out to find a new career.

Episode 3.10 (Wednesday 11 October 1989) — written by Judy Callingham, directed by Murray Reece
Alistair's quest gets the vision mob a bit tetchy. Gemma has a rather sinister shopping list she needs filled while Chelsea is losing control of her magazine.

Episode 3.11 (Wednesday 18 October 1989) — written by Bruce Phillips, directed by Peter Barrett
Wedding bells ring for Rex and Caro but there are a couple of potential party poopers in Gemma and Olivia, Alistair learns the truth, and life is not all joy and happiness for Magda.

Episode 3.12 (Wednesday 25 October 1989) — written by Liddy Holloway, directed by Aileen O'Sullivan
As news of Rex's "accident" spreads, all sorts of muck is dredged to the surface. For Maxine it's a piece of publicity this would-be mayor can live without and for Alistair the noose begins to tighten.

Episode 3.13 (Wednesday 1 November 1989) — written by Liddy Holloway, directed by Aileen O'Sullivan
Alistair will stop at nothing to prove his innocence. Maxine, her mayoral campaign in tatters, is pursued by the gutter press but it is sister Cheryl (Jennifer Ludlam) they land. There is a fire and a "death" at a certain mental hospital. And a visit to the hairdresser's changes Magda's life.

Episode 3.14 (Wednesday 8 November 1989) — written by James Griffin, directed by Peter Sharp
Alistair puts the heat on Gemma, Aaron's funeral is poorly attended, Maxine decides it's time to face the press, there are big shocks in store for Magda, and Jasmine is in dire straits.

Episode 3.15 (Wednesday 15 November 1989) — written by Ian Mune, directed by Peter Barrett
Gemma is pushed and comes out fighting, a party at the mansion tests old relationships and builds on others, Magda has some good and bad news from Sean, and Aaron makes his first approaches.

Episode 3.16 (Wednesday 22 November 1989) — written by Judy Callingham, directed by Aileen O'Sullivan
Giles is in for a surprise when he organises a surprise party for Maxine and Rex, Magda thinks about getting away from it all, while Chris looks like he may lose it all, Cheryl tries to tame the wayward Damien (Kevin Smith) and Olivia makes a new resolution.

Episode 3.17 (Wednesday 29 November 1989) — written by ????, directed by Murray Reece
Maxine and Rex pay dearly to get Aaron out of their lives, as must Olivia in a very different way, and battle lines are drawn between Chelsea and Damien.

Episode 3.18 (Wednesday 6 December 1989) — written by Rosemary McLeod, directed by Peter Sharp
Maxine is pressured to give up an old love.

Episode 3.19 (Wednesday 13 December 1989) — written by Liddy Holloway, directed by Peter Barrett
Maxine's holiday is not the break she hoped for. Matt (Andy Anderson) turns sleuth and Jessica (Judy McIntosh) has more bad news for Alistair.

Episode 3.20 (Wednesday 20 December 1989) — written by Norelle Scott, directed by Aileen O'Sullivan
The court's judgement on Gemma is not quite the biggest news of the day. Rex and Caro's closeness spells disaster for Alistair and Chris takes an irrevocable step.

Episode 3.21 (Wednesday 27 December 1989) — written by Wendy Jackson, directed by Murray Reece
Alistair's fate depends on Caro's vote. Gemma's baby will be looked after - but by whom ? And Matt pursues Maxine.

Episode 3.22 (Wednesday 3 January 1990) — written by Rosemary McLeod, directed by Peter Sharp
Maxine realises how little she knows her fate. Alistair attempts a fresh start and Rex grabs his chance to betray the family.

Episode 3.23 (Wednesday 10 January 1990) — written by Liddy Holloway, directed by Peter Barrett
Rex's revenge on the Redferns is almost complete but Olivia sets out to make his triumph short-lived. Magda and Sean learn more startling information about Matt.

Episode 3.24 (Wednesday 17 January 1990) — written by James Griffin, directed by Aileen O'Sullivan
Gemma makes her farewells, Chris stays close to his seriously injured sister, Rex now wants back what he abandoned so freely, and what will Maxine do once she discovers the truth about Matt? This is the last ever episode of Gloss as TVNZ closed its in-house drama department and outsourced its drama productions to independent producers.
