= The Mad Dog Gang Meets Rotten Fred and Ratsguts =

1978 New Zealand children's TV show

The Mad Dog Gang Meets Rotten Fred and Ratsguts is a 1978 New Zealand children's television drama produced by Television One Dunedin. It was written by Ian Mune and Arthur Baysting and directed by Ross Jennings. It was filmed in Dunedin and the surrounding Otago country district.

== Cast ==
- Suey: Julie Wilson
- Tony: Ian Templeton
- Harvey: Buddy Ruruku
- Rotten Fred: Walt Brown
- Aunt Maureen: Eve Durning
- Uncle Eric: Brian Beresford
- Wilkie: John Bach
- Newman: Don Donner
- Sergeant Daniels: Barry Dorking

== Synopsis ==
9-year-old Tony and 7-year-old sister Suey are sent to live on their Uncle Eric and Aunt Maureen's farm while their mother recovers from a serious illness. Enrolled at the local school, they meet tough Māori boy Harvey Kepanui, who bullies them. Teacher Mr. Newman warns the class to stay away from Rotten Fred, a fearsome local vagrant who squats in an old shack on government-owned land. When they get home, Tony and Suey learn how to ride a horse - the other kids routinely ride horses to school. Suey has nightmares about Fred, who she has encountered before. Meanwhile, local farmers, including their neighbour Wilkie, are complaining about a recent spate of sheep killings, apparently by a dog.

Harvey dares Tony to accompany him to Fred's shack. They enter through a window, finding stuffed animals and unusual trinkets before they are interrupted by an angry Fred. Fred chases them but they escape. Harvey stole cigarettes and a carving of a dog inscribed "Mt. Eden Prison". Harvey takes Tony and Suey to an old barn, where they agree to form a secret club called the "Mad Dog Gang" with the avowed aim of "bringing the murderer Rotten Fred to justice", adopting the carving as their mascot.

For their first adventure, the Mad Dog Gang steal fruit from Wilkie's property. He sees them but they escape. Wilkie later arrives at Uncle Eric's farm to give Tony and Suey an earful, prompting Suey to tell him she believes it is Fred's dog Ratsguts that has been killing his sheep. Wilkie drives to Fred's shack and confronts him, but Fred denies that his dog attacks sheep and tells Wilkie to stay away.

The boys again enter Fred's shack, where they discover a newspaper clipping confirming that Fred was imprisoned for manslaughter. Suey follows from a distance but falls off her pony, who runs away. Suey gets lost chasing after him and discovers a cave from which a roar emanates. Terrified and convinced that a "monster" lives there, she flees through the bushes, and screams when she runs into Fred. Fred calms her and asks her to return the stolen carving she is wearing as a pendant. She does so, and makes friends with Fred and Ratsguts. The boys find them, and become friends with Fred.

A furious Wilkie visits Eric and again complains that his sheep have been attacked. He promises to put an end to it, gathering local farmers to shoot Ratsguts and run Fred out of the district. The kids rush to Fred's shack to warn him. Fred considers the situation, then hides Ratsguts indoors and orders the kids to leave. The kids run off with Ratsguts without Fred's knowledge. The farmers arrive and demand that Fred hand over Ratsguts, but he refuses, firing warning shots at them. Local police officer Sergeant Daniels arrives and orders all of them to put down their weapons. He tells Fred to bring the dog out, but Ratsguts is missing. The kids and Ratsguts head for the cave where the "monster" lives. They enter the cave and Ratsguts begins fighting with a wild dog. Daniels, Fred and the farmers arrive, and Daniels shoots the wild dog, leaving Ratsguts unharmed. The dead dog is identified as one that ran away from Wilkie's farm due to ill treatment. Later, the kids go to visit Fred, but he has left the district, leaving them a note inviting them to use his abandoned shack as a headquarters for their gang.

== Reception ==
The original 75 minute film received the 1979 Feltex award for best drama. In 1980 a sequel entitled The Mad Dog Gang Spooks Wilkie, Wink Wink and the Wobbler was broadcast. The show was popular with children and was sold to several countries, including Spain, where the two films were broadcast in 7 parts as "La banda del perro rabioso". Ian Mune also wrote a tie-in novel.
