= The Last Tattoo =

1994 New Zealand film

- Directed by: John Reid
- Written by: Keith Aberdein
- Produced by: Neville Carson; Bill Gavin
- Starring: Kerry Fox; Tony Goldwyn; Robert Loggia; John Bach; Rod Steiger
- Cinematography: John Blick
- Edited by: John Scott
- Music by: John Charles
- Production companies: Plumb Productions; Capella Films; New Zealand Film Commission
- Distributed by: Castle Hill Productions (USA)
- Release dates: 15 May 1994 (Cannes Film Festival (Market)); 3 February 1995 (New Zealand)
- Running time: 112 minutes
- Country: New Zealand
- Language: English

The Last Tattoo is a 1994 feature film set in World War II-era Wellington, New Zealand.

== Plot ==
While tracking down cases of venereal disease associated with a local prostitute, Kelly Towne, a public health nurse, meets United States Marine Corps Captain Michael Starwood, who investigates the murder of one of the servicemen who have been on leave from their nearby camp during World War II.

== Cast ==
- Tony Goldwyn as Capt. Michael Starwood
- Kerry Fox as Kelly Towne
- Robert Loggia as Cmdr. Conrad Dart
- John Bach as Austin Leech
- Rod Steiger as Gen. Frank Zane
- Katie Wolfe as Rose Mitchell
- Desmond Kelly as Monty McGurr
- Mark Raffety as Johnny O'Rourke
- Elizabeth Hawthorne as Henrietta Simpson
- Danielle Cormack as Molly
- Peter Hambleton as Peter Davis
- Tony Barry as James Patrick Carroll
- William Kircher as Gibbon
- Tim Balme as Jim Mitchell
- Martyn Sanderson as Ralph Simpson
- Theresa Healey as Cora Bell
- Don Selwyn as Bill Davin
- Jed Brophy as Furlough Guard
- Hilary Halba as Committee Woman
- Robyn Malcolm as Working Girl
- Ben Fransham as Dancing Sailor

== Reviews ==
- 1994: Cinema Papers New Zealand Supplement.
- 1994: Variety review.
- 1995: featured in New Zealand's contribution to the British Film Institute's Century of Cinema series - Cinema of Unease: A Personal Journey by Sam Neill.
