= The Shirt =

2000 New Zealand film

- Directed by: John Laing
- Written by: Ross Bevan
- Produced by: Ross Bevan
- Starring: Brian Sergent; Kirsty King-Turner; Irene Wood
- Cinematography: Deane Cronin; Dave Joyce; John Laing; Wayne Vinten
- Edited by: Owen Ferrier-Kerr
- Music by: Toby Laing
- Production company: Cult Classic Pictures
- Release date: 2000
- Running time: 85 minutes
- Country: New Zealand
- Language: English

The Shirt is a 2000 New Zealand film directed by John Laing.

== Synopsis ==
Two Wellington junkies Marty and Gina are living a dysfunctional family life. The police suspect that Marty knows about a murder in Mt Victoria.

== Cast ==
- Timothy Bartlett as Errol
- Ross Bevan as Jack Webber
- Stephen Gledhill as John Button
- Kirsty King-Turner as Gina
- Joanne Mildenhall as Aroha O'Neill
- Steve Morris as Chester
- Marshall Napier as Mike Hughes
- Brian Sergent as Marty
- P.J. Sisson as Bernie Brodie
- Jeff Szusterman as Nick
- Jeffrey Thomas as Carl Berry
- Irene Wood as Joyce

== Production ==
There was an earlier short 12 minute version made in 1998.

== Reviews ==
Censored in New Zealand as "R18; Restricted for persons 18 years and over". The shirt was screened at the Twenty-Ninth Wellington Film Festival in 2000. The earlier 1998 short version was screened at the festival in 1999.
