= One of Those People that Live in the World =

1973 New Zealand film

- Directed by: Paul Maunder
- Written by: Paul Maunder
- Produced by: David H Fowler
- Starring: Anne Manchester; John Reid; Denise Maunder
- Cinematography: Lynton Diggle
- Edited by: Paul Maunder; Anne Manchester
- Music by: Tony Backhouse
- Production company: National Film Unit
- Release date: 1973
- Running time: 70 minutes
- Country: New Zealand
- Language: English

One of Those People that Live in the World is a 1973 New Zealand film directed by Paul Maunder.

== Synopsis ==
This is about a woman's mental health crisis. In the first part Julie is haunted by her birth mother's breakdown. Julie hopes marriage and a job will overcome her problems, and falls pregnant. Following a traumatic delivery, Julie suffers an acute episode and is admitted into care. The second part is in a psychiatric hospital where drugs, electroconvulsive therapy and art therapy were used as standard treatments.

== Cast ==
- Lisa Aitken as Child
- Donna Akersten as Receptionist
- John Anderson as Lewis
- Gael Anderson as Mrs Proctor
- Anne Batt as Dorothy
- Jean Betts as Birth mother
- Pat Birdling as Barbara
- Helen Brew as Mother
- Kaye Buchanan as Occupational Therapist
- Marie Bullock as Mrs Priddle
- Sarah Burdett as Child
- Georgina Carey as Mrs McPherson
- Lisa Cunningham as Library Assistant
- Jonathan Dennis as Patient
- Russell Duncan as Father
- Frank Edwards as Lecturer
- Anne England as Drama Teacher
- Janice Finn as Nurse Lipskey
- Jan Fraser as Social Worker
- Thelma Gradmair as Mrs Manaia
- Michael Haigh as Dr Marshall (psychiatrist)
- Margaret Hawkins as Mrs Flowers
- Nancy Krinkle as Mrs Jenkin
- Jim Macfarlane as Doctor
- Anne Manchester as Nurse
- Denise Maunder as Julie
- Wendy McFarlane as Mrs Walker
- Jane McKechnie as Pat
- Vivienne Morgan as Nurse
- Jean Packman as Nurse
- John Reid as Husband
- Anne Roberts as Sister
- Lewis Rowe as Librarian
- Olwen Taylor as Janice
- Jenny Vaademeyer as Dr Rennie
- Davinia White as Cecily
- Valmarie Yates as Liz
