= John Laing (director) =

New Zealand film and television director and producer

- Born: Dunedin, New Zealand
- Occupations: Film director; television director; producer; writer
- Years active: 1978–present

John Laing is a New Zealand film and television director and producer.

== Early life ==
Laing was born in Dunedin.

== Career ==
Laiang made his major directorial debut with the film Beyond Reasonable Doubt (1980). He directed a number of other films including Abandoned (2015) before starting a career in television, directing episodes of the Canadian series The Hitchhiker. His other television credits include The Ray Bradbury Theater, Mysterious Island, Hercules: The Legendary Journeys, Xena: Warrior Princess, Jack of All Trades, Cleopatra 2525, Power Rangers S.P.D., Power Rangers Mystic Force, Orange Roughies, Nothing Trivial, Power Rangers Megaforce, Duggan and the television film Wendy Wu: Homecoming Warrior (2006) starring Brenda Song.

His 1992 film Absent Without Leave was entered into the 18th Moscow International Film Festival.

== Filmography ==
=== Film ===
Title	Year	Credited as			Notes
Title	Year	Director	Producer	Writer	Notes
The Rubber Gun	1977	No	No	Yes	Also editor
Beyond Reasonable Doubt	1980	Yes	No	No	
Race for the Yankee Zephyr	1981	No	No	No	Editor
The Lost Tribe	1983	Yes	Yes	Yes	
Other Halves	1984	Yes	No	No	
Dangerous Orphans	1986	Yes	No	No	
Absent Without Leave	1992	Yes	No	No	
The Shirt	2000	Yes	No	No	Cinematographer
No One Can Hear You	2001	Yes	No	Yes	IMDb
A War Story	2018	Yes	No	No	YouTube

=== Television ===
The numbers in directing credits refer to the number of episodes.

Title	Year	Credited as	Network	Notes
Title	Year	Director	Network	Notes
Inside Straight	1984	Yes (2)	Television One	
Roche	1985	Yes (2)	Television One	
The Hitchhiker	1987–89	Yes (4)	HBO; USA Network	
The Ray Bradbury Theater	1990–92	Yes (5)	USA Network	
Marlin Bay	1994	Yes (1)	TV One	
Cody: Bad Love	1994	Yes	Seven Network	Television film
Cover Story	1995–96	Yes (5)	TV3	
Plainclothes	1995	Yes (2)	TV One	
Singapore Sling: Road to Mandalay	1995	Yes	Nine Network	Television film
Mysterious Island	1995	Yes (3)	Family Channel	
Hercules: The Legendary Journeys	1998–99	Yes (4)	Syndication	
Xena: Warrior Princess	1998–2001	Yes (3)	Syndication	
The Adventures of Swiss Family Robinson	1998	Yes (15)	Pax TV	
Tiger Country	1998	Yes	TV3	Television film
Greenstone	1999	Yes (2)	TV One	
Duggan	1999	Yes (2)	TV One	
Jackson's Wharf	1999	Yes (8)	TV2	
Jack of All Trades	2000	Yes (2)	Syndication	
Street Legal	2000–01	Yes (5)	TV2	
Cleopatra 2525	2000	Yes (2)	Syndication	
Power Rangers S.P.D.	2005	Yes (8)	Toon Disney	
Power Rangers Mystic Force	2006	Yes (3)	Toon Disney	
Orange Roughies	2006	Yes (4)	TV One	
Wendy Wu: Homecoming Warrior	2006	Yes	Disney Channel	Television film
Go Girls	2011–13	Yes (12)	TV2	
Nothing Trivial	2011–13	Yes (6)	TV One	
Safe House	2012	Yes	TV One	Television film
The Blue Rose	2013	Yes (2)	TV3	
Power Rangers Megaforce	2013	Yes (5)	Nickelodeon	
Step Dave	2014	Yes (2)	TV2	
Venus and Mars	2015	Yes	TV One	Television film Also producer
Abandoned	2015	Yes	TV One	Television film
Dear Murderer	2017	Yes (2)	TVNZ 1	

==== Producer only ====
Title	Year	Network	Notes
Mercy Peak	2001–04	TV One	
Outrageous Fortune	2006–10	TV3	Series 2–6
Westside	2015	Three	Series 1
