= Derek Hardwick (actor) =

New Zealand actor

- Occupation: Actor
- Notable work: The Pumice Land; Among the Cinders; High Country

Derek Hardwick (1917–1988) is a New Zealand actor. He played the role of Austin Morris in the 1982 teleplay The Pumice Land for which he was nominated for Best Actor at the 1982 Feltex Television Awards. He starred the 1983 film Among the Cinders, winning an honorary diploma at the Karlovy Vary Film Festival. He featured in High Country and A Woman of Good Character He played the father TK Donovan in Carry Me Back, spending much of the film playing a corpse.

On TV he was a regular on Roche appearing as the father Barney Roche. and played Sam in Gloss
