= Landfall (1975 film) =

1975 New Zealand film

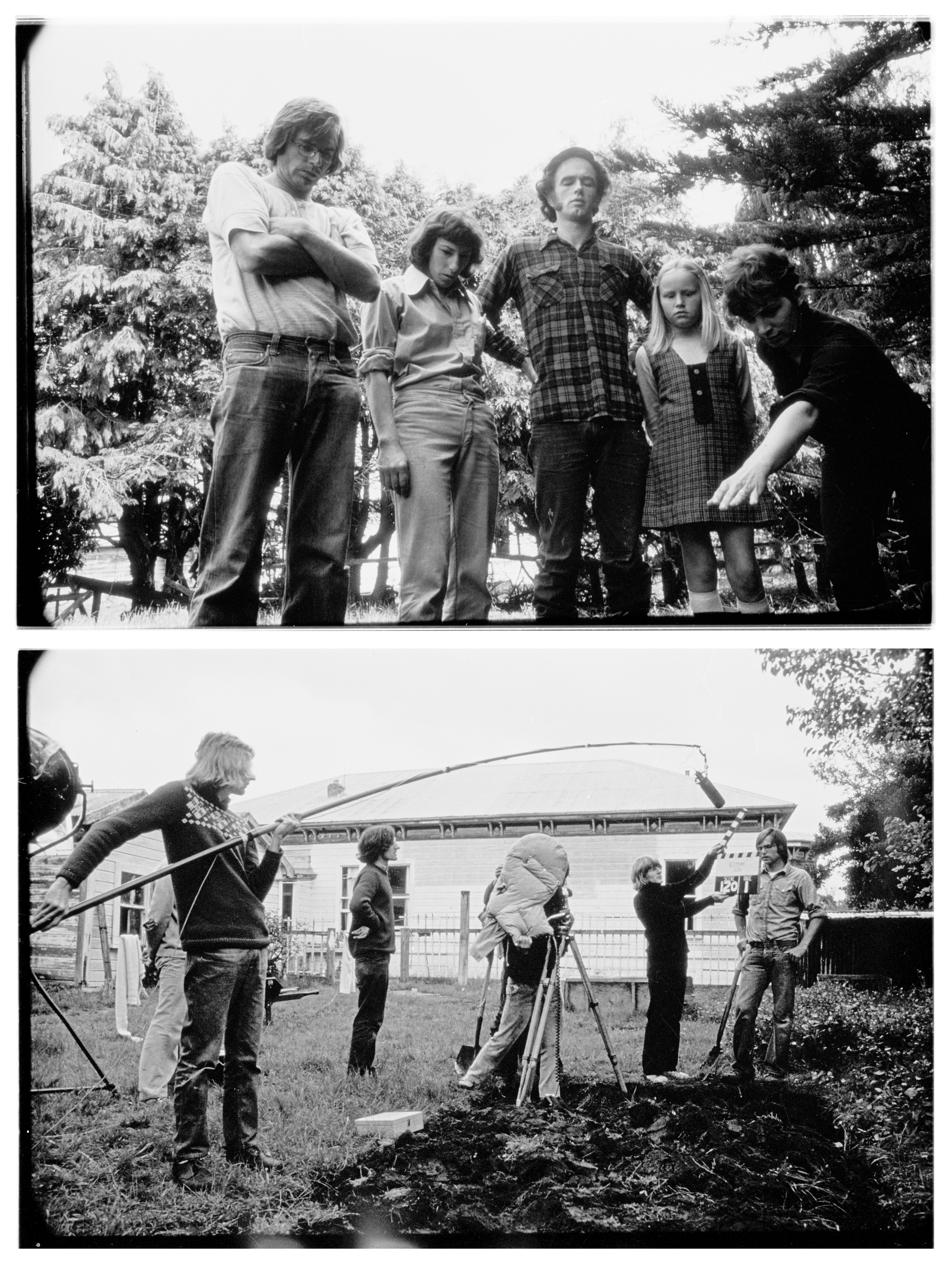
- Directed by: Paul Maunder
- Written by: Paul Maunder
- Starring: Denise Maunder; John Anderson; Sam Neill
- Cinematography: Lynton Diggle
- Production company: National Film Unit
- Release dates: 1975 (Pacific and Asian Young Filmmakers Festival)
- Running time: 77 minutes
- Country: New Zealand
- Language: English

Landfall is a 1975 New Zealand film directed by Paul Maunder. It was shown at the 1977 Wellington Film Festival.

The film was made for television, but not broadcast because of its content, and was then formatted for cinema release. It was Sam Neill's film debut.

== Synopsis ==
Members of a rural commune are discovered using illegal drugs by a local policeman. They kill the policeman and bury him in their garden. The commune then starts to disintegrate.

== Cast ==
- Denise Maunder as Sandra
- John Anderson as John
- Sam Neill as Eric
- Gael Anderson as Elizabeth
- Rowena Zinsli as Girl
- Russell Duncan as Tramp
- Michael Haigh as Policeman
- Pat Evison as Visitor
- Jonathan Dennis as Reporter
- Owen Taylor as Addict

== Reviews ==
- 1976 The Press - first prize in the Asian Broadcasting Union festival.
