= Wild Horses (1983 film) =

- Directed by: Derek Morton
- Written by: Kevin O'Sullivan
- Produced by: John Barnett
- Starring: Keith Aberdein; Bruno Lawrence
- Cinematography: Douglas Milsome
- Edited by: Simon Reece
- Music by: Dave Fraser
- Release date: February 1983
- Running time: 90 min
- Country: New Zealand
- Language: English
- Budget: $2 million

Wild Horses is a 1983 New Zealand film, filmed at Tongariro National Park. It was directed by Derek Morton but he was not happy with the final cut so disclaimed credit. It debuted at the Manila International Film Festival in February 1983.

== Synopsis ==
Three friends working on breaking in wild horses clash with deer hunters.

== Cast ==
- Keith Aberdein as Mitch
- John Bach as Jack
- Kevin J. Wilson as Harry
- Robyn Gibbes as Sara
- Bruno Lawrence as Tyson
- Marshall Napier as Andy
- Martyn Sanderson as Jones
- Michael Haigh as Benson
- Tom Poata as Sam
- Kathy Rawlings as Mary
- Matiu Mareikura as Kingi

== Reception ==
Helen Martin in New Zealand film, 1912-1996 says "Shot in B-grade western style Wild Horses makes excellent use of locations - sweeping tusock-covered plains, crystalline rivers, glorious snow-capped mountains and a portentous horizon - but the genre cliches look comical and the stern messages are much too heavy for the disjointed narrative, which is full of holes, non sequiturs and unexplained incidents and relationships." In the New York Times Vincent Canby said "We've had American westerns, Italian westerns, Spanish westerns, Yugoslav westerns, Australian westerns and now Wild Horses, a New Zealand western that opens today at the Eastside Cinema. Don't add it to your must-see list." He writes "Wild Horses is full of familiar mannerisms - long shots of riders silhouetted against the sky, speeches that make reference to rugged individualism, a hero who is identified with a white horse and a villain who rides a black one. Nothing works, though. Mr. Morton's attempts to impose a shape on his material are like those of a small, earnest child trying to fit together two non-contiguous pieces of a jigsaw puzzle." Tom Sullivan in the Herald-News writes "It is what used to be known in the '30s and '40s as a programmer or pot boiler - lower half of a double bill - and reflects no excellence in its content or its technical standards." Daily News critic Harry Haun gave it 1 1/2 stars and finishes "Despite claims to the contrary, Wild Horses is pretty tame stuff." Tarrytown Daily News's William Wolf says "The screenplay by Kevin O'Sullivan has a good idea at its core. But it rambles, throwing in far too much in the way of problems and relationships. The focus isn't sharp enough and the film, for all its sensitivity to an issue, hasn't any driving energy."
