= Old Scores =

1991 television film

- Written by: Greg McGee; Dean Parker
- Directed by: Alan Clayton
- Music by: Wayne Warlowe
- Country of origin: New Zealand
- Original language: English

Production
- Producer: Don Reynolds
- Cinematography: Allen Guilford
- Editors: Michael Horton; Jamie Selkirk
- Running time: 93 minutes
- Production companies: HTV Cymru Wales; South Pacific Pictures

Original release
- Network: ITV
- Release: 25 September 1991

Old Scores is a 1991 television film jointly produced by New Zealand and Wales, about the two countries' mutual national sport of rugby union. It is notable for the appearance of many notable Welsh and New Zealand international rugby players in supporting roles. Old Scores was primarily intended as theatrical release in New Zealand but was shown as a television film in Wales.

Old Scores was directed by Alan Clayton, and the screenplay was by New Zealanders Dean Parker and Greg McGee.

== Plot ==
Old Scores revolves around a controversial fictional rugby match in 1966 between Wales and New Zealand which was won by Wales. On his death-bed, the touch judge confesses to failing to disallow the winning try for an infringement by the Welsh scorer. The Welsh Rugby Union president announces that in order to set the record straight, there should be a rematch between the two teams; using the same players who had played the match 25 years earlier.

The teams are forced to re-assemble, each bringing along not only their 25 years of unfitness, but also various skeletons in the closet — most notably the major falling-out between two of Wales's star players, Bleddyn Morgan and David Llewellyn, whose friendship had ended acrimoniously many years earlier. Morgan had since moved to New Zealand, and initially refuses to play the match. It is later revealed that this is because of a love triangle which had developed between the two and Llewellyn's fiancée Bronwen. He is persuaded to play, for the sake of his country, but there is considerable acrimony between the two players which threatens to disrupt the team's performance.

The film is a blend of drama and comedy, the latter especially revolving around the efforts of the players to come to grips with both their middle-aged bodies and the changes in rugby since their time as international players: rugby was an amateur sport in 1966, although by 1991 it had become big business. The New Zealand team are a rag-tag bunch whose later lives have taken them in different directions: the team's "hard man" has become a peace-loving Salvation Army officer, one of the team has become a vote-grabbing politician, yet another has become a homeless drunk. All are reassembled and put through their paces by their 1970s coach, "Acid" (a biting caricature by Martyn Sanderson of fabled All Blacks coach Fred Allen). The film culminates in the replayed game, played at Cardiff Arms Park.

According to the Helen Martin and Sam Edwards' book New Zealand Film 1912 - 1996: "The dialogue is witty and characterisations are fine, if deliberately overplayed, but the ending turns the film into a shaggy-dog story." The match ball is replaced by Wales's lucky ball ("Old Lucky"), an antique taken from the Welsh Rugby Museum by Price. With the scores tied, a shot is taken at goal, but the ancient leather of the ball is not strong enough and it deflates, landing limply on the crossbar where it remains. The final scene of the film shows an official review into the match deciding that it should be replayed again.

== Cast ==
Cast	Role
John Bach	Ewen Murray
Tony Barry	Barry Brown
Roy Billing	Frank O'Riordan
Alison Bruce	Ngaire Morgan
Robert Bruce	Jock McBane
Terence Cooper	Eric Hogg
Windsor Davies	Evan Price
Dafydd Emyr	Owen Llewellyn
Howell Evans	Lloyd Thomas
John Francis	David Llewellyn
Peter Gwynne	Winston Macatamney
Glyn Houston	Aneurin Morgan
John Moreno	Referee
Beth Morris	Bronwyn Llewellyn
Robert Pugh	Bleddyn Morgan
Martyn Sanderson	"Acid" Aitken
Stephen Tozer	Jim Farquhar
Jack Walters	Clifford
Neil Ross	Arms Park Crowd Extra
Adrian Judd	Arms Park Crowd Extra

The cast mixes a number of experienced New Zealand actors (such as John Bach and Martyn Sanderson — the former, ironically, being Welsh-born), with many rugby players from the 1960s and 70s taking supporting roles as members of the Welsh and New Zealand teams – the latter mostly in non-speaking parts. The players included New Zealand's Ian Kirkpatrick, Waka Nathan, Grahame Thorne and Alex Wyllie, and Wales's Phil Bennett, Gerald Davies, Mervyn Davies, Gareth Edwards, Tony Faulkner, Dennis Hughes, Barry John, Allan Martin, Dai Morris, David Price, Mike Roberts, J. J. Williams and Bobby Windsor. Despite the film's plot indicating that these were the teams from 1966, many of these players did not play international rugby until after this time.

1990s All Black Steve McDowall also appears (and acted as choreographer for the rugby match scenes), as does New Zealand rugby commentator Keith Quinn.

== Advertisement ==
Two of the cast of the film, Grizz Wyllie and Windsor Davies, appeared together in an advertisement for hardware chain Mitre 10 as a result of appearing in Old Scores.

== Awards ==
New Zealand Film Awards 1992

- Best Performance in a supporting role - John Bach and Roy Billing - won
- Best Screenplay - Dean Parker and Greg McGee - won

== Sources ==
- Martin, H., & Edwards, S. (1997) New Zealand film, 1912–1996. Auckland: Oxford University Press (NZ).
