= Martyn Sanderson =

New Zealand actor (1938-2009)

Martyn Sanderson ONZM
- Born: 24 February 1938; Westport, West Coast, New Zealand
- Died: 14 October 2009 (aged 71); Ōtaki, Wellington, New Zealand
- Education: Oxford University
- Occupations: Actor; director; producer; writer; poet
- Awards: Feltex Award

Martyn Sanderson ONZM (24 February 1938 – 14 October 2009) was a New Zealand actor, director, producer, writer and poet.

Sanderson was described as one of the founding fathers of modern theatre in New Zealand. In New Zealand he had appearances in 26 films, but also worked internationally including in Australia and Samoa.

== Early life ==
Sanderson was born the son of a missionary father and a mother who was a writer, he studied literature at Oxford University, and after a brief study of theology, he abandoned his initial plans of joining the priesthood and married a ceramic artist, Liz Earth.

== Career ==
After returning to his native NZ, Sanderson was one of the founders of Downstage Theatre (now the Hannah Playhouse) in 1964 in Wellington, with a vision of a small professional company performing challenging works in an intimate venue. It is now one of the longest serving theatre companies in New Zealand.

He emigrated to Australia in 1966, where he started producing his own documentaries and acting in film roles including the British-Australia production of Ned Kelly. In 1972, his family relocated to Hawkes Bay, where Sanderson toured with the multi-media group Blerta, and worked on films with Blerta members Bruno Lawrence and director Geoff Murphy. That decade he won a New Zealand Feltex Award for playing aviator Richard Pearse in a television film of the same title, and was nominated again for playing a British general in the historical miniseries The Governor, the most expensive TV drama made in New Zealand in that decade.

Sanderson's work as a screen director included a number of shorts featuring New Zealand poets, plus the 1989 feature Flying Fox in a Freedom Tree. Based on a work by Albert Wendt, Flying Fox is about a young Samoan caught between the values of his homeland and European colonisers.

He wrote a documentary One of those Blighters on Ronald Hugh Morrieson and the screenplay for the 1986 film of Morrieson's last novel, Pallet on the Floor.

Sanderson's other screen credits include Geoff Murphy's Utu, Jane Campion's An Angel at my Table, The Scarecrow, Old Scores, The Harp in the South, The Lord of the Rings film trilogy, a recurring guest role in the first two years of Shortland Street, Poor Man's Orange, the Hercules episode "The King of Thieves" and The Rainbow Warrior.

At the time of his death he was working on a play called Muntu with his second wife, Wanjiku Kiare Sanderson and directed by Kenyen artist and playwright Wakanyote Njuguna, through the African Connection Aotearoa, that they also founded.

== Death ==
Sanderson died of emphysema on 14 October 2009 aged 71.

== Honours ==
Sanderson was made an Officer of the New Zealand Order of Merit in 2005, "for services to literature and the theatre".

== Selected filmography ==
=== Film ===
Year	Title	Role	Type
1970	Ned Kelly	Fitzpatrick	Feature film
1975	Richard Pearse	Richard Pearse	TV movie
1977	Autumn Fires		
1977	Wild Man	Snake	Feature film
1977	Solo	Jules Catweazle	Feature film
1979	Jack Winter's Dream	Ballarat Jake	
1979	The Journalist	Bert	Feature film
1980	A Woman of Good Character	Reverend	
1980	Squeeze	Father	Feature film
1981	Bad Blood	Les North	Feature film
1982	Beyond Reasonable Doubt	Len Demler	Feature film docudrama
1982	The Scarecrow (aka Klynham Summer)	Ned as Adult (voice)	Feature film
1983	Patu!	Co-ordinator	Documentary film
1983	Wild Horses	Jones	TV movie
1984	Trial Run	Alan West	Feature film
1984	Utu	Vicar	Feature film
1985	The Lost Tribe	Bill Thorne	Feature film
1985	Sylvia	Inspector Gulland	Feature film
1986	Queen City Rocker	Drunk Husband	Feature film
1988	The Tale of Ruby Rose	Bennett	Feature film
1988	Never Say Die	Farmer	Feature film
1988	Mauri	Hospital Doctor (uncredited)	Feature film
1990	An Angel at My Table	Frank Sargeson	Feature film
1991	Old Scores	'Acid' Aitken	TV movie
1993	Desperate Remedies	Maori Warrior / Townspeople	Feature film
1993	The Rainbow Warrior	Uncle Emile	TV movie
1994	The Last Tattoo	Ralph Simpson	Feature film
1995	Savage Play	Henry	Feature film
1996	Juloratoriet	Stephen Eliot	
1996	Chicken	Bryce Tilfer	
2001	The Lord of the Rings: The Fellowship of the Ring	Gate Keeper	Feature film
2001	Blerta Revisited		Documentary film

=== Television ===
Year	Title	Role	Type
1973	Richard John Seddon - Premier	Reeves	TV film
1977	The Governor	British General	TV docudrama miniseries
1978	Rachel	Tom	TV miniseries
1979	Children of Fire Mountain		TV miniseries
1982	Kingi's Story	teacher	TV film
1986	The Harp in the South	Hughie Darcy	TV miniseries
1992–93	Shortland Street		TV series, recurring guest role
1987	Poor Man's Orange	Hughie Darcy	TV miniseries
1995	Hercules		TV series, episode: "The King of Thieves"
2001–02	Atlantis High	Grandpa Gordon	TV series
