= Brian Edwards (broadcaster) =

Irish-born New Zealand media personality and author

Brian Finbar Myram Edwards CNZM (born 4 November 1937 in Cork, Ireland) is a New Zealand media personality and author.

== Early life ==
Edwards was born in Cork and educated at the Royal Belfast Academical Institution. He arrived in New Zealand in 1964, where he intended to lecture in German at the University of Canterbury. After three years he quit this role and embarked on a career in the media.

== Radio and television career ==
Edwards is best known as a radio and television interviewer, and was the host of Radio New Zealand's highly rated show Top of the Morning from 1994 to 1999, a role which he returned to in 2006. He is also known for his television appearances, starting in the 1960s. Edwards has been a host of numerous television series, notably Fair Go (which he devised, and hosted for eight years), and in 2003 hosted his own talk show, Edwards at Large.

In the 1972 election, he stood unsuccessfully for Labour in the National-held seat of Miramar. His campaign was derailed when the New Zealand Truth revealed that he was living in a de facto relationship while still married to his first wife; this was considered scandalous at the time.

He currently runs a media training and communications consultancy in partnership with his wife Judy Callingham.

== Books ==
Edwards is also author of numerous books, including a biography of Prime Minister of New Zealand Helen Clark, an autobiography: Daddy Was A German Spy, And Other Scandals, published in 2008, and is also a prolific newspaper and magazine columnist. He holds an honours B.A. from the Queen's University of Belfast and a PhD from the University of Edinburgh.

== Honours and awards ==
Edwards has twice won the Media Peace Prize for his work on radio and in print. In the 1999 New Year Honours, he was appointed a Companion of the New Zealand Order of Merit, for services to broadcasting and journalism.

== Controversy ==
On 23 September 2009, Edwards claimed that "Public Libraries are just a Form of Theft" , arguing for "user pays" library books as a compensation to authors. The response from library supporters and creative public was overwhelmingly negative. Edwards later removed the post and comments with no explanation.

"Every public library in New Zealand bought at least one copy of Helen. And they lent each of those copies to other people to read for... nothing. Last year there were still 227.4 copies of the book in New Zealand public libraries. If each of those copies was taken out by one person a month, that’s 2,729 people who read but didn’t pay for my book - my six-month’s [sic] work. At $4.50 per unsold copy, that’s a theoretical loss of income to me in one year of $12,280."
"But there’s a principle here: when one person buys a book and lends it to another person to read, they effectively become an accessory to theft. Their generous act amounts to little more than stealing the author’s work. When a public library buys a book and lends it to thousands of other people to read, it’s grand theft copyright and really no different from illegally downloading music or movies or copying CDs or DVDs on your computer."

New Zealand has a public lending right scheme, administered by the National Library, under which authors are compensated for their books being in libraries.

== Memoir ==
Daddy was a German Spy, and Other Scandals (Penguin Books, 2008)

== See also ==
- List of New Zealand television personalities
