= Michael Haigh =

New Zealand actor, narrator and teacher

- Haigh in 1984
- Born: 1935
- Died: 31 October 1993 (aged 57–58)
- Occupations: Actor, teacher
- Years active: 1950s–1993

Michael Haigh (1935 – 31 October 1993) was a New Zealand actor, narrator and teacher.

== Early life ==
Haigh grew up in Wellington, New Zealand. His parents separated when he was 10 years old. Haigh was estranged from his father, an actor, and his mother, Dorothy, a radio broadcaster, raised him.

== Career ==
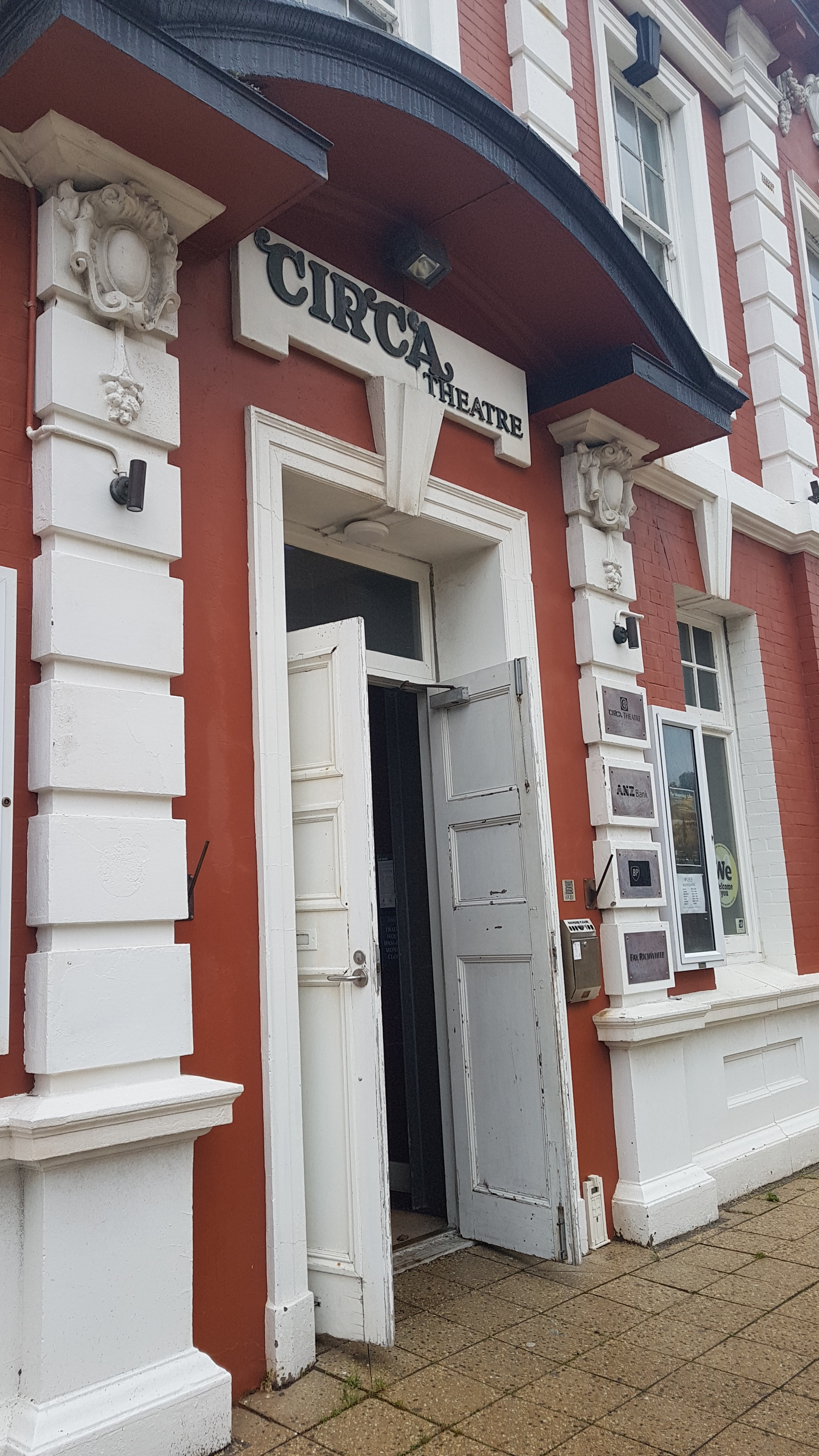
Circa Theatre entrance, Wellington

Haigh grew interested in theatre while attending Rongotai College. After leaving school he considered going into either journalism or teaching, but he settled on teaching and attended Wellington Teachers’ Training College in the 1950s. During this time, Haigh was active with The Thespians and Unity Theatre in Wellington.

Haigh was a teacher for 15 years. For the last seven of those years, Haigh, his wife, and two children were based in the far north of New Zealand, where he was teaching. In the 1960s he moved back to Wellington, as he had decided to become an actor as he no longer wanted to work in teaching.

His first television role was playing an officer in Gone up North for a While in 1972. In 1976 he was one of the founding members of Circa Theatre in Wellington, along with Ray Henwood, Grant Tilly, Susan Wilson, Jean Betts and others. The idea was conjured at a dinner party at Haigh's house in Miramar. It was the second professional theatre in Wellington, after Downstage.

The first play he directed was Roger Hall's Middle Age Spread at Circa Theatre in 1977.

Haigh went on to act in more television drama with Landfall: A Film About Ourselves, Moynihan and Close to Home.

His final role was in the 1992 New Zealand film Absent Without Leave.

== Death ==
Haigh died in Wellington on 31 October 1993. A tribute to Haigh was held at Old St Paul's in Wellington which ended with a standing ovation.

== Filmography ==
- Gone Up North for a While (1972)
- Richard John Seddon - Premier (1973)
- One of Those People that Live in the World (1973)
- Country Calendar - Fred Dagg (1974)
- Landfall - A Film about Ourselves (1975)
- Close to Home (1975-1983)
- Men and Super Men (1975)
- Moynihan (1976-1977)
- The Les Deverett Variety Hour (1978)
- The Deep End - The Captain’s Play (1980)
- Keeling Over (1980) - As Narrator
- Gliding On (1981-1985)
- Loose End - The Pumice Land (1981)
- Carry Me Back (1982)
- Bad Blood (1982)
- Among the Cinders (1983)
- Rabbiter’s Rest - A Fair Cop (1983)
- Wild Horses (1983)
- Country GP (1984-1985)
- Mr Wrong (1985)
- Footrot Flats - The Dog’s Tale (1986)
- Dangerous Orphans (1986)
- Send a Gorilla (1988)
- Absent Without Leave (1992)
