= Flying Fox in a Freedom Tree =

1989 New Zealand film

- Directed by: Martyn Sanderson
- Written by: Martyn Sanderson
- Based on: 1974 short story and other work by Albert Wendt
- Produced by: Graham McLean
- Starring: Faifua Amiga; Richard von Sturmer
- Narrated by: Peseta Sinave Isara
- Cinematography: Allen Guilford
- Edited by: Ken Zemke
- Music by: Michelle Scullion
- Production companies: New Zealand Film Commission; Grahame McLean Associates
- Release date: 1989
- Running time: 92 minutes
- Country: New Zealand
- Language: English

Flying Fox in a Freedom Tree is a 1989 New Zealand film directed by Martyn Sanderson. The film is based on the 1974 short story and other work by Albert Wendt.

== Synopsis ==
On the Samoan island of Sapepe, young Pepe is torn between tradition and modernity.

== Cast ==
- Faifua Amiga as Pepe
- Richard von Sturmer as Tagata
- Eteuati Ete as Tauilopepe
- Fuialo Molimau as Toasa

== Reviews ==
=== Awards ===
- 1989 Amiens International Film Festival (France) "Grand Prix de la Ville d'Amiens: for the film making the greatest contribution to the understanding of a culture and the identity of a people".
- 1989 Tokyo International Film Festival "Best Screenplay, Nominated for Tokyo Grand Prix".

=== Festivals ===
- 1990 Hawai'i
- 1990 American Film Institute Film Festival
- 1991 Umeå (Sweden)
- 1990 Warsaw Film Week (Poland)
- 1990 New Zealand International Film Festival
