= Desmond Kelly (New Zealand actor) =

New Zealand actor (1928–2024)

- Born: Desmond Lance Kelly; 24 July 1928
- Died: 4 February 2024 (aged 95)
- Occupation: Actor
- Years active: 1973–2018

Desmond Lance Kelly (sometimes credited as Des Kelly) (24 July 1928 – 4 February 2024) was a New Zealand actor, writer, and photographer.

Before turning to photography and acting, Kelly Desmond worked as a geologist and teacher.

Kelly debuted as an actor in Sons for the Return Home. He also appeared on TV shows such as The Flying Doctors for Crawford Productions as well as the UK/New Zealand TV series Dark Knight and the comedy series Jocko.

In 2015, he published his first crime fiction novel Death of a Friend.
