= Roche (TV series) =

1985 New Zealand television series

- Created by: Dean Parker
- Written by: Dean Parker; Greg McGee; Simon O’Connor; Matthew Simes
- Directed by: Derek Morton; John Anderson; Murray Reece; John Laing; Tony Isaac
- Composer: David Fraser
- Country of origin: New Zealand
- Original language: English
- No. of seasons: 1
- No. of episodes: 9

Production
- Producer: Peter Muxlow
- Editor: Clive Bayliss
- Running time: 50 minutes

Original release
- Release: May 22 – July 17, 1985

Roche is a New Zealand television series that aired on One in 1985. It is set around the Roche family and the Roche Brothers trucking company. Filming for the first series bagan in September 1984.A second series was planned but was dropped due to poor ratings.

== Cast ==
- John Bach as Mick
- Andy Anderson as Tony
- Lydia Davis as Molly
- Derek Hardwick as Barney
- Denise O'Connell as Kate
- Danny Mulheron as Billy
- Elenoa Lilo as Fa'alele
- Deirdre O'Connor as Sonia
- Jason Saunders as Dale
- Justin Curry as George
- Leon Banas as Bernard
- Deanah Mayhew as Rachel

== Reception ==
The controller of public affairs from the Ministry of Transport criticised the show, commenting on their "lax attitude to driving habits and road safety".

Ken Strongman in The Press wrote after the first episode "My guess is that “Roche” will divide the nation." saying "It was convincing, amusing, satisfying and is almost certain to make those who see it take sides. It is too accurate, in part, not to." Ian Hutchison, also in The Press, wrote "“Roche” is committed to the maintenance and reinforcement of basic social morals. It defines and highlights them against their opposites. Certainly, it depicts a world of anti-social morality, but in so doing it shows that alignment with such a world is totally fruitless."
