= Paul Maunder =

New Zealand filmmaker

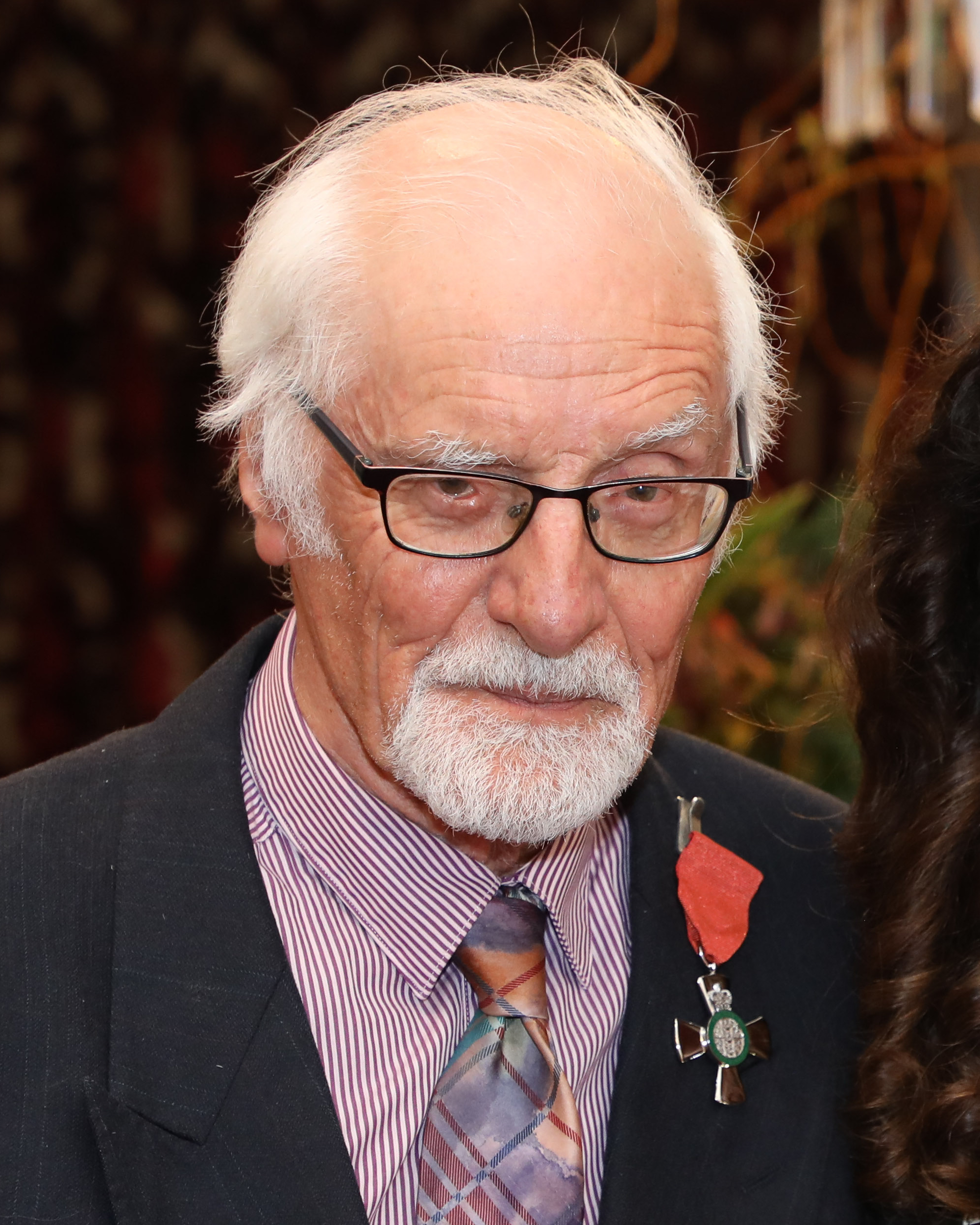
Maunder in 2023

Paul Allan Maunder MNZM (born 8 February 1945) is a New Zealand film director, playwright and cultural activist. He is best known for his 1979 film of the novel Sons for the Return Home by Albert Wendt, his 1983 play Hemi about the life of James K. Baxter, and his work in community-based theatre.

== Biography ==
Maunder was born in Palmerston North and attended Palmerston North Boys' High School. He played one first-class cricket match for Central Districts in the 1961–62 season. He studied at Victoria University of Wellington, the National Institute of Dramatic Art in Sydney and the London Film School.

Returning to New Zealand, Maunder worked for the state-owned National Film Unit. In addition to directing a number of the documentaries the unit was best known for, he directed three drama productions which were screened on television: Gone up North for a While, One Of Those People That Live In The World and Landfall (the film debut of Sam Neill).

In 1971, Maunder formed the Amamus theatre troupe in Wellington, staging improvised documentary plays on historical subjects such as the Great Depression and the 1951 waterfront lock-out. The group was then influenced by the work of Jerzy Grotowski and devised a trio of plays: Gallipoli, Valita and Oedipus, which examined the Kiwi psyche. In 1975 they were invited to the Festival of the Open Theatre in Wrocław, Poland. In the 1980s, under the new name of Theatre of the Eighth Day, the group performed a series of political plays, followed by a study on the poet James K Baxter, before embarking on a bicultural series of works, examining the clash of the Maori culture with the settler arrivals.

In 1987, Maunder was awarded a Commonwealth Study Grant to make contact with the Popular Theatre Movement in Zimbabwe. Returning to New Zealand he worked in the community-based theatre framework, setting up the Cultural Work Centre in Petone. A number of partnerships followed, for example, with the Tokelau community and with the Auckland Unemployed Workers Rights Centre.

Since 2001, Maunder has lived in the small town of Blackball on the West Coast where he works with a community-based theatre group, Kiwi/Possum Productions. The group has mounted a series of plays written by Maunder on local issues: 1080 poison (Poison and Purity), the Pike River Mine disaster (Goodnight, Irene), race relations (The Cave Above the Pa), mine closures (The Judgement of Ben Alder), heritage (Ted, Poppy and World War Two), mental health (A Brief History of Madness), and the transition economy (The Measures Taken). These plays tour the Coast and usually further afield. Maunder is also curator of Mahi Tupuna, the Blackball Museum of Working Class History. Maunder completed a master's thesis at the University of Canterbury in 2007, with a thesis on Rachel Corrie, and received a doctorate in Theatre and Film Studies in 2010 from the same institution. His PhD thesis was titled The Rebellious Mirror, Community-based Theatre in Aotearoa.

Maunder's recent publications include: Tornado and Other Stories Written Overtime (2009, Maitai River Press); Coal and the Coast: Reflections on the Pike River Disaster (2012, Canterbury University Press; Rebellious Mirrors: Community-based Theatre in Aotearoa/New Zealand (2013, Canterbury University Press); The Visit to Grandad (for children), (2018, Te Puawai Co-operative Society); West Coast Plays with an introduction by Carol Dawber), (2019. Te Puawai Co-operative Society); Performer, a memoir, (2021,Te Puawai Co-operative Society), Solidarity, a Blackball novel (2023, Te Puawai Co-operative Society) and The Sculptor from Rūnanga, (2026, Te Puawai Co-operative Society). He has edited the Labour History Project Bulletin since 2019.

In the 2023 New Year Honours, Maunder was appointed a Member of the New Zealand Order of Merit, for services to the arts and the community.

== Filmography ==
- Gone Up North for a While (1972) National Film Unit
- The Seal Hunters (1973) Short film
- One of Those People that Live in the World (1973)
- Landfall (1975)
- Sons for the Return Home (1979)
- Freedom is dead rADz collection # 3 - see 11.49 (2000)

== Plays ==
Most of Maunder's plays are on subjects related to politics, class, activism, the history of the labour movement or the NZ experience.

- I Rode My Horse Down the Road (with Amamus) 1971, Downstage
- The Wall Street Banks in London Have Closed (with Amamus) 1972, Downstage
- '51 (full length, year unknown) documentary on the 1951 New Zealand waterfront dispute
- Strangers, Downstage
- Gallipoli, 1974 Unity Theatre and national tour
- Valita, 1976 Unity Theatre
- Oedipus, 1977 Unity Theatre
- Pictures, 1980 Wellington Art Gallery
- Electra, 1981 Mitchelltown Amphitheatre
- State of Play, 1982 The Depot
- Hemi 1983 Depot Theatre, Wellington.
- State of Play, (full length – no date or production listed)
- Ngati Pakeha, (1-act) 1983 – Depot Theatre, Wellington
- Desire in a New Age, (full length, year unknown)
- Prophets from the Margins, 2002
- Death (and Love) in Gaza, 2006 – BATS Theatre, Wellington
- Big End, 2007 – no known production yet
- Poison and Purity, 2010 Regent Theatre, Greymouth, Old Lodge, Hokitika, NBS Theatre, Westport
- Goodnight, Irene, 2011 Regent Theatre, Greymouth, Old Lodge Theatre, Hokitika, Dunedin Fringe.www.theatrevie.org.nz
- The Cave Above the Pa-, 2012 Regent Theatre, Greymouth, Old Lodge Theatre, Hokitika. www.theatreview.org.nz
- The Judgement of Ben Alder, 2013 Regent Theatre, Greymouth, Old Lodge Theatre, Hokitika, NBS Theatre, Westport, Motueka Players, SYmposium of APplied Theatre, Auckland. www.theatreview.org.nz
- Ted, Poppy and World War Two, 2014 Regent Theatre- Greymouth, Old Lodge, Hoktika, NBS Theatre, Westport, Lyttleton Boating Club, Riverside Community Hall, Riverside.www.theatreview.org.nz
- A Brief History of Madness, 2015 Regent Theatre, Greymouth, Seavie Hall, Seaview, NBS Theatre, Westport, Mapua Hall
- The Measures Taken, Regent Theatre, Greymouth, Old Lodge, Hokitika, NBS Theatre, Westport, Oddfellows Hall, Reefton. www.theatreview.org.nz
- Helen and the Ferals, Regent Theatre, Greymouth, Old Lodge, Hokitika, Mapua Community Hall
- Whenua/DP4 Lot 173, Regent Theatre, Greymouth, Old Lodge, Hokitika, House performance, Motueka
