= Redemption Hill =

New Zealand reality series

- Created by: Glenn Sims
- Starring: Steve Boxer (warden)
- Country of origin: New Zealand
- No. of episodes: 10

Production
- Executive producers: Glenn Sims, Ross Jennings
- Running time: 60 min
- Production companies: RedFlame TV; Screentime

Original release
- Network: TV2
- Release: 2006

Redemption Hill was a New Zealand reality series that followed 10 teenagers identified as being likely to enter a life of crime. The teenagers were selected from a call for participants throughout New Zealand, many nominated by their parents.

Redemption Hill involved a course of discipline and adventure activities, organised by a "warden" (Steve Boxer). It also involved time behind bars in Napier prison, which was decommissioned in 1993 and subsequently turned into a tourist attraction.

The show was filmed on location at Napier Prison, which is New Zealand's oldest prison.

== Season one ==
=== The Teens ===
- Aaron
- Brigitte
- Ebonee
- Jesse
- Jessica
- Jeremy
- Jonathon
- Khelsie
- Luke
- Samantha

=== Updates ===
A year after the show was first broadcast, just before midnight on 20 April 2007, teen participant Aaron Mark Lambert was killed in a high-speed crash in his home town of Hamilton.

On the 28 July 2009, another show participant Jesse Young died following an accident where he was hit by a motor vehicle.
