= Mark Raffety =

British-Australian actor

- Born: Portsmouth, England, UK
- Occupation: Actor
- Years active: 1991–present

Mark Raffety is a British-Australian actor, perhaps best known for playing Darcy Tyler in the Australian soap opera Neighbours from 2000 to 2005 and 2025.

== Early life ==
Raffety was born in Portsmouth, England. He has a younger brother and sister. Their father was a Royal Navy submariner. After he left the Navy, the family moved to Australia when Rafferty was 18 months old. When Raffety was eight years old, his father found work as an engineer in New Zealand and the family moved again. They then moved around between Australia and New Zealand.

In New Zealand, Raffety developed a passion for painting, and he initially started out his career as an illustrator. However, when Raffety's then-girlfriend suggested he audition for a television commercial, he went along and secured the part. Another commercial followed, with Raffety cast in the lead and he decided that he wanted to be in the acting industry.

== Career ==
After unsuccessfully auditioning for a different role in long-running soap opera Neighbours, the producers created the role of Doctor Darcy Tyler for him, which he began playing in November 2000. The following year he became a regular cast member. His character was introduced as Susan Kennedy's (Jackie Woodburne) nephew, and he became a love interest for Dee Bliss (Madeleine West).

In early 2003, producers decided to write the character out. He reprised the role for several episodes in 2004 and again in 2005, and he returned to Neighbours as Darcy once more in March 2025.

After his first stint on Neighbours in 2003, Raffety appeared in an episode of the police drama Stingers as a stockbroker. Following the tradition of many other Neighbours acting alumni, he also performed in pantomimes in the UK, including Dick Whittington as King Rat and Snow White and the Seven Dwarfs as Prince Charming. He has also appeared in productions of Steven Berkoff's Greek and Peter and the Wolf.

Raffety has also appeared in guest roles in several other television series, including Hercules: The Legendary Journeys and Xena: Warrior Princess, The Secret Life of Us and Satisfaction. He also appeared in the New Zealand Second World War-era film The Last Tattoo in 1994.

== Filmography ==
=== Film ===
Year	Title	Role	Notes
1994	The Last Tattoo	Johnny O'Rourke	
1999	I'll Make You Happy	Harry	
2007	Dutch Courage	Scott James	Short film
2008	Little Wings	Tom	Short film
2014	The Bench		Short film
2014	Summer Gone	Tom (Father)	Short film
2015	Close to Home	Father	Short film

=== Television ===
Year	Title	Role	Notes
1991	Gold: Frenchie's Gold	Sullivan	TV movie
1992	The Ray Bradbury Theater	Cooper	Anthology series, 1 episode
1992	Homeward Bound	Dan Johnstone	
1995; 1996	Xena: Warrior Princess	Arkel / Hyperion	2 episodes
1997; 1998	Hercules: The Legendary Journeys	Prince of Antioch / Acteon	2 episodes
2000–2005; 2025	Neighbours	Darcy Tyler	Series regular
	The Secret Life of Us		
2003	Stingers	Martin Kelly	1 episode
2006	The Society Murders	Damian Honan	TV movie
2008	Satisfaction	Ralph	3 episodes
2011	City Homicide	Steven Akkerman	1 episode

== Theatre ==
Year	Title	Role	Notes
2002–2003	Dick Whittington	King Rat	Kings Theatre, Southsea
2003–2004	Dick Whittington	King Rat	Tameside Hippodrome, Ashton
2004–2005	Snow White and the Seven Dwarfs	Prince Charming	Grand Opera House, York
2007–2008	Snow White and the Seven Dwarfs	Prince Charming	Kings Theatre, Southsea
