= Homeward Bound (New Zealand TV series) =

New Zealand television series

- Genre: Soap opera
- Created by: Ross Jennings
- Developed by: Michael Anthony Noonan; Judy Callingham; Ross Jennings; Tom Parkinson; Robin Scholes; Ian Hogg
- Written by: Michael Anthony Noonan; Judy Callingham
- Directed by: Ross Jennings; Richard Riddiford; Murray Reece; Mark Beesley
- Starring: Michael Daly; Liddy Holloway; Mark Raffety; Francis Bell; Karl Urban; Sylvia Rands; Peter Elliott; David Aston; June Bishop; Simone Kessell
- Theme music composer: Dave Dobbyn
- Opening theme: "Homeward Bound"
- Ending theme: "Homeward Bound"
- Composer: Billy Kristian
- Country of origin: New Zealand
- Original language: English
- No. of seasons: 1
- No. of episodes: 21 (1 x 2 hr pilot + 20 x 1 hrs)

Production
- Executive producers: Ross Jennings; Tom Parkinson; Robin Scholes; Alan Withrington
- Producer: Tom Parkinson
- Cinematography: Andy Coleman
- Editors: John Fraser; Kate Peacocke
- Running time: 88 minutes (episode 1/pilot); 44 minutes (episodes 2-21)
- Production company: Soap N.Z. Ltd.

Original release
- Network: TV3
- Release: 11 June – 29 October 1992

Homeward Bound is a New Zealand television soap opera. It was first broadcast on TV3 on 11 June 1992 and ran for 21 episodes (including the two-hour pilot), finishing on 29 October 1992. Created by Ross Jennings, Homeward Bound was TV3's bid for NZ On Air funding for a local soap opera, however, it ultimately lost out to TVNZ's Shortland Street and was reformatted as an hour-long drama series.

== Series overview ==
Plots centred on the domestic and professional lives of the extended Johnstone family and the residents of Riverside, a fictional rural community just south of the Bombay Hills. The area encompassed a pub and beer garden, a general store and garage, a community hall, a school, a church, a sawmill and a rubbish tip.

Homeward Bound was produced by Soap (NZ) Ltd, a joint venture between Isambard Productions and Communicado, with funding from NZ On Air. The series was broadcast on TV3 on Thursdays at 7.30pm from June until October 1992.

The theme tune was composed by New Zealand musician Dave Dobbyn.

== Cast ==
=== Main cast ===
- Michael Daly as Graeme Johnstone
- Liddy Holloway as Janine Johnstone
- Mark Raffety as Dan Johnstone
- Francis Bell as Bob Johnstone
- Karl Urban as Tim Johnstone
- Sylvia Rands as Suzanne Johnstone
- Peter Elliott as Neil Johnstone
- David Aston as Gordon Jonstone
- June Bishop as Isabella "Izzy" Johnstone
- Simone Kessell as Hannah Tumai

=== Guest and recurring cast ===
- Mandie Simons as Amy Johnstone
- Ben Alpers as Grant Johnstone
- Charlotte Woollams as Katey Johnstone
- Tina Grenville as Val Johnstone
- Rebekah Mercer as Wendy Johnstone
- Victoria Harrison as Sophie Johnstone
- Doug Aston as Uncle Haddon
- Margaret Murray as Auntie Beth
- Nancy Flyger as Mavis Bartlett
- Dai Evans as The Minister
- Waihoroi Shortland as Monte Tumai
- Eliza Bidois as Lisa Tumai
- John Watson as Det Sgt Kuipers
- Frank Whitten
- Hine Elder as Louise Harvey
- Michael Anthony Noonan as Toby Paykel
- Ken Blackburn as Noel Connor
- Tiara Lowndes as Kelly Marsh
- Alison Routledge as Charley
- Kelsey Howlett / Jonathan Mason as Jonty Harvey
- Jon Kernutt as Kieran Connor
- Helena Ross as Trisha Connor
- Alistair Browning as Dr McIntyre
- Ian Harrop as The Publican
- Jon Bridges as Andy

== Episodes ==
| No. | Title | Directed by | Written by | Original release date |
|---|---|---|---|---|
| 1 | Episode 1 (Pilot) | Ross Jennings | Michael Anthony Noonan | 11 June 1992 |
The Johnstone family reunion is about to begin. However, the arrival of two unexpected guests raises unanswered questions about the family's past. This episode was described by the NZ Listener as a pilot and ran for two hours in duration (including commercial breaks).
| 2 | Episode 2 | Ross Jennings | Michael Anthony Noonan and Judy Callingham | 18 June 1992 |
Graeme ruins Janine's plans and Gordon's behaviour places further stress on the family. Meanwhile, the Tumai family reunion answers one question but raises another.
| 3 | Episode 3 | Richard Riddiford | Michael Anthony Noonan and Judy Callingham | 25 June 1992 |
Riverside's increasing crime rate brings a police presence to the area and the Johnstones are affected in more ways than one. Tim has his hands full but saves the day.
| 4 | Episode 4 | Richard Riddiford | Michael Anthony Noonan and Judy Callingham | 2 July 1992 |
Grant's schoolwork suffers. Izzy thinks there are too many Australians in Riverside but Amy doesn't agree, though all is not well with Hannah. Janine tries her best for Graeme but is in for a bit of a shock.
| 5 | Episode 5 | Murray Reece | Michael Anthony Noonan and Judy Callingham | 9 July 1992 |
Hannah is thrown into the deep end of the Whanau programme and loses her patience and poise. At the farmhouse, Janine's problems increase when Amy and Grant have difficulties at school.
| 6 | Episode 6 | Mark Beesley | Michael Anthony Noonan and Judy Callingham | 16 July 1992 |
Tim feels pleased with himself. Katey overhears a conversation and spreads it and Lisa apologises for sleeping with a married man.
| 7 | Episode 7 | Mark Beesley | Michael Anthony Noonan and Judy Callingham | 23 July 1992 |
Tim is in trouble at home and with Kelly, and Lisa wavers between love - and money.
| 8 | Episode 8 | Mark Beesley | Michael Anthony Noonan and Judy Callingham | 30 July 1992 |
A surprise awaits Gordon on his return and Janine and Val are in for a shock when Dan's flatmate appears at a family gathering.
| 9 | Episode 9 | Mark Beesley | Michael Anthony Noonan and Judy Callingham | 6 August 1992 |
Amy pines - will distance make the heart grow fonder? Gordon is back and confesses the truth at last, and a birth certificate causes problems in the Johnstone households.
| 10 | Episode 10 | Richard Riddiford | Michael Anthony Noonan and Judy Callingham | 13 August 1992 |
Graeme's will is made public and Gordon plays the hero when Louise is left behind, but he resents Kuipers's questioning. "Gordon was always lying and manipulative as a child - as an adult he's simply perfected the art!"
| 11 | Episode 11 | Murray Reece | Michael Anthony Noonan and Judy Callingham | 20 August 1992 |
The children spend a day at the beach with unfortunate results. Can Gordon's intentions towards the family farm be taken at face value? Will Bob and Val put an end to the jokes?
| 12 | Episode 12 | Murray Reece | Michael Anthony Noonan and Judy Callingham | 27 August 1992 |
Gordon unburdens himself of a few confidences and Sophie and Katey discover gold.
| 13 | Episode 13 | Mark Beesley | Michael Anthony Noonan and Judy Callingham | 3 September 1992 |
Kuipers finds a skeleton or two and young love blossoms with Amy. Neil is treated badly and who is the woolly creature from the past?
| 14 | Episode 14 | Mark Beesley | Michael Anthony Noonan and Judy Callingham | 10 September 1992 |
Amy and Kieran's plans are delayed when a quiet day on the river raises more than they bargained for and Gordon is caught in a web of intrigue.
| 15 | Episode 15 | Richard Riddiford | Michael Anthony Noonan and Judy Callingham | 17 September 1992 |
The talks between the Connor and Johnstone families cause problems for all; Bob's leadership qualities go bush; Val stirs up more trouble than she can handle; and Louise is plagued by rumours.
| 16 | Episode 16 | Richard Riddiford | Michael Anthony Noonan and Judy Callingham | 24 September 1992 |
Sophie thinks she has been abandoned again and a surprise tenant takes over Louise's cottage - with even more surprises at the housewarming party. Janine has had enough but support comes from an unexpected quarter.
| 17 | Episode 17 | Murray Reece | Michael Anthony Noonan and Judy Callingham | 1 October 1992 |
Love is in the air and everyone seems susceptible - but which couples have a future together? The only person who seems to have any stability seems to be young Sophie.
| 18 | Episode 18 | Mark Beesley | Michael Anthony Noonan and Judy Callingham | 8 October 1992 |
Everyone's home lives seem to be in upheaval, apart from Amy and Kieran. Val's particular disaster has far-reaching consequences.
| 19 | Episode 19 | Mark Beesley | Michael Anthony Noonan and Judy Callingham | 15 October 1992 |
Hannah, Charley and Janine listen to a few home truths and Amy wonders if she and Kieran have a prayer.
| 20 | Episode 20 | Mark Beesley | Michael Anthony Noonan and Judy Callingham | 22 October 1992 |
Amy and Kieran make plans, and Neil and Janine make amends, but it's up to Suzanne to make everyone's day.
| 21 | Episode 21 | Mark Beesley | Michael Anthony Noonan and Judy Callingham | 29 October 1992 |
Hannah is miffed that no one seems to have remember her birthday. Gordon receives some unwelcome correspondence and Suzanne faces up to her past.
