= Michael A. Noonan =

New Zealand writer (1940/1941 – 2023)

- Born: Michael Anthony Noonan; 4 December 1940 Ireland
- Died: 11 June 2023 (aged 82) Auckland, New Zealand
- Language: English
- Genre: Screenwriting, television
- Spouse: Ros Noonan

Michael Anthony Noonan (4 December 1940 – 11 June 2023) was a New Zealand writer, most often associated with his writing for television drama series. He is usually credited under either his full name or as Michael A. Noonan, so as to be distinguished from New Zealand-born Australian writer Michael Noonan.

== Biography ==
Born on 4 December 1940, Noonan grew up in the southern South Island, in Dunedin and Oamaru. After leaving school he began writing, notably drama such as The Rattle, whilst supplementing his income through work in radio and stage acting and as a regional television newsreader. He moved to Auckland in 1965, where he began writing for television. In 1969, he became the first script editor for the newly created television drama department of the NZBC. In this capacity he worked alongside and helped mentor a group of new writing talent including the likes of Roger Hall and Fiona Kidman. He left his editing position in the early 1970s, and in the proceeding years scripted several series, notable among them early children's television series The Games Affair.

In the following years, Noonan formed a close working relationship with director Tony Isaac. In 1975 their collaboration won a Feltex Award for The Longest Winter, a docu-drama about the Great Depression. The same year saw the debut of Close to Home, for which Noonan and Isaac became a principal writer and director. This was to prove to be New Zealand's most successful soap opera until the launch of Shortland Street 17 years later. In 1977, Noonan wrote the docu-drama The Governor, based on the life of Sir George Grey. This series, also directed by Isaac, too was to become a New Zealand television landmark.

In 1979, Noonan became the first scriptwriter to be awarded a Robert Burns Fellowship by the University of Otago. During this time he wrote two series which were cancelled before going into production, notably one based on Bill Pearson's novel Coal Flat. The cancellation was, in part, due to financial concerns, especially given that The Governor had proved controversial over its high production costs. Television New Zealand was approached again over the Coal Flat project in 2002, but funding was declined. Noonan later successfully adapted Roger Hall's stage play Glide Time into a long-running television comedy series, Gliding On.

Noonan died in Auckland on 11 June 2023, at the age of 82.

== Filmography ==
=== Television ===
The numbers in writing credits refer to the number of episodes.

Title	Year	Credited as		Network	Notes
Title	Year	Creator	Writer	Network	Notes
Pukemanu	1971	No	Yes (2)	NZBC	Story editor
Section 7	1972	No	Yes (2)	NZBC	Story editor
An Awful Silence	1972	No	No	NZBC	Script editor Television film
Richard John Seddon - Premier	1973	No	Yes	NZBC	Television documentary film
The Longest Winter	1974	No	Yes	NZBC	
The Games Affair	1975	No	Script	NZBC	Credited as Michael Anthony Noonan
Close to Home	1975–1983	Yes	Yes (1,130)	Television One	
On the Day	1975	No	Yes		Television film Credited as Michael Anthony Noonan
The Governor	1977	Stories by	No	Television One	Credited as Michael Anthony Noonan
Loose Enz	1982	No	Yes (2)	Television One	Credited as Anthony Noonan
An Age Apart	1983	No	Yes (1)		Credited as Anthony Noonan
Mortimer's Patch	1984	No	Yes (1)	Television 2	Credited as Anthony Noonan
Homeward Bound	1992	Developer	Yes	TV3	Credited as Michael Anthony Noonan
