= Richard John Seddon - Premier =

- Directed by: Tony Isaac
- Written by: Michael Noonan
- Produced by: Tony Isaac
- Starring: Tony Currie
- Cinematography: Warren LePine
- Edited by: Jamie Selkirk
- Music by: Jack Body
- Release date: December 10, 1973
- Running time: 52 min
- Country: New Zealand
- Language: English

Richard John Seddon - Premier is a 1973 New Zealand television film. It is a dramatisation of a period of the life of New Zealand Premier Richard Seddon.

== Cast ==
- Tony Currie as Seddon
- Martyn Sanderson as Reeves
- Michael Haigh as McKenzie
- Jeremy Stephens as Taylor
- Charles Walker as Stout
- Joanna Derrill as Neill
- Marshall Marsden as Ward
- John Roberts as Russell
- John Barrett as Carroll
- James McFarlane as Ostler
- Sheila Hammond as Lady Spokesman
- Stephen Gledhill as First Secretary

== Reception ==
Roger Hall in NZ Listener wrote "Seddon was easily the best historical documentary that we've made in this country. It was well written, directed and acted and also had the advantage that someone was willing to spend a lot of money on it". The Press said the filmmakers "succeeded splendidly with its study of "King Dick", striking a delicate balance between Seddon, the great Liberal reformer, and Seddon, the bluff, scheming politician."

== Awards ==
Feltex Television Awards 1974

- Programme of the Year - Richard John Seddon - Premier - won
- Actor of the Year - Tony Currie - won
