= Jocko (TV series) =

New Zealand television series

- Written by: Julian Dickon; Bob Leamen
- Directed by: Roger Donaldson; Tony Wilson; Peter Muxlow; John Whitwell; Les Hansen
- Starring: Bruce Allpress; Desmond Kelly
- Composer: William Southgate
- Country of origin: New Zealand
- Original language: English
- No. of seasons: 2
- No. of episodes: 13

Production
- Producer: Mark DeFriest
- Running time: 23 minutes

Original release
- Release: 22 October 1981 – 10 August 1983

Jocko is a 1981 New Zealand television series about Jocko and his mate China, two wanderers who work as musterers and jacks-of-all-trades. It starred Bruce Allpress and Desmond Kelly. It had two series, the first starting in October 1981 and the second in June 1983. Allpress won the Feltex award for best actor in 1982 and 1984 while Kelly was nominated in 1982 and the show was nominated for best drama that same year.

Jocko was a spinoff of High Country, a "Friday Play" shown on Television One in May 1980. High Country was produced by Mark De Friest who bought in writers Julian Dickon and Earle Spencer to develop a story by Dick Shelton. The started working on the spinoff series before High Country aired.

Douglas McKenzie of The Press wrote after the first episode: "The weeks will tell whether Bruce Allpress and Desmond Kelly have the personality to carry off such broad characterisations, especially as nothing as subtle as facial expressions will have much of a chance under all the stubble". Ken Strongman, also from The Press, said an early episode was "first-rate entertainment: happy, rollicking and rumbustuous, so good that its few shortcomings slipped by almost unnoticed. On reflection, they did not much matter anyway." Strongman wrote during the second season "No, in these enlightened days, "Jocko" is a completely inexcusable and yet genuinely pleasurable programme. It is just good fun and wouldn't be if it all became serious and nonsexist. It's a problem, this, and someone, some time, will have to face it. Television usually reflects society. In the respect of changing sex roles, it is lagging behind."

== Cast ==
- Bruce Allpress as Jocko
- Desmond Kelly as China
