= Darien Takle =

New Zealand actor

Darien Takle ONZM
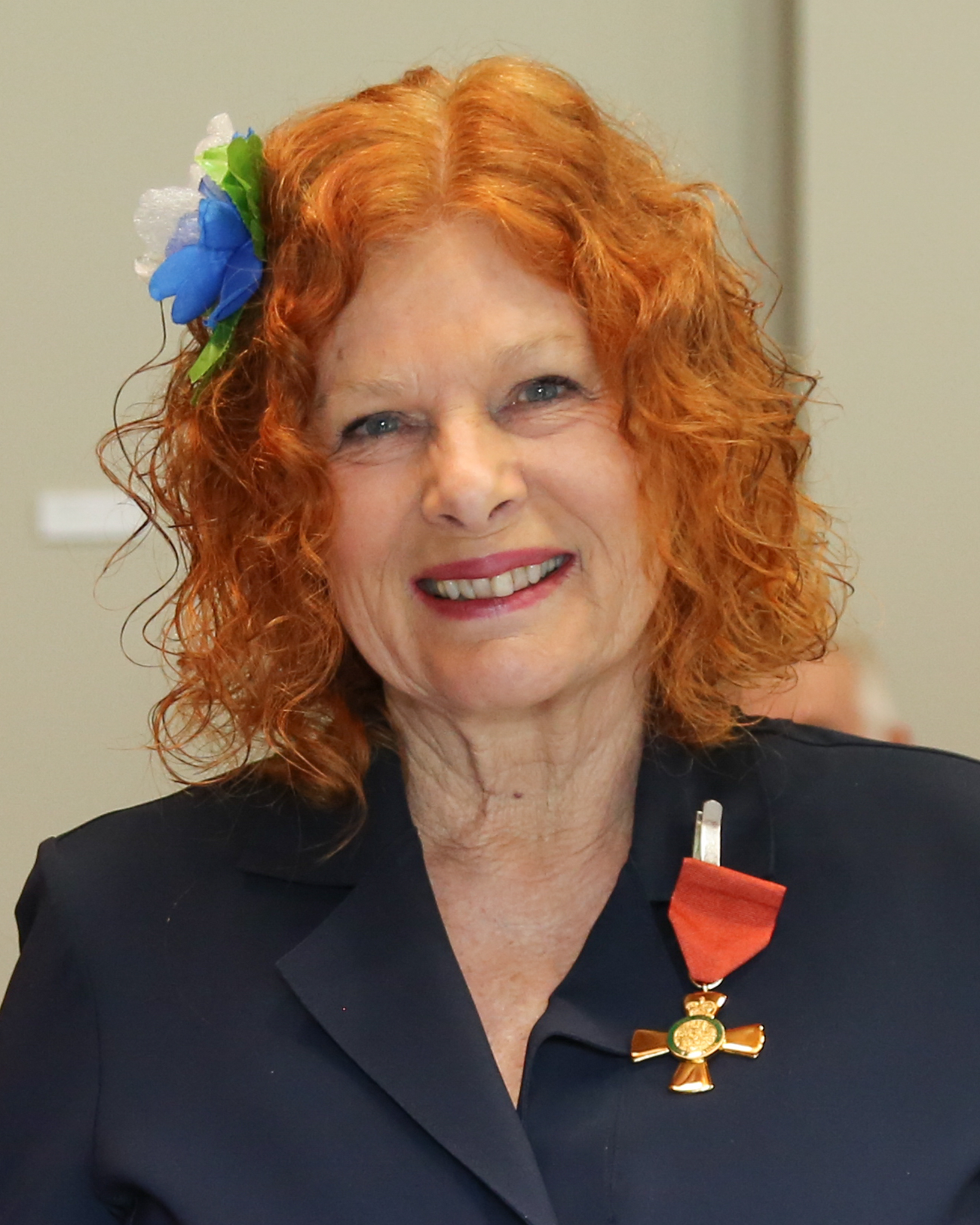
- Born: 1950; New Zealand
- Education: Toi Whakaari, Toi Whakaari
- Awards: Officer of the New Zealand Order of Merit

Darien Ruth Takle ONZM is a New Zealand actor, playwright and teacher. Takle is best known for playing Cyrene, Xena's mother in Xena: Warrior Princess. In 2021, Takle was appointed an Officer of the New Zealand Order of Merit for services to the performing arts.

== Early life and education ==
Takle was in Toi Whakaari: New Zealand Drama School's first intake in 1970, and graduated with a Bachelor of Performing Arts. She also earned a Diploma of Fine Arts at Auckland University’s Elam School of Fine Arts, specialising in sculpture, and two diplomas at Unitec Institute of Technology. She is married to musician Matthew Brown, and they have written several comedy shows together.

== Career ==
Takle's professional debut was at the Mercury Theatre in 1973. Receiving an Arts Council grant, Takle travelled to the UK where she toured in Godspell, and established her own theatre company in London. Returning to New Zealand, Takle devised and performed a show of Brecht/Weill songs, created the title role in Pam Gems's Piaf at Theatre Corporate, and wrote and performed a solo show about painter Frances Hodgkins, Wings Over Water.

Takle has performed internationally in the UK, America and Australia. She has appeared in multiple stage roles, including as Fantine in Les Miserables, Eva Peron in Evita, and Cordelia in King Lear. She has appeared in more than eight Roger Hall plays, including Taking Off and You Can Always Hand Them Back. Takle's television credits include Xena's mother Cyrene in Xena: Warrior Princess, and roles in Shortland Street, Marlin Bay, and Burying Brian. Film credits include the Headmistress in Heavenly Creatures, Marge in The Ugly, and Ruth Scarry in The Lost Tribe.

Takle has taught acting, and is known for her mentorship of young actors, filmmakers and playwrights. She has also recorded an album, No Regrets.

== Honours and awards ==
In the 2021 Queen's Birthday Honours, Takle was appointed an Officer of the New Zealand Order of Merit for services to the performing arts. At the 2003 New Zealand Film Awards, she won Best Performance in a Digital Feature for her role in Gregory King's Christmas.
