= Duggan (TV series) =

- Genre: Drama
- Created by: Marion McLeod
- Directed by: Yvonne Mackay; John Laing
- Starring: John Bach; Toby Leach; Michele Amas; Fiona Mogridge; Scott Macky
- Composer: Gareth Farr
- Country of origin: New Zealand
- Original language: English
- No. of seasons: 1
- No. of episodes: 11

Production
- Executive producer: Dorothee Pinfold
- Producers: Dave Gibson; Jan Haynes
- Cinematography: Leon Narbey
- Editor: Paul Sutorius
- Production company: Gibson Group

Original release
- Network: Television One
- Release: 20 July – 28 September 1999

Duggan is a TVNZ police drama from 1997, featuring New Zealand actor John Bach as Detective Inspector John Duggan and Fiona Mogridge as Ruth Duggan. Unlike other New Zealand police drama series, Duggan was initially intended to be produced as a series of one-off programmes, akin to British crime series of the time such as Inspector Morse and Midsomer Murders. Two stories were filmed in this way, one each in 1997 and 1998, before the decision was made to produce a series of 11 episodes in 1999. All episodes except for the first two were one hour in length; the first two were two hours long.

== Premise ==
Duggan follows the investigations of John Duggan, an initially retired Police Detective Inspector who becomes involved in various murder investigations near his home in the Marlborough Sounds at the top of the South Island of New Zealand. As such, the show mainly takes place in the Sounds, Picton and Wellington.

Having retired from his job after the death of his wife, he is initially reluctant to resume his police work. However, he is convinced back in the first telefeature, Death in Paradise. Through the show, he works to uncover complex murder plots against the backdrop of small-town New Zealand in the late 1990s.

Ironically, production of the series was briefly delayed by a major real-life crime, the 1998 New Year's Day murder of Ben Smart and Olivia Hope.

== List of episodes ==
=== Introductory episodes ===
No. overall	No. in season	Title	Directed by	Written by	Original release date
1	1	"Death in Paradise"	Yvonne Mackay	Ken Duncum and Donna Malane	13 October 1997
2	2	"Sins of the Fathers"	Yvonne Mackay	Ken Duncum and Donna Malane	7 September 1998

=== Season 1 (1999) ===
No. overall	No. in season	Title	Directed by	Written by	Original release date
3	1	"Workshop for Murder"	Mike Smith	Judy Callingham	20 July 1999
4	2	"A Shadow of Doubt: Part 1"	Yvonne Mackay	Donna Malane	27 July 1999
5	3	"A Shadow of Doubt: Part 2"	Yvonne Mackay	Donna Malane	3 August 1999
6	4	"Time and Tide"	Mike Smith	Linda Burgess	10 August 1999
7	5	"Going Overboard"	John Reid	Paul Yates	17 August 1999
8	6	"Murder at Te Papa"	John Laing	Donna Malane	24 August 1999
9	7	"Sneakers"	Mike Smith	Ken Duncum	31 August 1999
10	8	"Dog's Breakfast"	John Reid	William Brandt	7 September 1999
11	9	"Moving House"	John Laing	Damien Wilkins	14 September 1999
12	10	"Last Resort"	Mike Smith	Ken Duncum	21 September 1999
13	11	"Food to Die For"	Mike Smith	Judy Callingham	28 September 1999
