= The Games Affair =

- Genre: Drama
- Created by: Bruce Clark; Matthew Simes
- Screenplay by: Michael Anthony Noonan
- Directed by: Bruce Clark
- Starring: Brent Bullis; Debbie Gowland; Dominic Solia; John Bach; Herb Gott; Lynsay Laws; Elizabeth McRae; Tom Poata
- Composer: Ross Harris
- Country of origin: New Zealand
- Original language: English
- No. of seasons: 1
- No. of episodes: 6

Production
- Producer: Grahame McLean
- Cinematography: Paul Leach
- Editor: Michael Horton
- Running time: 24 minutes
- Production company: Endeavour Television Productions

Original release
- Network: NZBC
- Release: 22 February – 28 March 1975

The Games Affair (1975), directed by Bruce Clark, is New Zealand's first children’s television series. The Games Affair was a six-part fantasy-thriller series broadcast by the New Zealand Broadcasting Corporation where 3 teenagers unintentionally become involved with exposing the no-good antics of a professor and his two assistants during the Christchurch Xth Commonwealth Games.

== Synopsis ==
The show begins with Henry Ropata and his son Chris arriving at Harewood Airport to pick up Australian teenager Alley Jones and Canadian Paul Chapman whom they are housing during the Commonwealth Youth Conference, held in conjunction with the Games. They stumble upon a mad professor who, along with his two assistants, attempt to shoot athletes with powerful performance enhancing drugs during the Games.

== Cast ==
Heroes

- Brent Bullis
- Debbie Gowland
- Dominic Solia

Villains

- John Bach
- Herb Gott
- Lynsay Laws

Others

- Elizabeth McRae
- Tom Poata

== Episodes ==
1. "A Question of Possibility"
2. "The Porcelain Runner"
3. "A Rude Awakening"
4. "This Time We Have Them"
5. "Day of Triumph"
6. "Back to the Beginning"

== Notable moments ==
- An elderly lady watching the athletic events is inadvertently hit with the enhancer when the assistant wielding the dart gun is distracted. As a result, the elderly lady ends up running and winning the 100-meter sprint.
- A traffic officer stopping the scientist's car due to it being unregistered and unsafe is shot with the enhancer. After doing several super fast star jumps, the officer frantically runs away from the scene faster than his motorcycle.
- A high diver shot with the enhancer breaks through the ceiling and flies quite a distance, surprising the passengers of an NAC Boeing 737 before landing in a river some miles away from the stadium.
