= The Governor (New Zealand TV series) =

- Based on: Stories by Michael Anthony Noonan
- Written by: Keith Aberdein
- Directed by: Tony Isaac; Hugh Macdonald; Peter Muxlow
- Starring: Corin Redgrave; Judy Cleine; Auton Lowe
- Composer: Ross Harris
- Country of origin: New Zealand
- Original languages: English; Maori
- No. of episodes: 6

Production
- Executive producers: Michael Scott-Smith; Tom Williamson
- Producer: Tony Isaac
- Cinematography: Kell Fowler; John Toon
- Editor: Jamie Selkirk; Simon Reece
- Production companies: Television One; National Film Unit

Original release
- Network: Television One
- Release: 2 October – 6 November 1977

The Governor is a 1977 New Zealand docudrama television miniseries on Sir George Grey, co-produced by Television One and the National Film Unit, with Grey played by English actor Corin Redgrave. There are six parts, screened from Sunday 2 October 1977; the series has not been rescreened as TV One omitted to obtain repeat rights.

The series is about Sir George Grey as Governor of New Zealand from 1845 to 1853 and 1861–68. In the nineteenth century he was both Governor and (later) Prime Minister of New Zealand, and Governor of South Australia and Governor of the Cape Colony. Neville describes him as "a Victorian gentleman, a drug addict (he used laudanum) and a lecher". The cost (with over-runs) was $1 million, and Prime Minister Rob Muldoon instigated an investigation by the parliamentary public expenditure committee into budgeting and the control of expenditure in television. The series also aroused controversy because of the emphasis on Grey's private life, and the dialogue in the Māori language, often without subtitles.

Keith Aberdein wrote the script, from an idea by Michael A. Noonan, and carried out his own historical research and interviews. The series was produced by Tony Isaac. It won the 1978 Feltex Award for best drama, and Episode 4 won the award for best script. The series was only aired in New Zealand and Australia. People can now view the whole series on YouTube.

== Episodes ==
1. The Reverend Traitor: Grey and the missionary Henry Williams (Grant Tilly)
2. No Way to treat a Lady: Grey and his wife Eliza (Judy Cleine)
3. The Mutinous Lieutenant: Grey and Edward John Eyre (Jeremy Stephens)
4. He Iwi Tahi Tatou (now we are one people): Grey and Wiremu Tamihana (Don Selwyn)
5. The Lame Seagull: Grey's war with British general Sir Duncan Cameron (Martyn Sanderson).
6. To the Death: Grey in the Mansion House on Kawau Island, looking back
