= Loose Enz =

- Country of origin: New Zealand
- Original language: English
- No. of seasons: 1
- No. of episodes: 12

Production
- Producer: Tony Isaac
- Running time: 30-60 minutes

Original release
- Release: February 28 – May 16, 1982

Loose Enz is a 1982 New Zealand anthology television series. It was a series of 12 New Zealand plays broadcast on Sunday nights. The standalone plays covered many subjects such as Maori land rights, politics, foreign land ownership, rehabilitation, and sex and marriage. Looking back at the previous years television Ken Strongman of the Press wrote of the series "The "Loose Enz" series was a fine idea, but the plays themselves were mostly so lightweight as to float instantly from memory,"

== Episodes ==
- Tough at the Bottom

Writer: Grant Morris. Director: Peter Muxlow

- Coming and Going

Writer Bill Baer. Director: Murray Reece
Based on a story by Dan Davin

- The Venus Touch

Writer and director: Keith Aberdein

- The Good Samaritan

Writer: Jane Toft. Director: John Anderson

- Free Enterprise

Writer: Greg McGee. Director: Mark DeFriest

- If the Cat Laps

Writer: Vincent O'Sullivan. Director: John Anderson

- Graham's Mum and the Golden Tour

Writer: Michael A. Noonan. Director: Murray Reece
Based on a story by Murray Reece

- That Bread Should Be So Dear

Writer: Olwynne MaCrae. Director: Murray Reece

- Eros and Psyche

Writer: Michael A. Noonan. Director: John Anderson

- Press for Service

Writer: Tom Scott. Director: Tony Wilson

- The Pumice Land

Writer: S. G. Walker. Director: Murray Reece

- The Protesters

Writer: Rowley Habib. Director: Peter Muxlow

== Awards ==
Feltex Television Awards 1982

- Best Script – Rowley Habib for The Protesters – won
- Best Script – Michael A. Noonan for Eros and Psyche – nominated
- Best Script – S.G. Walker for The Pumice Land – nominated
- Best Script – Grant Morris for Tough at the Bottom – nominated
- Best Actor – Derek Hardwick for The Pumice Land – nominated
- Best Actor – David McPhail for Coming and Going – nominated
- Best Actor – Don Selwyn for The Protesters – nominated
- Best Actor – Jim Moriaty for The Protesters – nominated
- Best Actress – Heather Lindsay for The Good Samaritan – nominated
- Best Drama – Eros and Psyche (John Anderson) – nominated
- Best Drama – Graham's Mum and the Golden Tour (Murray Reece) – nominated
- Best Drama – That Bread Should Be So Dear (Katherine de Nave) – nominated
- Best Drama – The Pumice Land (Tony Isaac) – nominated
- Stan Hosgood Award – Dean Cato (The Pumice Land) – nominated
- Stan Hosgood Award – Graham Henderson (The Protesters) – nominated
