= Close to Home (1975 TV series) =

New Zealand television series

- Genre: Soap opera
- Created by: Michael Noonan; Tony Isaac
- Starring: Ilona Rodgers; John Bach; Ian Gilmour; Tony Currie; Bill Stalker; Dorothy Smith; Des Swain; Joanne Mildenhall; Jamie Higgins; Jennifer Ward-Lealand; Sarah Delahunty
- Composer: Jack Body
- Country of origin: New Zealand
- Original language: English

Production
- Executive producer: Michael Scott-Smith
- Producers: Tony Isaac; Ross Jennings

Original release
- Network: Television One
- Release: 12 May 1975 – 30 August 1983

Close to Home is a New Zealand television soap opera which ran on Television One (later becoming Television New Zealand) from 1975 to 1983. Set in a suburb of Wellington, it originally revolved around the trials and tribulations of the Hearte family. Most of the Hearte children were written out of the show within its first two years. The older members of the Hearte family remained through most of the show's run and later storylines revolved around their interactions with neighbours and friends. A high point of the series occurred in 1982 with the wedding of Gayle and Gavin.

Rehearsals took place in a local community hall in Avalon, and “Close to Home” was mostly shot in the largest NZBC TV studio, No 8, at Avalon Studios, Avalon, Lower Hutt, which had sets round the studio of rooms in various characters’ houses plus the bar of the local hotel. It was criticised for the number of scenes set in the bar, but that was the only place apart from private homes that scenes could be set in without going on location, which was infrequent. The show featured John Bach, who went on to have his own TV series, Duggan, and appear in various films. Jennifer Ward-Lealand appeared as a school friend of Gayle's after Fiona Lovatt's contract expired. Jim Moriarty played a school teacher. Other cast members included Pat Evison, Ginette McDonald, and, in a special appearance, The Kokatahi Band.

Harry Lavington played Ken Paget the baker, and was a full-time actor for seven years; He recalls that the show had a "tight schedule. We read through the scripts on Monday morning, while sets and locations were being set up. Monday afternoon and Tuesday we rehearsed. Scripts were put down on Wednesday, and on Thursday and Friday complete performances were needed in front of the camera, with no prompter to read from." Lavington was from Cardiff, and an episode was shot in Cardiff with Ken returning home to see his parents as his mother was in poor health.

Scriptwriters included Marilyn Duckworth (5 in 1975-76).

Its replacement series, Country GP, starring Lani Tupu, did not enjoy as successful a run in the same timeslot.
