= List of films set in New Zealand =

This is a list of films filmed and set in New Zealand.

== The earliest short films — 1898–1910 ==
| Year | Film name |
|---|---|
| 1898 | Opening of the Auckland Industrial and Mining Exhibition |
| 1898 | Māori Scenes |
| 1898 | Uhlan winning the Auckland Cup at Ellerslie Racecourse |
| 1900 | The Departure of the Second Contingent for the Boer War |
| 1900 | The World's First Lady Mayor |
| 1901 | Royal Visit of the Duke and Duchess of Cornwall and York to New Zealand |
| 1903 | A Message from Mars |

== The early years — 1911–1940 ==
| Year | Film name |
|---|---|
| 1913 | Loved by a Maori Chieftess |
| 1913 | Hinemoa |
| 1913 | How Chief Te Ponga Won His Bride |
| 1913 | The River Wanganui |
| 1914 | Hinemoa |
| 1916 | A Maori Maid's Love |
| 1921 | The Betrayer |
| 1921 | Beyond |
| 1922 | The Birth of New Zealand |
| 1922 | My Lady of the Cave |
| 1924 | Venus of the South Seas |
| 1925 | Rewi's Last Stand |
| 1925 | The Adventures of Algy |
| 1927 | Carbine's Heritage |
| 1927 | The Romance of Hine-Moa |
| 1927 | Under the Southern Cross |
| 1927 | The Te Kooti Trail |
| 1928 | The Bush Cinderella |
| 1929 | Under the Southern Cross |
| 1935 | Down on the Farm |
| 1935 | Hei Tiki |
| 1936 | Phar Lap's Son |
| 1936 | The Wagon and the Star |
| 1936 | On the Friendly Road |
| 1940 | Rewi's Last Stand |

== The quiet years — 1941–1975 ==
| Year | Film name | Notes |
|---|---|---|
| 1947 | Green Dolphin Street | Set in, but not filmed in, New Zealand |
| 1952 | Broken Barrier | |
| 1954 | The Seekers | |
| 1955 | Battle Cry | Partially set in, but not filmed in, New Zealand |
| 1957 | Until They Sail | Set in, but not filmed in, New Zealand, apart from location shots |
| 1961 | Two Loves | Set in, but not filmed in, New Zealand |
| 1962 | In Search of the Castaways | Partially set in, but not filmed in, New Zealand |
| 1964 | Runaway | |
| 1966 | Don't Let it Get You | |
| 1972 | To Love a Maori | |
| 1973 | Rangi's Catch | |

== The early modern era — 1976–1985 ==
| Year | Film name |
|---|---|
| 1977 | Sleeping Dogs |
| 1977 | Off the Edge |
| 1977 | Solo |
| 1979 | Middle Age Spread |
| 1980 | Beyond Reasonable Doubt |
| 1980 | Goodbye Pork Pie |
| 1980 | Squeeze |
| 1980 | Nutcase |
| 1981 | Bad Blood |
| 1981 | Smash Palace |
| 1981 | Wildcat |
| 1981 | Pictures |
| 1981 | Race for the Yankee Zephyr |
| 1982 | The Scarecrow |
| 1982 | Prisoners |
| 1983 | Utu |
| 1983 | Patu! |
| 1984 | Death Warmed Up |
| 1984 | Trial Run |
| 1984 | Mesmerized |
| 1985 | Came a Hot Friday |
| 1985 | The Quiet Earth |
| 1985 | The Lost Tribe |
| 1985 | Kingpin |
| 1985 | Sylvia |
| 1985 | Shaker Run |

== The international era — 1986– ==
| Year | Film name |
|---|---|
| 1986 | Aces Go Places 4 |
| 1986 | Pallet on the Floor |
| 1986 | Bridge to Nowhere |
| 1986 | Queen City Rocker |
| 1987 | Bad Taste |
| 1987 | Ngati |
| 1987 | The Lie of the Land |
| 1987 | Among the Cinders |
| 1988 | The Navigator: A Medieval Odyssey |
| 1988 | Never Say Die |
| 1988 | The Grasscutter |
| 1989 | Mana Waka |
| 1990 | An Angel at My Table |
| 1990 | Ruby and Rata |
| 1990 | The Returning |
| 1991 | Old Scores |
| 1991 | The End of the Golden Weather |
| 1992 | Braindead |
| 1992 | Crush |
| 1992 | Alex |
| 1993 | Absent Without Leave |
| 1993 | Desperate Remedies |
| 1993 | Bread and Roses |
| 1993 | Jack Be Nimble |
| 1993 | The Piano |
| 1994 | Once Were Warriors |
| 1994 | Heavenly Creatures |
| 1995 | Bonjour Timothy |
| 1995 | Cinema of Unease |
| 1996 | Broken English |
| 1996 | The Whole of the Moon |
| 1999 | What Becomes of the Broken Hearted? |
| 1999 | The Price of Milk |
| 2001 | Crooked Earth |
| 2003 | Two Cars, One Night |
| 2003 | Whale Rider |
| 2003 | The Locals |
| 2003 | Perfect Strangers |
| 2004 | Doraemon: Nobita in the Wan-Nyan Spacetime Odyssey |
| 2004 | In My Father’s Den |
| 2005 | River Queen |
| 2005 | The World's Fastest Indian |
| 2006 | Sione's Wedding |
| 2006 | Out of the Blue |
| 2006 | Black Sheep |
| 2007 | The Devil Dared Me To |
| 2007 | The Tattooist |
| 2007 | The Ferryman |
| 2007 | Eagle vs. Shark |
| 2007 | Down by the Riverside |
| 2009 | Under the Mountain |
| 2010 | Tracker |
| 2010 | Matariki |
| 2010 | Boy |
| 2013 | Epic |
| 2014 | Lexi |
| 2014 | What We Do in the Shadows |
| 2014 | The Dark Horse |
| 2016 | Hunt for the Wilderpeople |
| 2017 | Pork Pie |
| 2018 | The Breaker Upperers |
| 2019 | Falling Inn Love |
| 2021 | Cousins |

== See also ==
- List of films based on location
- List of New Zealand films
- Cinema of New Zealand
