= Hilda Hayward =

New Zealand filmmaker (1898–1970)

- Born: Hilda Maud Moren; 26 September 1898; Takapuna, New Zealand
- Died: 3 January 1970 (aged 71)
- Occupation(s): Filmmaker; Cinema manager
- Spouse: Rudall Hayward (m. 1923; div. 1943)

Hilda Maud Hayward (née Moren, 26 September 1898 – 3 January 1970) was a pioneering New Zealand filmmaker. She is considered the country's first female camera operator.

== Early life ==
Hayward was born in Takapuna, on the North Shore, Auckland, on 26 September 1898. Her father, Frank Percy Moren, was an engineer and her mother, Maud Mauren (née Green), was a music teacher. Hayward's father drowned when she was young, and she was raised by her mother and grandmother.

== Adult life ==
Around 1922 Hayward met Rudall Hayward, a filmmaker, and they married at St Peter's Church, Takapuna, on 18 September 1923. Hayward learnt from her husband how to develop and edit film, and began to work with him on his projects. The couple set up home in Hayward's mother's house in Takapuna and built a darkroom there to work from. Her roles were varied - she managed the finances and budgets, ordered film stock, sourced actors, worked on costumes and make-up and picked locations for shooting. She also took photographs to use in advertising and publicity of the films.

Hayward co-edited the first version of Rewi’s Last Stand (1925) with her husband, and edited and processed the footage for The Te Kooti Trail (1927). Her editing has been praised by film writers for "constructing the subtleties of the narrative”. Hayward also edited the film The Bush Cinderella (1928) and the sound movie On the Friendly Road (1936).

Between 1925 and 1940, the couple made a series of 23 two-reel comedic silent shorts in small towns around New Zealand. Hayward designed and distributed publicity banners to attract local talent for a film, arranged the locations, helped with the photography, quickly edited the footage and then organised "world premiere" screenings of the film in the local cinema while interest was still high. In 1932, Hayward filmed the unemployment riots in Queen Street, Auckland, becoming the first woman to shoot cinema film in New Zealand.

In 1943, Hayward's marriage ended in divorce; seven days later, her husband married Ramai Te Miha, who had been the star of their 1940 re-make of Rewi's Last Stand. Hayward stopped making films and instead managed a cinema in Avondale, Auckland. She later contracted Huntington's disease and died on 3 January 1970; her body was cremated at Purewa Crematorium in Auckland. She was survived by her daughter, Phillippa Boak.

Although Hayward had worked with her husband on approximately 28 films, she did not receive screen credits for any of them and her husband did not talk about her contributions during interviews. Ngā Taonga Sound & Vision has researched her work and included her in newly written histories of film in the country.
