= The Wagon and the Star =

1936 New Zealand film

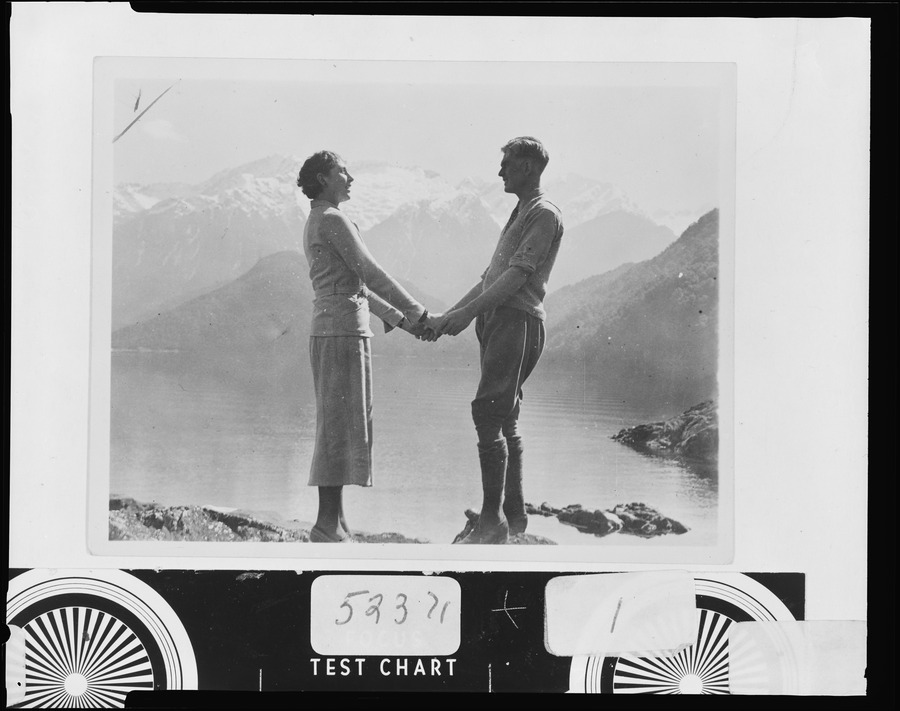
- Directed by: J.J.W. Pollard
- Written by: J.J.W. Pollard
- Produced by: J.J.W. Pollard
- Starring: John Peake; Faye Hinchey; William Buchan
- Cinematography: Lee Hill
- Music by: Howard Moody
- Release date: 1936
- Country: New Zealand
- Language: English
- Budget: £15,000

The Wagon and the Star (or The Waggon and the Star) is a 1936 New Zealand film by producer and director J.J.W. Pollard, who also wrote the screenplay. Only one reel of the film and some out-takes survived and is considered lost film by Ngā Taonga Sound & Vision. The handbuilt camera used was built by Ted Coubray and "confiscated" by Alexander Markey on the set of Hei Tiki.

The Wagon and the Star was the first sound feature film to be made in Southland. The film included two original songs, for which Pollard wrote the words and a local composer, Howard Moody, the music.

== Premise ==
Two migrants from "Home", John Hawthron and Andy Henderson from Scotland, meet on a road building gang. John has not yet made his fortune in the new country, but he eventually builds up a large transport and accommodation business and marries Mary, the daughter of a local landowner, despite the presence of a villainous local lawyer.

== Cast ==
Most of the cast were amateurs from the local operatic society in Invercargill.

- John Peake as John Hawthron
- Faye Hinchey as Mary Tyson
- William Buchan as Andy Henderson
- TR Vanity (Tom Pryde) as Hubert Throstle, the lawyer
- Moira O'Neill as Anne
- Richard Grenfell as the landowner
- Mary MacEwan as Mary's aunt

== Reception ==
The film had its premiere in Invercargill in July 1936. The Southland Times reported enthusiastically the next day: "The story is a slight one, but it is well-connected, more logical than those of most screen scenarists, and is admirably suited for conveying, without over-emphasis, the fact that Southland is a place of beauty."
