= Isobel Andrews =

New Zealand playwright, novelist, short-story writer and poet (1905–1990)

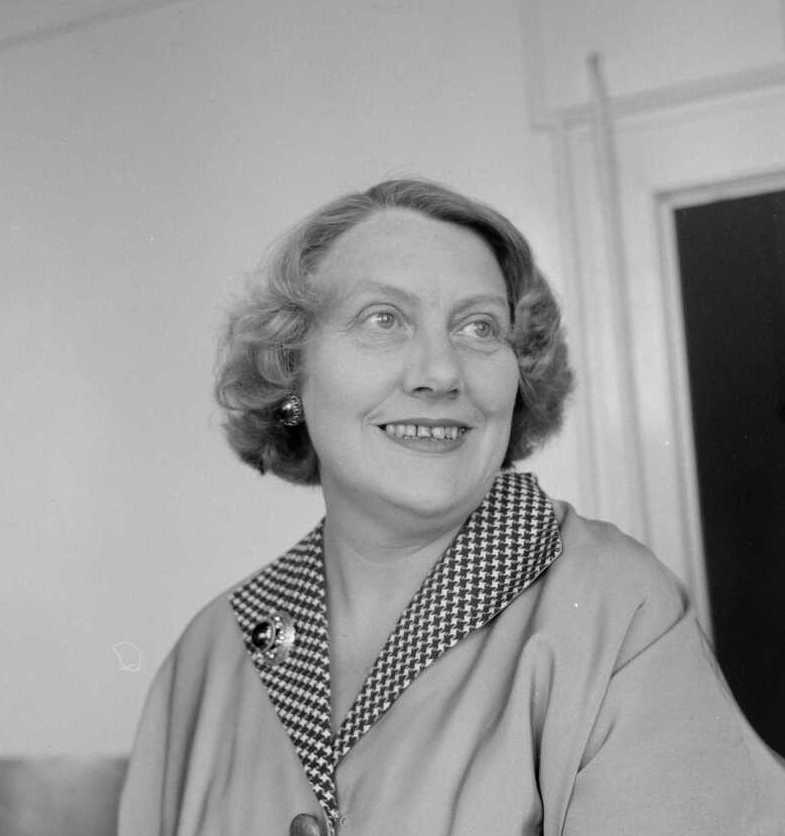
- Andrews in 1957
- Born: Isabella Smith Young; 2 November 1905; Glasgow, Scotland
- Died: 19 June 1990 (aged 84); Auckland, New Zealand
- Occupations: Playwright; short-story writer; poet
- Years active: 1935–74
- Notable work: The Willing Horse (1943); The Goldfish (1949)
- Spouse: Ernest Stanhope Andrews (m. 1932)
- Children: 2

Isabella Smith Andrews (née Young; 2 November 1905 – 19 June 1990), known professionally as Isobel Andrews, was a New Zealand playwright, novelist, short-story writer and poet. She wrote over sixty plays, many of which were published, and was associated with the New Zealand branch of the British Drama League. She won the League's annual playwrighting competition four times. Her plays, particularly The Willing Horse, have continued to be performed into the 21st century.

== Early life and marriage ==
Andrews was born in Glasgow on 2 November 1905. Her parents were Jeanie Scott and James Young, a mercantile clerk. Her family moved to New Zealand in 1911, living first in Bulls and then in Wellington, where she attended Wellington Girls College. On 19 December 1932 she married Ernest Stanhope Andrews, a public servant, who became the founding director of New Zealand's National Film Unit in 1941.

== Early writing career ==
Andrews was a founding member of the New Zealand Women Writers' and Artists' Society (later the New Zealand Women Writers' Society), which was established in July 1932, and remained involved with the organisation for many years. In 1933 her short story "The Romantic" won first prize in a competition for detective stories run by the Society, and was published the following year in the New Zealand Railways Magazine. In 1938 she won a radio competition for her play Endeavour. In September 1939 her short story "Even If We Are At War" was the second short story published by the New Zealand Listener magazine, and it was reprinted in New Zealand Listener Short Stories, Vol 2 (1978). A collection of her short stories was published in 1944 as Something to Tell. A newspaper review in The Nelson Evening Mail praised her "well-told stories strongly seasoned with local atmosphere", and said "the scenes she portrays and the characters she delineates will be readily recognised, for we have met their counterparts in town and country." In 1947 she was elected to the executive committee of PEN New Zealand.

== Playwriting and later career ==
She was the founder and principal playwright for a drama club, the Strathmore Players, one of many flourishing drama clubs established under the New Zealand Branch of the British Drama League. She wrote over 60 plays which usually involved scenes of domestic life with all-female casts (particularly during World War II when there were limited male actors available). She won four of the League's original play awards, including for The Willing Horse (published in 1943 and reprinted in 1962), which remains her best-known play. It is a comedy with roles for ten women, and set in a small rural town, with themes of marriage and isolation in a rural farming community. In 1943 it was awarded the Dairy Exporter Cup for the best play by a New Zealander and the Sir Michael Myers Cup for the best play produced. She also wrote plays for radio which were aired by the New Zealand Broadcasting Service, the Australian Broadcasting Commission and the BBC. In 1947 the Wellington Thespians staged a week-long season of Andrews' plays, including The Goldfish, which won the Dairy Exporter Cup in 1948 for being the best play written by a New Zealander. In 1949 it was published by George G. Harrap and Co. in The Best One-Act Plays of 1948–49 and it was subsequently performed on numerous occasions overseas.

In 1951 Andrews and her family moved to Whangārei, where she became the president of the Whangarei Repertory Society, and from 1958 to 1960 was the joint editor of Northland: A Regional Magazine, published by the Northland Women Writers' Group. She became a frequent contributor to the New Zealand Listener, writing short stories and radio reviews. M. H. Holcroft, the editor of the Listener for eighteen years, said in his autobiography that Andrews could "turn in a story of exceptional quality". Her 1957 one-act thriller Sunny Afternoon was her third play to be published in England, after The Willing Horse and The Goldfish.

In 1969 she was one of the principal speakers at a PEN New Zealand writers' conference, and the following year sat on the national executive of the New Zealand Drama Council. In 1961 she and her family moved to Auckland. In 1967 she was awarded a Scholarship in Letters by the New Zealand Literary Fund, which enabled her to write her first novel, Return to Marara (1969), followed by a sequel Exit with Emeralds (1971). A review of Return to Marara in newspaper The Press said "this diverting book transcends the usual limits of [romantic fiction]", and described it as a "well-observed picture of a growing New Zealand town" in which Andrews "shows an inspired sense of the ridiculous". She also wrote the script for the romantic documentary film To Love a Maori (1972), directed by Rudall Hayward, and Matenga – Māori Choreographer (1974), produced by Hayward and directed by Arthur Thompson.

== Legacy ==
The Willing Horse continues to be performed, with performances by the Circa Theatre in 2000 (featuring Dorothy McKegg and Elizabeth McRae) and by the South Otago Theatrical Society in 2002. In October 2020 it was performed at the Whangārei Fringe Festival by two teachers and ten students from Whangarei Girls' High School. The student actors said that the play gave them an insight into the lives of women in the 1940s and the limited career options available.

In 2015 Rekha Sisodia directed Andrews' play The Bride from the Hills translated into Hindi by Mridula Garg and performed as Dulhan Ek Pahad Ki at the National Theatre Festival Alfaaz 2015, organised by Natyansh Society of Dramatic and Performing Arts. Natyansh has performed this play in various theatre festivals across India in Hindi and English.

== Selected works ==
=== Plays ===
- Sudden Rain (1935)
- The Best Seller (1937)
- The Willing Horse (The Progressive Publishing Society: Wellington, 1943; Paul's Book Arcade: Hamilton, 1962)
- The Real Betrayal (1943)
- When the Rangiora Blows (1944)
- The Goldfish (S. French: London, 1949, 1954), also published in The Best One-Act Plays of 1948–49 (Harrap: London, 1950)
- A Sunny Afternoon in Spring (S. French: London, 1957)
- The Bride from the Hills (1962; London, 1963)

=== Short stories ===
- Something to Tell, collection (The Progressive Publishing Society: Wellington, 1944)

=== Novels ===
- Return to Marara (Whitcombe & Tombs: Christchurch, 1969; Hale: London, 1969)
- Exit with Emeralds (Whitcombe & Tombs: Christchurch, 1971; Hale: London, 1971)

=== Documentary scripts ===
- To Love a Maori (1972)
- Matenga – Māori Choreographer (1974)
