= Under the Southern Cross =

Under the Southern Cross may refer to:

Films

- Under the Southern Cross (1927 film), a British film
- Under the Southern Cross (1929 film), an American film
- Under the Southern Cross (1938 film), an Italian film directed by Guido Brignone

Songs

- Under the Southern Cross I Stand is the victory song of the Australian cricket team.

Plays

- Under the Southern Cross, an American play by Christian Reid
