= Towhead =

Towhead may refer to:

== People ==
- Ramon Berenguer II, Count of Barcelona (1053 or 1054–1082), called Cap de estopes (the Towhead)
- William III, Duke of Aquitaine (913–963), called Towhead
- A person with light blond hair

== Places ==
- A river island, a term often used in the Midwestern United States
- Towhead Island, Union District, Jackson County, West Virginia, now submerged
- Towhead Island - see List of islands of Washington
- Towhead Creek, a tributary of the Wakarusa River, Kansas

== Arts and entertainment ==
- A novel by Sarah Pratt McLean Greene
- Towhead, female lead character in Heaven on Earth (1931 film)
- Towhead, a character in The Hot Rod Dogs and Cool Car Cats, an animated television series which aired in 1995 and 1996

== See also ==
- Towheads (film), a 2013 American drama
- The Towheads, original name of Eisley, an American rock band
