= The Birth of New Zealand =

1922 film

- Directed by: Harrington Reynolds
- Starring: Stella Southern
- Production company: New Zealand Cinema Enterprises
- Release date: 1922
- Running time: 8,000 ft, 132 min.
- Country: New Zealand
- Language: silent

The Birth of New Zealand is a 1922 New Zealand film which depicts key events in New Zealand history. Directed by Harrington Reynolds who also starred, other New Zealand pioneer filmmakers Ted Coubray and possibly Rudall Hayward were also involved. Episodes depicted include ancient Maori wars, Captain Cook's landing and the signing of the Treaty of Waitangi.

== History ==
The silent film was shot around Howick and Cockle Bay over two months in 1921. The film premiered at the Auckland Town Hall on 11 February 1922.

Only fragments (154 feet) of the film remain. While not the first film shot in New Zealand, this is the earliest film of which footage remains. Scenes from this film were reused by filmmaker Edward T. Brown for the 1930 "talkie" The Romance of Maoriland.

== Cast ==
- Stella Southern as Dorothy
- Norman French as Tom Campbell
- Harrington Reynolds as Con O'Hara
- George Kingsland as Septimus
- Maisie Carter as Mrs Campbell
