= Dale Austen =

New Zealand actress

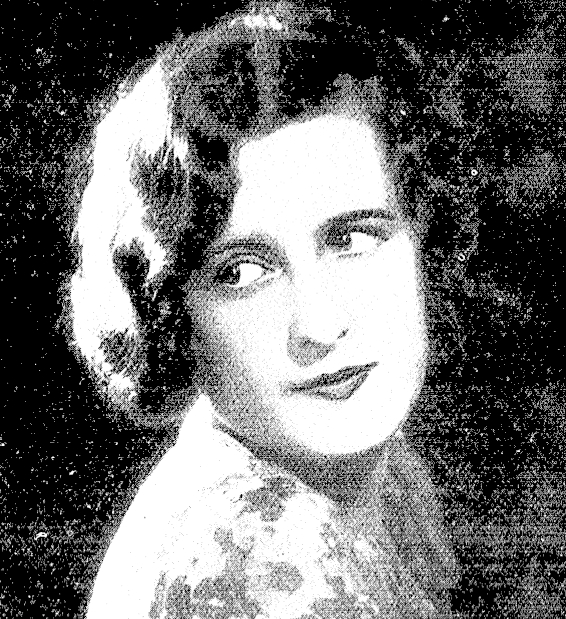
- Born: Beatrix Dale Austen; 12 September 1910; Dunedin, New Zealand
- Died: Unknown
- Years active: 1927–1933
- Known for: Acting and modeling

Dale Austen, born Beatrix Dale Austen (born 12 September 1910, date of death unknown), was a New Zealand actress who had a brief acting career in films in the late 1920s and the 1930s.

She was born in Dunedin, New Zealand on 12 September 1910. She was an accomplished athlete in yachting, swimming, tennis, basketball, horse-riding and dancing. Her height, age 17, was five feet and four inches.

At the age of 16 she was entered into a beauty contest organized by First National Pictures. On 14 July 1927 she defeated seven other girls to be crowned Miss Otago, garnering 4,447 votes out of a possible 10,664. This earned her a place in the Miss New Zealand contest. On 14 October 1927 she was crowned the second-ever winner of the title Miss New Zealand in Auckland. The major prize in this event was a trip to Hollywood and the opportunity to feature in films there.

Dale traveled by ship to Los Angeles, arriving in March 1928. She signed a contract with MGM Studios and then had screen tests at MGM on 15 March with actor James Murray.

She returned to New Zealand on 20 May 1928. She then toured for some weeks, appearing in cinemas to introduce a short documentary film titled Miss New Zealand in Movieland. On her return she stated that her first screen appearance had been a minor role in a movie called The Actress, which starred Norma Shearer. She also claimed other small parts in films: Diamond Handcuffs (with Conrad Nagle, Lena Malena and Gwen Lee), Loves of Louie, Polly Preferred and Detectives (with Polly Moran and Marceline Day. Her only credited role during this time was playing the hero's girlfriend in Chet Withey's The Bushranger, a Hollywood drama set in Australia in the early years of European settlement.

She subsequently had dual roles as mother and daughter in a New Zealand silent film called The Bush Cinderella, directed by Rudall Hayward.

She subsequently moved to Australia, where she married Auckland-born Robert Ivan Nicholson of Sydney on 18 October 1933.
