= The Romance of Maoriland =

Unreleased 1930 New Zealand film

- Directed by: Edward T. Brown
- Written by: Edward T. Brown
- Produced by: Edward T. Brown
- Starring: Patch Mason; Tom Campbell; Stella Southern
- Cinematography: Ted Coubray
- Release date: 1936
- Language: English

The Romance of Maoriland was a 1930 New Zealand film, intended to be New Zealand's first "talkie" film with Ted Coubray’s Coubraytone sound system, though also having intertitles. The film was registered with the Chief Censor on 14 August 1930, but was never released.

Producer, director and script writer Edward T. Brown had purchased some footage from the 1923 film The Birth of New Zealand. Several episodes included pre-European culture, the signing of the Treaty of Waitangi and a robbery and kidnapping in the Gabriel's Gully goldfields. The holdup of a Cobb & Co coach incorporated stock Western clichés according to Sam Edwards; masked robbers, the driver holding his hands high and jewellery ripped from women passengers.

== Cast ==
The cast included Patch Mason, Tom Campbell and apparently Stella Southern as the mother of a boy passenger kidnapped during the holdup episode.
