= Witarina Harris =

New Zealand film actor and Māori advocate (1906–2007)

Witarina Harris QSM
- Born: Witarina Te Miriarangi Parewahaika Mitchell; 15 May 1906; Ohinemutu, Rotorua, New Zealand
- Died: 10 June 2007 (aged 101); Rotorua, New Zealand
- Burial place: Kauae Cemetery, Ngongotahā
- Occupations: Entertainer, film actress, language advocate, public servant
- Notable work: Under the Southern Cross
- Spouse: Howard Reginald Harris (m. 1932; died 1979)
- Children: 5
- Relatives: Rotohiko Tangonui Haupapa (grandfather)

Witarina Te Miriarangi Parewahaika Harris QSM (née Mitchell; 15 May 1906 – 10 June 2007) was a New Zealand film actress, Māori language advocate, entertainer and public servant. She featured in the 1929 Universal Pictures silent film Under the Southern Cross as the heroine Princess Miro in her only film credit.

Harris worked for politician Āpirana Ngata as a secretary and helped to establish Wellington's Ngāti Pōneke Young Maori Club as a recreational and educational club for Māori people and the Māori Women's Welfare League. Late in her life, she promoted Māori cinema around the world and a documentary and film about her were broadcast.

== Biography ==
She was born Witarina Te Miriarangi Parewahaika Mitchell on 15 May 1906 in Ohinemutu, Rotorua. Her mother, Nataria Haupapa, was from the Māori hapū (tribe) Ngāti Whakaue, and a person of mana in that tribe. Harris' father, James Niramona Zealand Mitchell, was a surveyor of Ngāti Te Takinga, Ngāti Pikiao and Scottish descent. Her grandfather Rotohiko Tangonui Haupapa served on Rotorua's town board and the Pukeroa Hill Trustees Board. The family resided close to the Te Papaiouru Marae, in Ohinemutu with her maternal stepfather and Rangiriri Manaki Te Kaiamo. At home, she spoke Māori, which she was caned for doing so at a catholic school in Rotorua. Harris was trained in shorthand and typing and then found work at the Maori Arts and Crafts School after a recommendation from a family friend and politician Āpirana Ngata.

Ngata suggested to Harris in the late 1920s that the latter audition for a role in the Universal Pictures silent film Under the Southern Cross (also called The Devil's Pit) that was filmed in the Bay of Plenty. She was cast as Princess Miro because the studio wanted a person to complement the vibrant local surroundings, and she filmed at White Island. The film was her only feature role. It was commercially successful and Harris attended its premiere at the Embassy Theatre, Wellington; it was later lost until a copy was discovered by actor Jonathan Dennis and he donated to the New Zealand Film Archive. Afterwards, she was part of the "silent migration" of Māori from rural areas to the cities to seek a job. She recalled the experience: "Coming from Rotorua, we were used to mixing with the Pākehā people. So when I came to Wellington and felt so lonely it was a surprise to me. This thing sort of built up within me – I thought, “I want to see a Māori face!"

Harris was chosen by Ngata to become his secretary in Wellington in 1929 and she remained in the role for three years. She used the post to communicate in Māori both in verbal and written communication. In 1937, Harris assisted young and elderly individuals in the establishment of Wellington's Ngāti Poneke Young Maori Club as a recreational and educational club for Māori people to gather and interact. She was a soloist with the club's entertainment section during and after the Second World War; Harris also performed on the album Ko Ngati Poneke Hoki Matou in the 1930s. She also focused on improving the Māori through various organisations throughout the 1950s. Harris was a founding member of the Māori Women's Welfare League, who in 1979, named her as Te Whaea o te Motu, was a supporter of the māori language revival and worked with Matua Whangai to assist imprisoned Māori women.

She returned her tūrangawaewae in Ohinemutu, Rotorua in 1979 and became Te Arawa kuia. Harris was involved in several Māori organisations, volunteered as a tipi-haere kuia in pre-schools for Āwhina Whānau Services, helped to further promote the Māori language as well as guiding Tikanga Māori in various occasions for the Ngāti Whanaunga, got involved in the Mother's League and women's bowling and church groups and recorded for 2YA. She became close to Jonathan Dennis in 1982 and influenced him by helping to make a European-style become more Māori-orientated in its practice and protocol. In 1987, Harris was featured in a television documentary called Ngā Pikitia Māori and she also attended screenings and exhibitions of Māori films around the world in various locations from 1986 to 1990 to promote the industry.

She visited Italy in 1993 as a guest at the Pordenone Silent Film Festival, to provide context of tangata whenua, which had been interpreted as "merely ethnographic images of an exotic people of long ago." Harris was appointed a cultural ambassador for one year in 1997. and an oral history was collected on her for a book. A film on her and Dennis' friendship was directed by Peter Wells and premiered at the New Zealand International Film Festival in 2004 and a documentary on her was broadcast on Māori Television three years later. Harris was presented with the Taiki Ngapara lifetime achievement award by the New Zealand Film Archive in December 2006.

== Private life ==
On 18 June 1932, she married the Englishman Howard Reginald Harris in Wellington. They had five children. In the 1986 Queen's Birthday Honours, Harris was awarded the Queen's Service Medal for community service. She died in Rotorua Hospital on 10 June 2007. At the time of her death, Harris was the oldest living film actress in New Zealand. The Māori Party paid tribute to her. She was buried in the Kauae Cemetery, Ngongotahā.

== Personality and legacy ==
According to Emma Jean Kelly of the Dictionary of New Zealand Biography, Harris modelled awhi and manaakitanga in her later years to assist the young in strengthening their māoritanga. She was close to her family and was willing to share her experiences with others. In January 2009, a gold-framed oil portrait of Harris produced by Māori collector Peter Jean Caley and commissioned by the entertainer Howard Morrison was unveiled at the chambers of the Rotorua Lakes Council.
