= Lee Hill (cinematographer) =

New Zealand cinematographer and photographer (1907–1952)

Lee M. Hill full name Leighton McLeod Hill (13 March 1907 – 5 June 1952) was a New Zealand film-maker and cinematographer. He was born in Carterton, attended Carterton School and Dannevirke High School, and died in Wellington.

== Career ==
Hill worked for J. S. Vinsen for ten years and as a freelance. He also worked with Rudall Hayward in the 1920s, making local "community comedies", but later made some himself in competition with Hayward e.g. Frances of Fielding.

Hill was an Army photographer in the 2NZEF in World War II. He was captured at Sidi Aziz in 1941 and spent several years as a German prisoner-of-war. Towards the end of the war he was in Oflag IX A/Z at Rotenburg an der Fulda, where he showed German silent films to prisoners. When the camp was marched east in 1945, he took a series of photographs of the march. Examples of these are in the Turnbull Collection, New Zealand.

After the war, Hill was associated with Apex Films Ltd and his own Television Films Ltd. He took over the Vogue Theatre in Brooklyn, Wellington, but died suddenly, leaving a wife and family.

In an interview about the filming of Down on the Farm, Phar Lap's Son and The Wagon and the Star, Ronald Sinclair said: "It was Lee Hill that all of us relied on for guiding us in the production. He came to New Zealand from Hollywood, with a Hollywood background to put to use. Such background was considered vital, and Hill was highly revered by all of us because of the experience he brought with him."

== Filmography (partial) ==
- The Bush Cinderella (1928) General assistant
- Down on the Farm (1935) Director of photography (New Zealand's first "talkie")
- Phar Lap's Son (1935) Technical advisor
- The Wagon and the Star (1936) Casting
