= Te Pairi Tūterangi =

Tuhoe leader, tohunga, orator, carver, weaver

Te Pairi Tūterangi (?–1954) was a notable New Zealand tribal leader, tohunga, orator, carver and weaver. Of Māori descent, he identified with the Tuhoe iwi. He was born in Maungapohatu, Bay of Plenty, New Zealand. Some of his most well known carvings include the meeting houses at Te Maungaroa and Whakarae in the Waimana Valley, and at Ōmuriwaka.

Tūterangi played Te Kooti in the 1927 film The Te Kooti Trail.
