= Phar Lap's Son =

- Directed by: A. L. Lewis
- Cinematography: Lee Hill
- Production company: South Seas Films
- Release date: 1936
- Country: New Zealand
- Language: English

Phar Lap's Son is a 1936 New Zealand film directed by A. L. Lewis. Only part of it survives. It was shot in and around Dunedin.

Many of the crew who worked on it had worked on Down on the Farm (1935).

== Critical reception ==
Lionel Collier, for the British magazine, Picturegoer, gave a very negative review and wrote "Coming all the way from Hollywood, Dr. A. L. Lewis directed this racing comedy in New Zealand. He wasted his time. It is a singularly unfunny affair and very definitely boring. Technical qualities are exceedingly poor and the dialogue excruciatingly bad. The only redeeming features about it are a few glimpses of New Zealand scenery."

== See also ==
- List of films about horses
- List of films set or shot in Dunedin
