= Derek Cianfrance =

American filmmaker (born 1974)

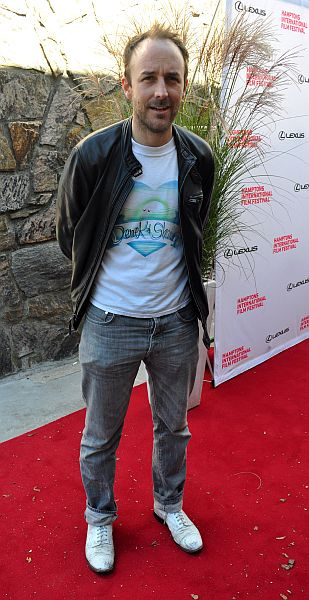
- Cianfrance at the screening of Blue Valentine during the 18th Annual Hamptons Film Festival
- Born: Derek M. Cianfrance; 23 January 1974 (age 52); Lakewood, Colorado, U.S.
- Education: University of Colorado Boulder
- Occupations: Film director, screenwriter
- Years active: 1998–present
- Spouse: Shannon Plumb
- Children: 2

Derek M. Cianfrance (/ˈsiːənfræns/; born January 23, 1974) is an American film director, cinematographer, screenwriter, and editor. He is best known for writing and directing the films Blue Valentine (2010), The Place Beyond the Pines (2012), The Light Between Oceans (2017) and Roofman (2025) as well as the HBO miniseries I Know This Much Is True (2020). For his contributions to the story of Sound of Metal (2019), he received a nomination for the Academy Award for Best Original Screenplay with its director Darius Marder and Abraham Marder.

== Early life and education ==
Cianfrance grew up in Lakewood, Colorado, and graduated from Green Mountain High School, and then attended the University of Colorado Boulder, studying film production under avant-garde filmmakers Stan Brakhage and Phil Solomon.

== Career ==
=== 1998–2017: Breakthrough and acclaim ===
At 23, he wrote, directed, and edited his first feature film, Brother Tied, which premiered and was awarded at the International Filmfestival Mannheim-Heidelberg and was well received at festivals including Sundance. However, the movie couldn't be sold because of music rights‒the James Brown songs used in the film were too expensive for distributors to pay for as part of acquisition. Cianfrance followed this up by working as cinematographer for the film Quattro Noza (also known as Streets of Legend).

His second feature, Blue Valentine, starred Ryan Gosling and Michelle Williams. The two actors became familiar with their roles several years before filming but never met in person. The project was originally slated to shoot in California, but Cianfrance relocated to Brooklyn so that Williams could be with her daughter. There were no rehearsals and Cianfrance rarely shot more than one take per shot. The film was originally given an NC-17 rating, despite having little nudity and no violence. It has since been changed to an R-rating after an appeal was filed by The Weinstein Company.

Blue Valentine star Gosling worked with Cianfrance again on The Place Beyond the Pines (2013), which followed a motorcycle stunt rider (Gosling) who becomes a bank robber to support his newborn son. Bradley Cooper also stars in the film. Principal photography was done in the summer of 2011. Location filming was done in upstate New York – Schenectady, Niskayuna, and Glenville areas in 2011. Next, Cianfrance wrote and directed The Light Between Oceans (2016) a romantic drama based on the 2012 novel of the same name by M. L. Stedman. An international co-production between the United States, Australia, the United Kingdom, and New Zealand, the film stars Michael Fassbender, Alicia Vikander, Rachel Weisz, Bryan Brown, and Jack Thompson. The film tells the story of a lighthouse keeper and his wife who rescue and adopt an infant girl adrift at sea. Years later, the couple discover the child's true parentage and are faced with the moral dilemma of their actions.

=== 2020–present: Television work ===
Since the early 2010s, Cianfrance had been working on a fictional documentary called Metalhead, which centered on a metal drummer who becomes deaf. The film featured the members of the band Jucifer portraying themselves. The project was developed for years with Cianfrance eventually passing the reins over to his friend and The Place Beyond the Pines co-writer Darius Marder resulting in Sound of Metal (2019). Starring Riz Ahmed, the film premiered at the 2019 Toronto International Film Festival and was released by Amazon Studios in 2020. Cianfrance, Marder, and his brother Abraham Marder, received an Academy Award for Best Original Screenplay nomination for the film.

Cianfrance wrote and directed the HBO miniseries I Know This Much Is True, an adaptation of Wally Lamb's novel of the same name. The series premiered in spring 2020.

In October 2021, he was set to write and direct Wolfman, replacing Leigh Whannell as director, along with screenwriters Rebecca Angelo and Lauren Shuker Blum. The film tapped Gosling to star, marking their third collaboration. In December 2023, Cianfrance and Gosling were reported to have exited the project, with Whannell returning to directing duties and Christopher Abbott replacing Gosling in the lead role.

Cianfrance is also known for his TV documentary work, which includes portraits of musicians Sean Combs and Run DMC and the Battleground basketball series. He is currently working on a television series called Muscle, for HBO, which he says will be a comedy series with a unique take on "character development."

== Personal life ==
Cianfrance is married to actress and film director Shannon Plumb. Together, they have two children.

== Filmography ==
=== Film ===
Year	Title	Director	Writer	Notes
1998	Brother Tied	Yes	Yes	Also cinematographer and editor; never commercially released
2010	Blue Valentine	Yes	Yes	
2012	The Place Beyond the Pines	Yes	Yes	
2016	The Light Between Oceans	Yes	Yes	
2020	Sound of Metal	No	Story	
2025	Roofman	Yes	Yes	

=== Television ===
Year	Title	Director	Writer	Executive Producer	Notes
2020	I Know This Much Is True	Yes	Yes	Executive	Miniseries

=== Documentary ===
Year	Title	Notes
2002	Run-D.M.C. and Jam Master Jay: The Last Interview	Also cinematographer
2004	Battlegrounds: King of the World	
2005	Battlegrounds: King of the Court	
2006	Black and White: A Portrait of Sean Combs	TV movie
2008	The Power of Dreams - Dream the Impossible	
2021	His Name Is Ray	as Executive Producer

Actor

- Towheads (2013) (as "Matt")

== Awards and nominations ==
Year	Association	Category	Title	Result
2020	Academy Award	Best Original Screenplay	Sound of Metal	Nominated
2016	Directors Guild of America	Outstanding Directing – Commercials	Nike Golf's "Chase", Squarespace's "Manifesto"; Powerade's "Doubts" and "Expectations"	Won
2003	Independent Spirit Award	Best Cinematography	Streets of Legend	Nominated
2003	Sundance Film Festival	Cinematography Prize	Streets of Legend	Won
2010	Sundance Film Festival	Grand Jury Prize	Blue Valentine	Nominated
2016	Venice International Film Festival	Golden Lion	The Light Between Oceans	Nominated
2020	Writers Guild of America	Best Original Screenplay	Sound of Metal	Nominated
