= Lora Lee Gayer =

American stage actress (born 1988)

- Born: Lorraine Lee Gayer; April 27, 1988 (age 38); New York City, New York, U.S.
- Education: Carnegie Mellon University (BFA, 2010)
- Occupations: Actor; dancer; singer
- Years active: 2011–present
- Spouse: Eric Jaffe (2022-present)

Lora Lee Gayer (born Lorraine Lee Gayer; April 27, 1988) is an American stage actress. On Broadway, she originated the lead role of Linda Mason in Holiday Inn in 2016. She appeared on Broadway in the 2011 revival of Follies as Young Sally.

== Early life and education ==
Gayer was born in New York City to Thomas and Cynthia (née Dray) Gayer and was raised in Naples, Florida. She has one younger brother, Thomas Gayer the Fourth. Her parents were jointly involved in the fashion industry. As a young child, she was initially interested in more visual arts, though she later transferred to performance. She sang with the Naples Philharmonic Youth Chorale at age 11, and began attending the Interlochen Center for the Arts (Michigan) summer program at the age of thirteen. Three years later, she began her full-time education with Interlochen's prep school.

Gayer attended the Carnegie Mellon School of Drama in Pittsburgh, graduating with a major in musical theater. Immediately after college, Gayer moved back to New York and began looking for performing work.

== Career ==
In 2006, Gayer attended the YoungArts program in Miami, where she was among the students featured in the documentary short Rehearsing a Dream.

Gayer made her Broadway debut in the revival of Follies as Young Sally. She had played the role at the premiere of the production at the Kennedy Center. The production ran on Broadway from September 12, 2011 to January 22, 2012. She performed in the production at the Ahmanson Theatre, Los Angeles, in May to June 2012.

In 2013, she made her film debut playing Lily in Towheads, which was released on March 27 of that year.

She performed as Philia in Shakespeare Theatre Company's (Washington, DC) production of A Funny Thing Happened on the Way to the Forum, which ran from November 21, 2013 to January 5, 2014. For the performance, she was nominated for the Helen Hayes Award for Outstanding Supporting Actress, Resident Musical.

She returned to Broadway in March 2015 (previews), where she originated the role of Tonia Gromeko in the musical Doctor Zhivago. The musical closed on May 10, 2015, running for only 26 previews and 23 official performances.

That same year, Gayer performed as part of Cdza in a segment on CollegeHumor's Comedy Music Hall of Fame.

She appeared in the original Broadway cast of the Roundabout Theatre production of Holiday Inn, playing the principal role of Linda Mason. The musical is based on the musical film of the same name, with music written by Irving Berlin. The musical opened on October 6, 2016 and ran to January 15, 2017.

In January 2019, Gayer performed "The Interview" as part of "The Pussy Grabber Plays" at Joe's Pub at The Public Theater in New York City. The song was co-written by Natasha Stoynoff, one of the women who accused Donald Trump of sexual misconduct before the 2016 election.

== Awards and nominations ==
Year	Award	Category	Nominated work	Result	Ref.
2014	Helen Hayes Award	Outstanding Supporting Actress, Resident Musical	A Funny Thing Happened on the Way to the Forum	Nominated	
2017	Chita Rivera Awards for Dance and Choreography	Outstanding Female Dancer in a Broadway Show	Holiday Inn	Nominated	
