= The Bloke from Freeman's Bay =

1920 New Zealand short comedy film

- Directed by: Rudall Hayward
- Written by: Rudall Hayward
- Produced by: Rudall Hayward
- Starring: George Forde
- Cinematography: Rudall Hayward
- Edited by: Rudall Hayward
- Release date: 1920
- Running time: (2 reels)
- Country: New Zealand
- Languages: Silent; English intertitles
- Budget: £500

The Bloke from Freeman's Bay is a 1920 New Zealand silent short comedy which was the first film from Rudall Hayward.

Rudall's two-reel comedy was shot on location in the suburb of Freemans Bay, Auckland.

== Cast ==
- George Forde as The Bloke

== Reception ==
The film was screened in family-owned cinemas attracting a full house on its opening night. Hayward's uncle Henry was unimpressed with the film and offered Rudall £50 to burn it. Hayward was prosecuted by the Auckland City Council in the Police Court and fined £1 on each of two charges for putting up posters for The Bloke from Freeman’s Bay in unauthorised places contrary to city by-laws, in October 1921.
