= The Light Between Oceans (film) =

2016 romantic drama film by Derek Cianfrance

- Theatrical release poster
- Directed by: Derek Cianfrance
- Screenplay by: Derek Cianfrance
- Based on: The Light Between Oceans by M. L. Stedman
- Produced by: David Heyman; Jeffrey Clifford
- Starring: Michael Fassbender; Alicia Vikander; Rachel Weisz; Bryan Brown; Jack Thompson
- Cinematography: Adam Arkapaw
- Edited by: Jim Helton; Ron Patane
- Music by: Alexandre Desplat
- Production companies: DreamWorks Pictures; Reliance Entertainment; Participant Media; Heyday Films
- Distributed by: Walt Disney Studios Motion Pictures (Note: Distributed by Walt Disney Studios Motion Pictures through the Touchstone Pictures banner.) (North America); Entertainment One Films (United Kingdom, Australia and New Zealand); Reliance Entertainment (India)
- Release dates: September 1, 2016 (Venice); September 2, 2016 (United States); November 1, 2016 (United Kingdom)
- Running time: 132 minutes
- Countries: United Kingdom; United States
- Language: English
- Budget: $20 million
- Box office: $26 million

The Light Between Oceans is a 2016 romantic drama film written and directed by Derek Cianfrance and based on the 2012 novel by M. L. Stedman. An international co-production between the United Kingdom, the United States, India and Canada, the film stars Michael Fassbender, Alicia Vikander, Rachel Weisz, Bryan Brown, and Jack Thompson. The film tells the story of a lighthouse keeper and his wife who rescue an infant girl adrift at sea and raise her as their own. Years later, the couple discover the child's true parentage and are faced with the consequences of their actions.

The Light Between Oceans had its world premiere at the 73rd Venice International Film Festival on September 1, 2016, where it competed for the Golden Lion. The film was released by Touchstone Pictures in North America on September 2, 2016, being the last DreamWorks Pictures film distributed by Walt Disney Studios Motion Pictures through their 2011 output deal. The film was released in the United Kingdom on November 1, 2016, by Entertainment One Films. It received mixed reviews and grossed $26 million worldwide. It was also the final film to be released by Touchstone Pictures before it went defunct on the same day as its North American release.

== Plot ==
In December 1918, Tom Sherbourne – a traumatised and withdrawn hero of World War I – is hired as a lightkeeper at Janus Rock, a lighthouse off the coast of Australia. He falls in love with a local girl, Isabel Graysmark, and they marry. Isabel suffers two miscarriages in two years and fears she may never become a mother.

Shortly after Isabel's second miscarriage, a rowboat containing a dead man and a newborn baby girl washes ashore near the lighthouse. Tom knows that he is required by law to report the discovery. However, Isabel fears that the baby will almost certainly be sent to an orphanage and persuades Tom to pass the baby off as their own daughter, to which he reluctantly agrees. He buries the man on the island, and the couple names the infant girl Lucy.

As Tom and Isabel are about to have Lucy christened on the mainland, Tom sees a woman, Hannah Roennfeldt, kneeling in front of a grave bearing the names of Franz Johannes Roennfeldt and his baby daughter Grace Ellen, who were lost at sea on the day they found Lucy, 27 April 1926. Tom fears that Lucy may very well be Hannah's missing infant daughter. He writes anonymously to Hannah to tell her that her husband is dead but that her infant daughter is safe, loved and well cared for.

Four years later, Tom, Isabel and young Lucy, enjoying an idyllic life together, attend a ceremony for the anniversary of Tom's lighthouse. They strike up a conversation with Hannah and her sister, Gwendolyn Potts, and learn that Franz was a German, that Hannah's marrying him so soon after the First World War was controversial, and that he had been accosted in the street by a drunken crowd. Franz jumped into a rowboat and fled with his baby daughter.

Tormented by his conscience, Tom sends Hannah a small silver rattle that was found with Lucy on the boat. One of Tom's co-workers recognizes the rattle on a reward poster and reports him to the police. Accused of murdering Franz, Tom takes full responsibility, claiming he bullied Isabel into complying. Isabel is enraged that Tom is willing to give Lucy away and breaks off contact with him after his arrest. The police are unable to obtain an answer from the distraught Isabel as to whether or not Franz was dead when they discovered him.

Lucy is returned to her biological family but initially rejects and hates them, due to having no memory of them whatsoever. She refuses to answer to her given name. Lucy runs away in an effort to return to the Lighthouse and her "real parents", and a search team is sent to rescue her. She is found and returned to Hannah, but the events lead Hannah to realize that Lucy really belongs to Isabel.

Hannah promises to return Lucy to Isabel as soon as Isabel testifies against Tom. Just as Tom is about to be taken by boat to Albany for trial, Isabel reads a letter which Tom had sent her, saying he had not deserved his happiness with Lucy and how carrying the blame will assuage his guilt for surviving the war.

Isabel jumps on the boat and confesses everything. Moved by their gesture and reminded by Franz's words to always forgive others, Hannah offers to speak on their behalf at trial. Lucy has at last begun to bond with her biological mother and maternal grandfather, who agrees to call her "Lucy Grace" as a compromise.

In 1950, 27-year-old Lucy Grace Rutherford, accompanied by her baby son Christopher, tracks Tom down. She has not been in contact with the Sherbournes for over eighteen years, as they had agreed not to contact her for the rest of her girlhood. Isabel has recently died, still tormented with guilt for her actions, and Tom gives Lucy Grace a letter that her adoptive mother had written in case Lucy ever made contact. An emotionally sorrowful Lucy Grace thanks Tom, the only father she ever knew, for rescuing and raising her for the four years of her life on Janus Rock, and she asks if she can visit again. She and Tom embrace before she leaves. Tom sits on his rocking chair, now content with what life had given him.

== Cast ==
- Michael Fassbender as Thomas "Tom" Sherbourne
- Alicia Vikander as Isabel Graysmark Sherbourne
- Rachel Weisz as Hannah Potts Roennfeldt
- Bryan Brown as Septimus Potts
- Jack Thompson as Ralph Addicott
- Caren Pistorius as Lucy Grace Rutherford (Adult Lucy Grace)
  - Florence Clery as 4-year-old Lucy Sherbourne/Grace Roennfeldt
  - Georgie Jean Gascoigne as 1-year-old Lucy Grace Sherbourne
  - Elliot and Evangeline Newbery as an Infant
  - Christine Foote as a Toddler
- Anthony Hayes as Vernon Knuckey
- Emily Barclay as Gwendolyn "Gwen" Potts
- Leon Ford as Franz Johannes Roennfeldt
- Thomas Unger as Bluey
- Benedict Hardie as Harry Garstone
- Jane Menelaus as Violet Graysmark
- Garry McDonald as William "Bill" Graysmark
- Marshall Napier as Mr Couglan

== Production ==
=== Development and casting ===
DreamWorks acquired the rights to the novel on November 27, 2012, with David Heyman and Jeffrey Clifford producing through Heyday Films. DreamWorks approached Derek Cianfrance at the behest of Steven Spielberg, who was impressed by Cianfrance's Blue Valentine. In September 2013, Cianfrance was announced to direct the film. In May 2014, Michael Fassbender was announced in the film. In June 2014, Alicia Vikander joined the cast of the film, followed by Rachel Weisz in July 2014. Participant Media joined the production in August 2014.

=== Filming ===
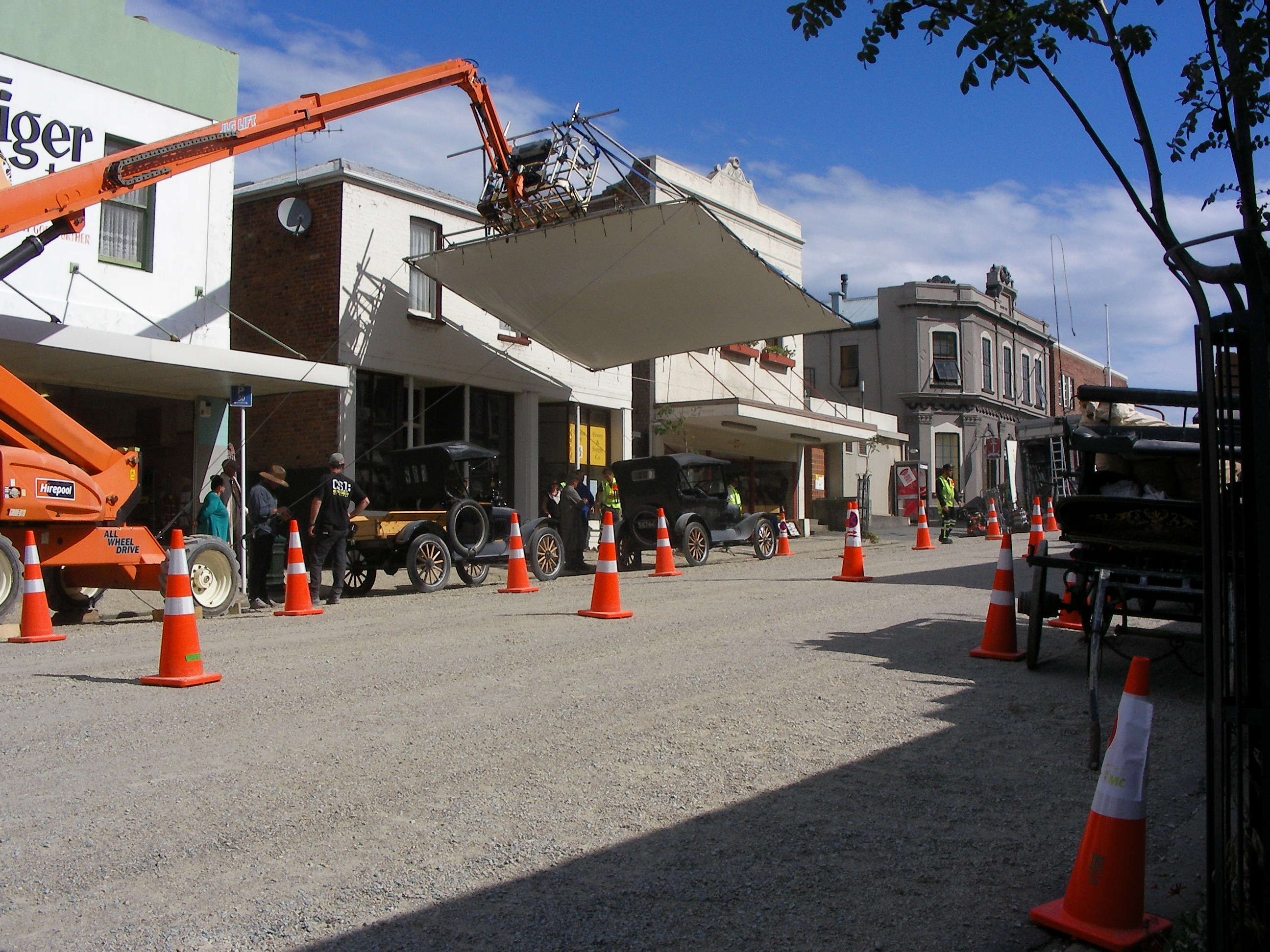
Filming location, George Street, Port Chalmers, New Zealand

Principal photography started in September 2014, with filming locations in New Zealand and Australia. Filming took place in Dunedin, Port Chalmers and on the Otago Peninsula, Saint Bathans in Central Otago and at the Cape Campbell Lighthouse in Marlborough. Filming sites included the former Dunedin Prison in Dunedin and Stuart Street at the former King Edward Technical College building.

Footage aboard a steam train was filmed in October inside a refurbished wooden "bird cage" passenger carriage from the Pleasant Point Railway in South Canterbury. Mainline Steam Heritage Trust used Ja 1240 "Jessica" for the movie and it was transferred from the trust's Christchurch depot to Dunedin for filming to take place. While the scene in which the locomotive is used was set in 1918, locomotive Ja 1240 was built in 1947 and was the second New Zealand Railways JA class locomotive to be built. Built at New Zealand Railways Hillside workshops in Dunedin it ran exclusively in the South Island of New Zealand from 1947 until 1971.

In November the production moved to Australia and filming began in Stanley, Tasmania where the crews transformed some locations in the town including the pier, which was refurbished, and the road, which was covered in gravel. Production wrapped on November 24, 2014.

=== Post-production ===
Cianfrance spent a year editing the film, with little breaks in between with the first cut of the film ending up at 2 hours and 20 minutes.

== Release ==
The Light Between Oceans held its world premiere at the 73rd Venice International Film Festival on September 1, 2016. The film was distributed by Walt Disney Studios Motion Pictures through the Touchstone Pictures banner, being the last DreamWorks film to be released under the original agreement with Walt Disney Studios, as well as the final film released by Touchstone before it became defunct. Disney released the film in the United States on September 2, 2016. Disney opted not to give the film a limited release, a method often used by studios for adult dramas, and instead issued the film in general wide release at 1,500 locations with focus on upscale venues.

Distribution was handled by Mister Smith Entertainment through other third-party film distributors in all other regions except for India; Entertainment One in the United Kingdom, and Australia, Arthouse in Russia, Golden Scene in Hong Kong and Phantom Film in Japan. Reliance Entertainment released the film in India.

The Light Between Oceans was released by Touchstone Home Entertainment on Blu-ray, DVD, and digital download on January 24, 2017. It was also released by Entertainment One through 20th Century Fox Home Entertainment on Blu-ray and DVD in the UK on March 13, 2017.

== Reception ==
=== Box office ===
The Light Between Oceans grossed $12.5 million in North America and $13.3 million in other territories for a worldwide total of $26 million, against a budget of $20 million.

In the United States, the film was released on September 2, 2016, alongside Morgan, and was projected to gross $6–9 million from around 1,500 theaters in its opening weekend. It grossed $1.4 million on its first day and $4.8 million in its opening weekend, finishing 6th at the box office.

=== Critical response ===
The Light Between Oceans received mixed reviews from critics. On the review aggregation website Rotten Tomatoes, the film has an approval rating of 62%, based on 235 reviews, with an average rating of 6.2/10. The website's critical consensus reads, "The Light Between Oceans presents a well-acted and handsomely mounted adaptation of its bestselling source material, but ultimately tugs on the heartstrings too often to be effective." On Metacritic, the film has an average score of 60 out of 100, based on 44 critics, indicating "mixed or average reviews". Audiences polled by CinemaScore gave the film an average grade of "B+", on an A+ to F scale.

Justin Chang of the Los Angeles Times wrote: "The actors hurl themselves into their roles with sufficient commitment and feeling that you believe in Tom and Isabel completely, even when the creaky narrative machinery around them begins to trigger your skepticism." Owen Gleiberman of Variety said it "winds up taking one too many self-serious twists and turns. The film earns its darkness, but it might have been even more affecting if it didn’t shrink from the light." Richard Roeper of the Chicago Sun-Times called it "A gorgeous but plodding and borderline ludicrous period-piece weeper."
