= Stella Southern =

Australian actress

Stella Southern was an Australian actress best known for her performances in the silent films A Girl of the Bush (1921) and The Bushwhackers (1925).

Originally from Sydney, she was working for a milliner when discovered by Beaumont Smith who cast her in The Man from Snowy River (1920). He let her select her own stage name (her real name was Lucy Emma "Billie" Winks) and she chose "Stella Southern" which means "star of the south".

On 4 October 1921 she married New Zealand film director Harrington Reynolds in Auckland; she had starred for him in The Birth of New Zealand (1921). She also appeared in a number of productions on stage in Brisbane.

== Select credits ==
- The Man from Snowy River (1920) – film
- The Betrayer (1921) – film
- A Girl of the Bush (1921) – film
- The Birth of New Zealand (1921) – film
- A Rough Passage (1922) – film
- Potash and Perlnutter (1922) – play, Theatre Royal, Brisbane
- The Passing of the Third Floor Back (1923) – play, Theatre Royal, Brisbane
- The Bachelor's Honeymoon (1923) – play, Theatre Royal, Brisbane
- Penelope by Somerset Maugham (1924) – play, His Majesty's, Brisbane
- Mrs Dot (1924) – play, His Majesty's Brisbane
- Twelfth Night by William Shakespeare (1924) – play, Brisbane
- The Bushwhackers (1925) – film
- Odds On (1928) – film
