= The Light Between Oceans =

2012 novel by M. L. Stedman

- Hardcover edition
- Author: M. L. Stedman
- Language: English
- Genre: Historical fiction
- Published: March 20, 2012
- Publisher: Vintage Australia
- Publication place: Australia
- Pages: 362 pp.
- Awards: 2013 Australian Indie Book Award
- ISBN: 978-1742755717
- OCLC: 812988276

The Light Between Oceans is a 2012 Australian historical fiction novel by M. L. Stedman, her debut novel, published by Random House Australia on 20 March 2012. A film adaptation of the same name starring Alicia Vikander and Michael Fassbender was released on 2 September 2016.

== Summary ==
Thomas "Tom" Sherbourne returns home to Eastern Australia after fighting in the Western Front trenches of World War I with the First Australian Imperial Force. He left physically unscathed and with several decorations, but he suffers from nightmares and survivor guilt and seeks a quiet, remote job. Tom becomes the lighthouse keeper for Janus Rock, a small, isolated island southwest of Australia. He spends his last days on the mainland in Point Partageuse, during which he meets a young woman named Isabel Graysmark. He is struck by her innocence and cheeriness, in contrast to the general post-war gloom in the town. As Tom begins his shift on Janus Rock, he finds comfort in the regulated structure and simple life of a keeper. His only contact with the outside world is through Ralph and Bluey, who run the supply boat to Janus every three months. He begins to correspond with Isabel, and the two spend time together during Tom's leave periods on the mainland. They get married six months later, despite Tom's worries that she will struggle to adjust to life on Janus.

The couple are happy together on the island for some time; however, their efforts to have a child result in two miscarriages and a stillbirth, leaving them, especially Isabel, frustrated and on edge. Two weeks after the stillbirth, they are shocked when a dinghy washes up carrying a dead man and a living infant girl. Tom wants to report the incident, but Isabel convinces him that they should keep the child as a "gift from God" and act as though she were their own. They informally adopt her, and name her Lucy. Raising a child causes a transformation in Isabel, and she quickly becomes the caring mother she has long wanted to be. Lucy also uncovers a loving side of Tom that had been buried by the war and an abusive childhood.

When the Sherbourne family returns to Partageuse for the first time since Lucy's arrival, they introduce her to friends and family, and take her to be christened. Just before, they hear the story of Hannah Potts, a woman from a well-off local family, who married an Austrian, Frank Roennfeldt, which caused them to be ostracized by the town. On Anzac Day in 1926, a drunken mob harassed and chased them, causing Frank to flee on a boat with their infant daughter Grace, and they were never heard from again. Tom and Isabel realize that Lucy is Grace Roennfeldt, and Hannah is still grieving, thinking both Grace and Frank are dead. Isabel persuades Tom that they should still keep their secret in the interest of the child. Tom, however, secretly leaves Hannah an anonymous note saying that her daughter is alive and safe. Lucy continues to grow under the love of Isabel and Tom, although he still harbors reservations about the morality of what they have done.

Several years later, on another shore leave, he sends another anonymous package to Hannah, this one containing the rattle that Lucy had when she washed up. With this proof, Hannah's father increases the already-substantial reward he has offered for information about his granddaughter's whereabouts. Bluey recognizes the rattle from the lighthouse, and the reward money convinces him to report this to the police. Tom is taken into custody and Lucy is returned to Hannah, leaving Isabel stricken with grief. Tom vows to protect his wife by claiming that he was the one that insisted on keeping Lucy, because he believes he is responsible for her being taken away. Hannah had long fantasized about the loving reunion of mother and child, so she is devastated that her daughter—whom she continues to call Grace—completely rejects her and sees only Isabel as her mother. Isabel at first is furious at what she sees as Tom betraying her and refuses to cooperate with investigators, leading to some suspicion that he killed Frank and threatened Isabel into silence. She has a change of heart and realizes that Tom was acting in her best interests, and they tell the true story. Tom is released and Isabel receives a suspended sentence, and they settle together on a farm.

Lucy Grace, as she is now named, learns to love her biological family and does not cross paths with the Sherbournes until 1950. She visits after hearing that Isabel has been dying of cancer, but had already died one week earlier. Tom presents her with a box of girlhood memorabilia that his wife had saved. After she leaves, Tom finally feels content and at peace with his life.

== Reception ==
Sue Arnold writing for The Guardian called it "an extraordinary book" comparing the plot to Thomas Hardy's works. The Denver Post criticized the book as "somewhat predictable" but was positive on the work overall. The Sydney Morning Herald noted that it "is a work of such quality, insight and intrigue, it prompted an international bidding war among publishers", and called it "A remarkable, very readable, debut." Kirkus Reviews and Publishers Weekly both gave it starred reviews.

The Light Between Oceans won the 2013 Indie Book Awards Book of the Year and Debut Fiction Awards, made the 2013 longlist for the Miles Franklin Award, and the 2014 longlist of the International Dublin Literary Award.

== Film adaptation ==
The novel was developed into a feature film by DreamWorks, with David Heyman and Jeffrey Clifford producing. Derek Cianfrance directed the film, and Michael Fassbender, Alicia Vikander and Rachel Weisz starred in it. The film was released by Touchstone Pictures on 2 September 2016.

== See also ==
- List of films set or shot in Dunedin
