= List of films set or shot in Dunedin =

The following is an incomplete list of films set or shot primarily in Dunedin, New Zealand.

- Uproar (2023) (filmed and set in Dunedin)
- The Royal Treatment (2022) (partly filmed in Dunedin)
- The Power of the Dog (2021) (partly filmed in Dunedin)
- Black Christmas (2019) (partly filmed in Dunedin)
- The Baldlands (2015) (filmed and set in Dunedin)
- The Light Between Oceans (2014) (partly filmed in Dunedin and Port Chalmers)
- I Survived A Zombie Holocaust (2012) (filmed in Dunedin)
- Paradise at the End of the World (Out of Ashes) (2009) (filmed on Otago Peninsula, Dunedin)
- Piece of My Heart (1994) (filmed and set in Dunedin)
- X-Men Origins: Wolverine (partly filmed in Dunedin)
- Perfect Creature (2007) (filmed in Dunedin)
- Out of the Blue (2006) (set in Aramoana, Dunedin; filmed at Aramoana and Long Beach, Dunedin)
- Sylvia (2003) (filmed in Dunedin)
- Jaal: The Trap (2003) (partly filmed in Dunedin)
- Om Jai Jagadish (2002) (partly filmed in Dunedin)
- Scarfies (1999) (filmed and set in Dunedin)
- The Last Tattoo (1994) (partly filmed in Dunedin)
- The Grasscutter (1990) (filmed and set in Dunedin)
- An Angel at My Table (1990) (filmed and set partially in Dunedin)
- Pictures (1981) (filmed and set in Dunedin)
- Phar Lap's Son (1936) (filmed in Dunedin)
