= Auckland City Mission =

Charitable trust in New Zealand

- Auckland City Mission - Te Tāpui Atawhai
- Te Tāpui Atawhai

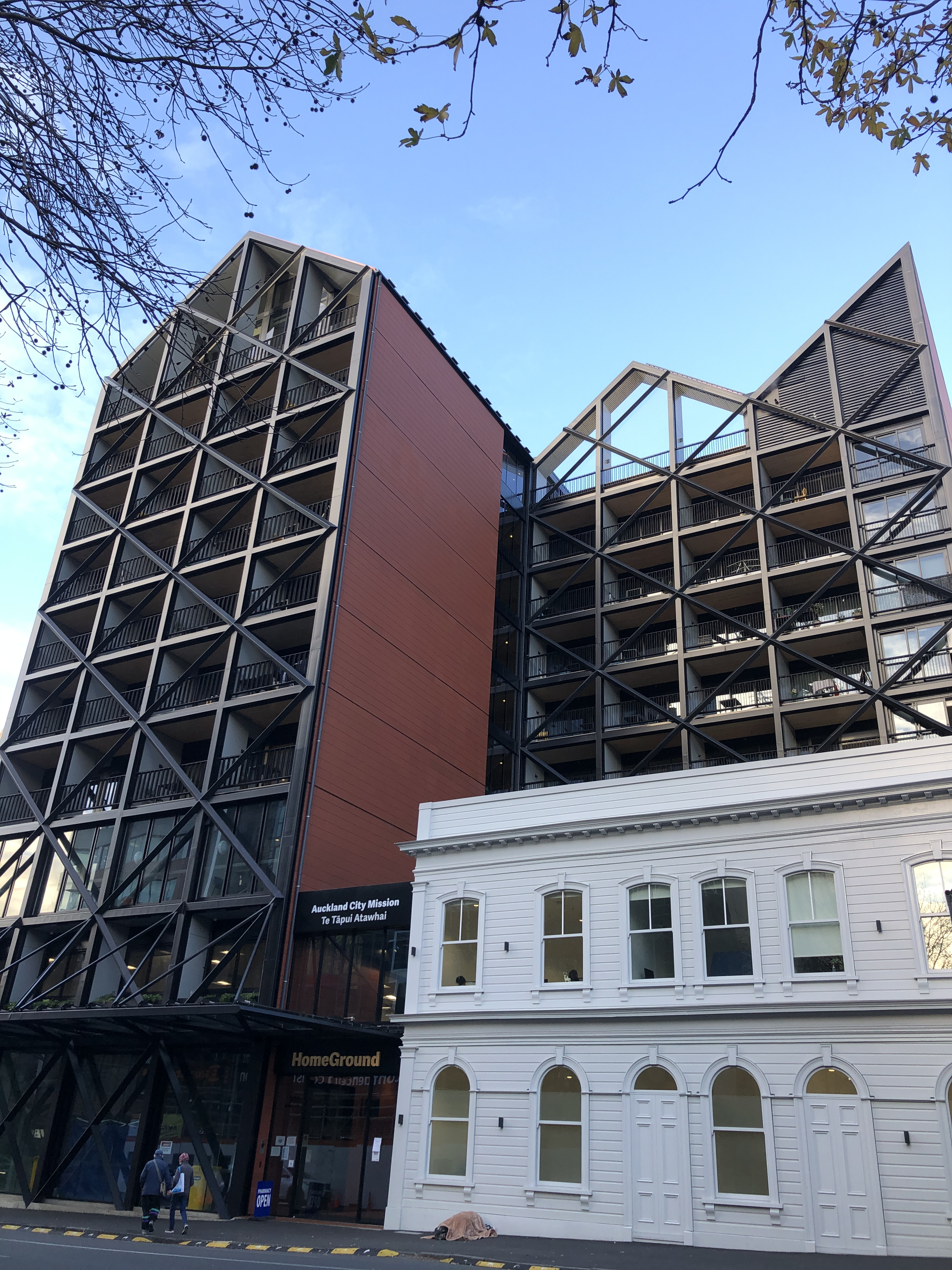
- HomeGround on Hobson Street, Auckland, 2022.
- Formation: 1920 (106 years ago)
- Founder: Jasper Calder
- Type: Charitable trust
- Tax ID no.: 010-007-771
- Registration no.: CC22938 (under Charities Act 2005)
- Purpose: Community housing, social services
- Headquarters: 140 Hobson Street, Auckland CBD
- Location: Auckland, New Zealand
- Region served: Auckland
- Services: Food bank; housing; health; research
- Revenue: 36 million NZD (2023)
- Expenses: 34 million NZD (2023)
- Volunteers: 2,527 (2025)
- Website: aucklandcitymission.org.nz

Auckland City Mission (Māori: Te Tāpui Atawhai) is a New Zealand-based charitable trust. It was established in 1920 in central Auckland, by then Auckland City Missioner Reverend Jasper Calder, as part of the Anglican Diocese of Auckland, and responds to poverty in the city, providing access to permanent and sustained housing, nutritious food, and physical and mental health services. Soon after its centenary in 2020, the Mission opened its purpose-built building called HomeGround.

== Origin and history ==
=== Jasper Calder ===
Rev'd Jasper Calder MBE (1885–1956) was born in Ponsonby, Auckland, the second son of Rev'd William Calder, an Anglican vicar and later Archdeacon of Auckland. He was educated at Ponsonby School and Auckland Grammar School, and studied at King's College, London, and St John's College, Auckland. He entered the Anglican ministry in 1910. Calder established the 'City Mission of the Anglican Church' (now the Auckland City Mission) at the end of the devastating World War I and Spanish flu epidemic, in 1920, and was Chair and Missioner for the next 26 years. The Mission's work increased into the Great Depression, and included a night shelter with a food kitchen, feeding hundreds of people every day, a medical clinic, children's health camps, and a second-hand clothing shop to help fund the other services. Calder said the Mission started "with no money, no rules but with an excellent committee, a lot of enthusiasm and a mighty big faith."

=== 1920s ===
Auckland Diocese formed the City Mission of the Anglican Church and an executive committee was established with Calder employed as chair. Calder was commissioned, then inducted at St Mary's pro-cathedral as City Missioner. Sunday services were held at theatres on Queen Street. An office was opened on Wellesley Street West, and clothing and financial assistance were provided to those in need. Two nurses were made available through the Mission. Funds were raised through a bazaar held in the Auckland Town Hall and Christmas appeals. Land was purchased in Papatoetoe for rehabilitating ex-prisoners and people with mental disorders. A night shelter was trialed in Federal Street. A chapel opened in the Wellesley Street offices and the offices later moved to Federal Street. A deputy missioner and organising secretary were appointed and the Mission was incorporated as a society. A weekly medical clinic and free pharmacy were opened. A camp site was acquired on Waiheke Island at Oneroa and summer camps for poor children held.

=== 1930s ===
The first Mission shop and doss house on Lorne Street were opened. A prison chaplain was appointed. The Jasper Calder Charity Fund was established, and the government provided a subsidy for the doss house, which was kept open all year, with large numbers of people using it. An emergency house was established and the night shelter was moved to a large Hobson Street building. Governor General Lord Bledisloe visited and questions were raised in Parliament over the non-payment of the state's share of the night shelter set-up. The Mission was ruled to be exempt from paying rates as it was recognised as a charity, and not simply a branch of the Church. A free dental clinic was provided and the offices moved to Queen Street.

=== 1940s ===
Calder retired and Doug Caswell was appointed as the new City Missioner. The Montgomery Youth Hostel was opened on Sale Street (and later moved to Greys Avenue).

=== 1950s ===
The Selwyn Village was opened in Point Chevalier. The Mission moved its headquarters to Greys Avenue. The Auckland City Mission Statute was approved by the Auckland Anglican Synod.

=== 1960s ===
A children's court chaplain was appointed. The Church of the Holy Sepulchre on Khyber Pass Road was given to the Mission. A warehouse was opened in Surrey Crescent as Mission opportunity shops grow in number. The Family Guidance Centre was established. The Selwyn Foundation was created by the Mission. Rev'd W.A. Garraway was appointed City Missioner. Bishop Gowing informed the Mission that the Anglican Franciscans would be taking over the Mission.

=== 1970s ===
Brother Michael Thomas from the Franciscans became the City Missioner. A new Auckland City Mission Statute was approved by the Anglican Synod. Anglican Methodist Social Services was created and the Mission vacated Holy Sepulchre Church and moved to Airedale Street. Rev'd Don Cowan was appointed City Missioner.

=== 1980s ===
The Prince of Wales pub on Hobson Street was purchased as the new home for the Mission. Old people's chaplaincy commenced. A detox unit was set up on Federal Street. A teenagers' home was established on Jervois Road and a women's refuge founded in Western Springs with the HELP Foundation.

=== 1990s ===
Rev'd Paul Bathurst was appointed City Missioner, then Rev'd Richard Buttle, then Diane Robertson. The Herne Bay House for HIV/AIDS patients was opened on Jervois Road. The annual Christmas Lunch fundraising event began, and was initially sponsored by SkyCity. A child trauma centre was started.

=== 2000s ===
A new Auckland City Mission Statute was passed by the Anglican Synod. A building at 136-8 Hobson Street was purchased. The Capital Foundation and Calder Health Centre were established.

=== 2010s ===
City Missioner Diane Robertson was knighted for services to the community. Chris Farrelly was appointed City Missioner. The Hobson Street and Federal Street buildings were demolished and construction of HomeGround began. The detox unit temporarily moved to Avondale and the community centre Haeata was opened at the Mission's temporary home on Union Street.

=== 2020s ===
The Auckland City Mission Statute was amended by the Anglican Synod. Te Whare Hīnātore and James Liston Hostel transitional housing services were opened and taken over respectively. Helen Robinson was appointed as City Missioner / Manutaki. Former City Missioner Chris Farrelly was knighted for services to health and the community. HomeGround opened on Hobson Street.

In mid-August 2024, the City Mission attracted media attention after it accidentally distributed methamphetamine-laced sweets as part of a food parcel. The charity estimated that up to 400 people may have received the sweets. The sweets were donated anonymously in a sealed package. Three people sought medical attention while the Police launched an investigation in the Auckland Region. Malaysian confectioner Rinda told BBC News that the company was aware that their products may have been used in connection with illegal substances and that the company was cooperating with law enforcement and relevant authorities.

== HomeGround ==
HomeGround, the Mission's purpose-built, nine-storey building opened on Hobson Street, Central Auckland in February 2022. It includes 80 permanent apartment homes rented to people in need, a shared residents' rooftop garden and communal lounge, a community dining room which operates every day of the year with free food for people in need, community spaces, a health centre, a pharmacy and addiction withdrawal services, including 25 rooms for people overcoming addictions. The Waitematā District Health Board's Community Alcohol and Drug Services manages the medical services and the Mission manages the social services.

Any people in need can come to HomeGround at any time of the day to receive a loaf of bread, a hot drink, clothes, blankets or other necessities. The Mission also participates in Foodlink and receives bulk food donations, which it distributes to community food banks throughout the Auckland Anglican Diocese, from Kaitaia to Thames. In 2013 the Mission distributed 10,000 food parcels a year, in 2021 it delivered more than 60,000. Each parcel provides four people three meals for four days.

HomeGround cost NZ$110 million to build. The money was contributed by Government, Auckland Council, Auckland District Health Board, Foundation North, businesses and members of the public.

== Funding ==
The Auckland City Mission relies heavily on donations, as well as support from almost 5,000 volunteers every year. Trusts and the Mission's op shops have always been central to funding its ministry. Some donors have been important figures in Auckland's history, including Sir Robert Kerridge, John Courts Limited, and the Ernest Hyam Davis & The Ted and Mollie Carr Endowment Trust. Communities and individuals have also given vital support, like a Mrs Whitney who donated a house on the North Shore. More recently, the ASB Trust have also been generous, as have corporate sponsors that supported building projects. Specific ventures, like the detox unit, the HIV/AIDS house, youth work and chaplaincies received substantial government assistance.

== Gallery ==
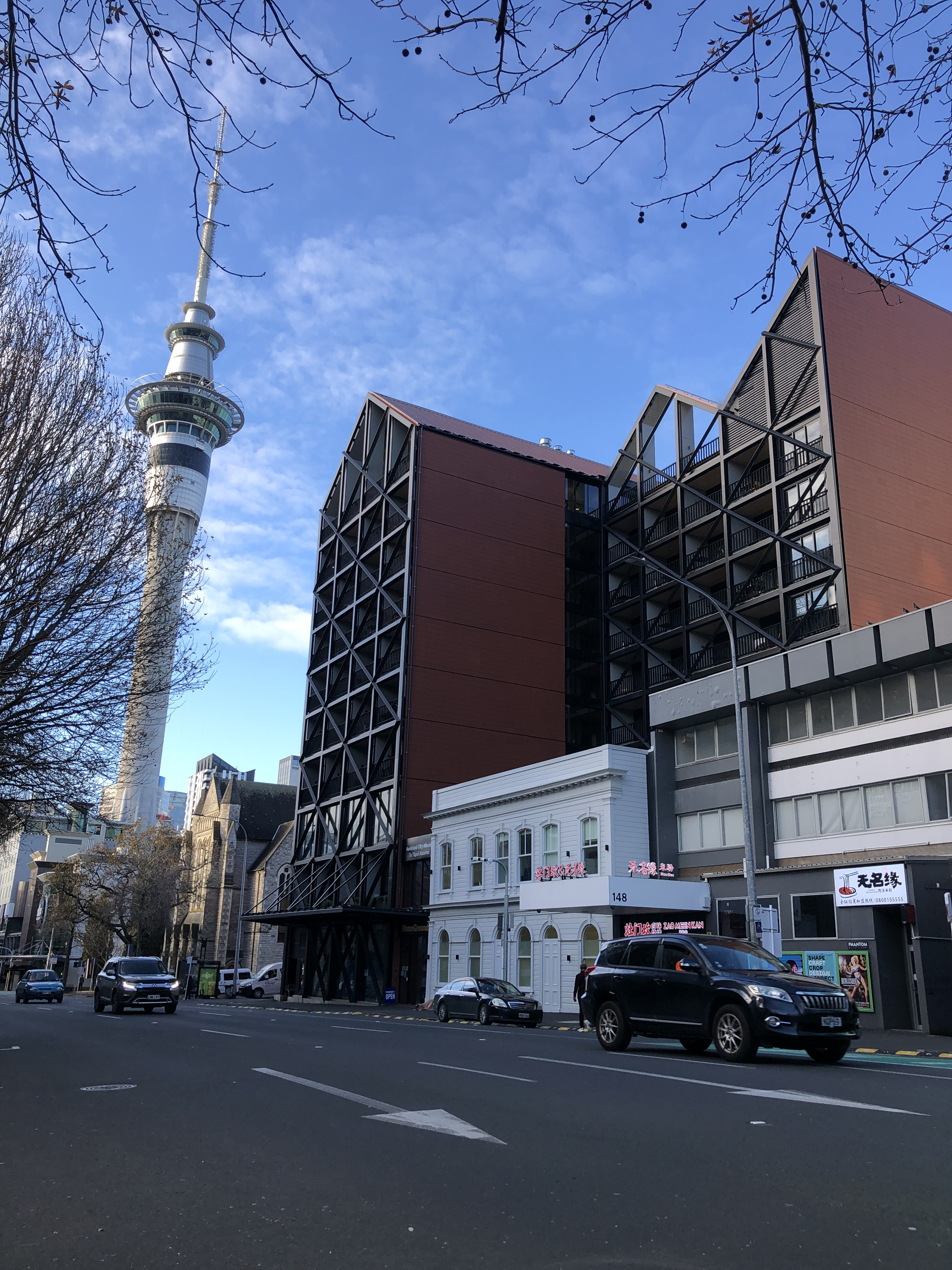
Auckland City Mission's HomeGround building, seen with St Matthew's church and the Sky Tower, 2022.

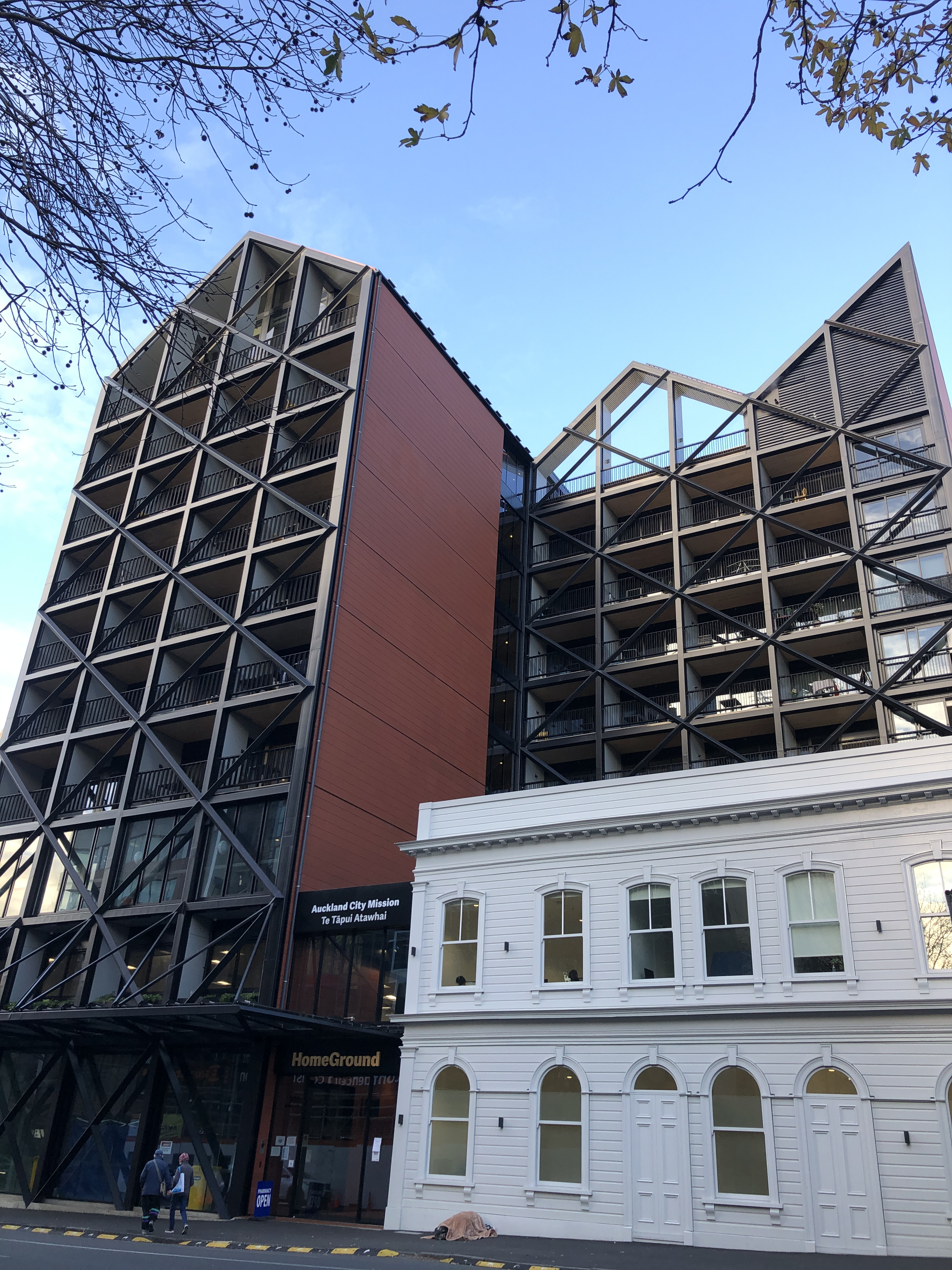
HomeGround on Hobson Street, Auckland, 2022.

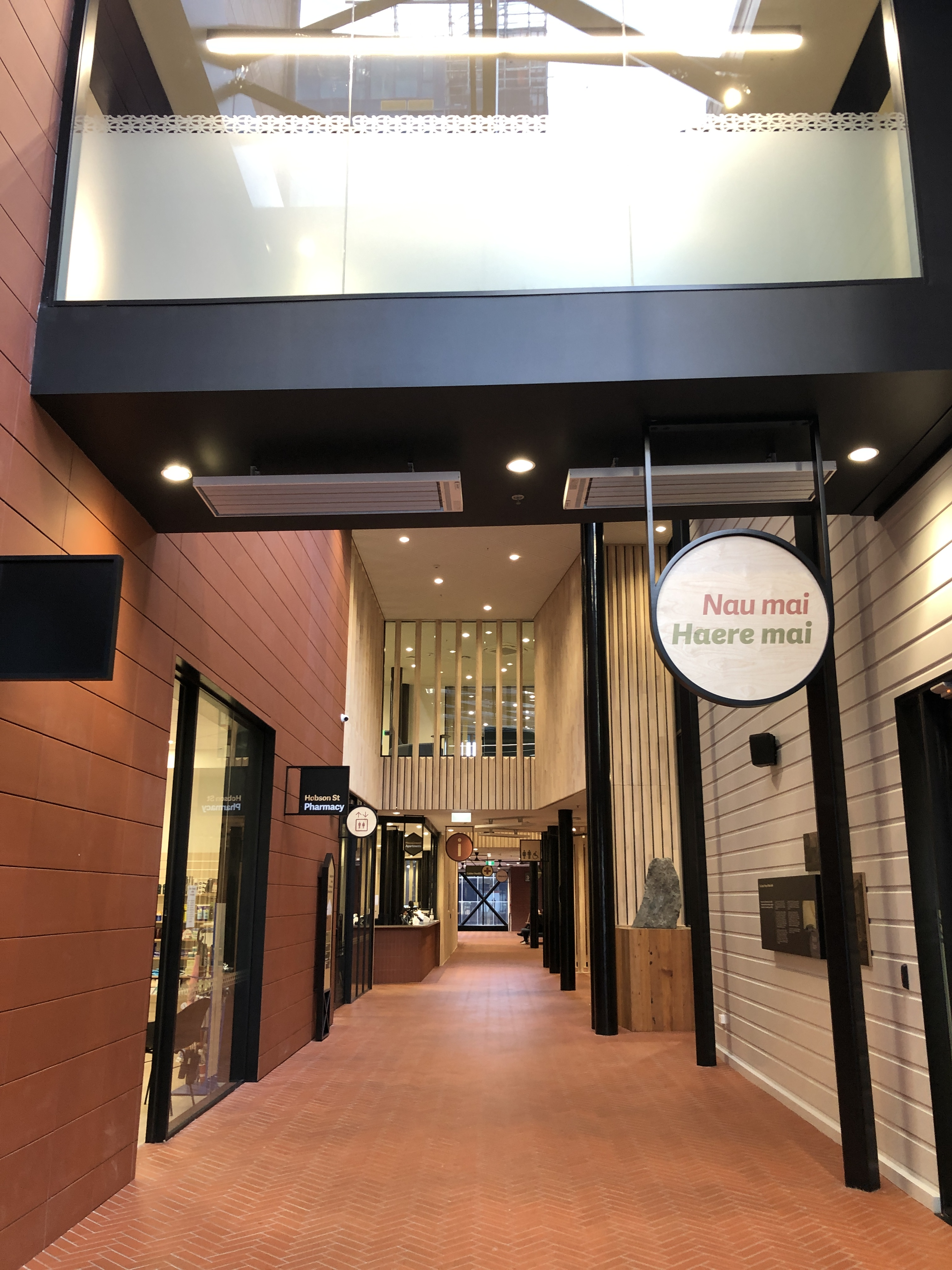
HomeGround's ground floor laneway, 2022.
