= The Bushwhackers (1925 film) =

1925 film

- Everyones 19 July 1925
- Directed by: Raymond Longford
- Written by: Raymond Longford; Lottie Lyell
- Based on: Enoch Arden by Alfred Tennyson
- Produced by: Raymond Longford; Lottie Lyell; Charles Perry
- Starring: Stella Southern; Eddie O'Reilly
- Cinematography: Arthur Higgins
- Production company: Longford-Lyell Productions
- Distributed by: Australasian Films (Union-Master Films)
- Release date: 7 May 1925
- Country: Australia
- Languages: Silent film English intertitles

The Bushwhackers is a 1925 Australian silent film directed by Raymond Longford loosely based on Alfred Tennyson's 1864 poem Enoch Arden. It is considered a lost film.

== Plot ==
Bill Lawson (Eddie O'Reilly), a wharf labourer, loses his job and decides to go out bush to find work to support his wife Elsa (Stella Southern) and daughter Betty. He befriends a well-born Englishman, Kenneth Hillyard (Rawdon Blandford) after rescuing him from two thugs and the two decide to go prospecting together. They have a variety of adventures, including comic ones with Farmer Skinner, who got bitten by a snake, and working as a cook. They stumble upon a gold deposit.

Then while walking along the cliffs one day Bill slips and falls into the river below. Kenneth looks for him but can't find the body and Bill is believed to be dead. Kenneth returns to the city to share the gold with Elsa and Betty. When Kenneth inherits money from an English relative, he proposes to Elsa.

Years later a bush character appears, 'Mad Joe', who is Bill – it turns out Bill survived the fall but lost his memory. He later regains his memory after a hospital operation and tracks down his wife. But once he sees how happy she is with Kenneth, he returns to the bush.

== Cast ==
- Eddie O'Reilly as Bill Lawson
- Stella Southern as Elsa Lawson
- Beryl Gow as Bill's daughter
- Rawdon Blandford as Kenneth Hillyard
- Margaret Reid
- Billy Ryan
- Lottie Lyall
- Percy Walsh
- James Martin
- Ken Smith

== Production ==
Actor Rawdon Blandford wrote a song especially for the film. He later described this and other Australian films he made as "not great efforts" and criticised the quality of Australian directors.

Co-star Eddie O'Reilly (real name Edgar Girard) was a sometime boxer. He later worked as a helper at the Sydney Cricket Ground. In 1926 he was arrested for having sex with a seventeen year old girl despite being married with a child. However it was decided not to go to trial.

Australasian Films bought the film outright from Longford and Lyell for its production cost.

== Release ==
The film premiered on 7 May 1925 before a crowd at Prince Edward Theatre including the Governor Sir Dudley le Chair.

== Reception ==
The Sun wrote "Tho production was thoroughly artistic, and the photographic work was excellent."

The critic from The Bulletin said

The photographer has done justice to^the excellence of Australian scenery for his purposes, but in other respects the picture is only saved from complete failure by the comedy touches. The story... wallows along under a large top hamper of irrelevances. There is a host of uninteresting characters to confuse the audience, and mawkish sub-titles crop up every few feet, with a wordy explanation of almost every movement... amateurish and disappointing.

The critic from the Sydney Morning Herald said that the film's merits:

Lie mainly in its beauty of scenery and photography. There is no plot, as the word is commonly understood. The story simply meanders onward, without complication and without any very definite aim, so that it might be cut off almost anywhere without seeming incomplete... This narrative is embellished with a profusion of irrelevant detail... Characters appear in bewilding profusion, and in a moment or two are gone for ever. Through the midst flows a torrent of wordy subtleties, fully half of which could be eliminated with advantage to the picture... Those who appear before the camera make little pretence of acting, beyond a little buffoonery. Yet, all its weaknesses admitted, the film still retains the interest given it by pleasant comedy touches, and by clearly photographed studies of the harbour, the Blue Mountains, and the rolling f¡elds.

Everyone's said the plot " is rather well carried out, and the central figure, who is of the Sentimental Bloke type, is making his first screen appearance, must be credited with success. The picture is typically Australian in presentation, has some wonderful outdoor photography to recommend it, and, in other essentials, is particularly satisfying. It is one of the better class of local productions.. the acting is above the usual standard, and the continuity of the plot runs along smoothly."

The Adelaide News called the film "a fine one, with Stella Southern playing the feminine lead with grace and charm. The humorous element is strong in a series of irresistibly funny scenes depicting the efforts of an amateur coolk to provide an elaborate meal. Mingled with the humor is a wealth of human interest and a strong plot, based- onI a great friendship between two men of the bush."

The Referee called it "perhaps the best Australian picture yet taken. The scenery is beautiful and the lighting extremely good. The scenes of Sydney Harbour and the Botanic Gardens should be an excellent 'advertisement to Australia from a tourist traffic viewpoint."

=== Overseas ===
The film sold to H.L. Warner for release in the UK.
