= Edwin Coubray =

Projectionist, filmmaker, inventor (1900–1997)

Edwin "Ted" Coubray (19 October 1900 – 10 December 1997) was a New Zealand projectionist, filmmaker and inventor. He was born in Eastern Bush, Southland, New Zealand, and died in Homebush, Sydney. He retired to Australia in 1973 after Auckland Cinemas, for which he was working, closed the Tudor Cinema in Remuera.

He directed and produced Carbine's Heritage (1927); and was involved as cameraman, photography or continuous printer in The Birth of New Zealand (1922), Rewi's Last Stand (1925), The Adventures of Algy (1925), The Romance of Maoriland (1930), Hei Tiki (1935) (although he was fired by the eccentric producer Alexander Markey, who also sold his camera to his rivals, the Welsh brothers), and Rewi's Last Stand (1940). In 1929, he presented New Zealand's first newsreel under the title Coubraytone News.

He built much of his own equipment, and his company was called New Zealand Radio Films.
