= M. L. Stedman =

Australian novelist and lawyer

- Born: 1971 (age 54–55); Western Australia
- Education: University of London
- Occupations: Novelist lawyer
- Writing career
- Language: English
- Years active: 2012-present
- Notable work: The Light Between Oceans

M. L. Stedman (born 1971) is an Australian writer and lawyer. She has lived in London and is notably reticent about sharing personal information, preferring her work to speak for itself.

== Biography ==
ML Stedman was born and raised in Western Australia. She worked as a lawyer in London and later studied creative writing part time at University of London.

== Works ==
Stedman has published two novels, and a series of short fiction and novellas. Her first novel The Light Between Oceans won numerous awards and was adapted to film in 2016, written and directed by Derek Cianfrance and starring Michael Fassbender, Alicia Vikander, Rachel Weisz, Bryan Brown, and Jack Thompson.

== Novels ==
- The Light Between Oceans (2012)
- A Far Flung Life (2026)

== Awards ==
- 2014 International IMPAC Dublin Literary Award — longlisted
- 2013 Australian Book Industry Awards (ABIA) — Australian Newcomer of the Year — winner
- 2013 Australian Book Industry Awards (ABIA) — Australian Book of the Year — shortlisted
- 2013 Australian Book Industry Awards (ABIA) — Australian Literary Fiction Book of the Year — shortlisted
- 2013 Miles Franklin Award — longlisted
- 2013 ASAL Awards — ALS Gold Medal — longlisted
- 2013 Australian Booksellers Association Awards — BookPeople Book of the Year — winner
- 2013 Indie Book Awards Book of the Year – Book of the Year — winner
- 2013 Indie Book Awards Book of the Year – Debut Fiction — winner
