= Chris Farrelly =

New Zealand health administrator and community leader

Sir Chris Farrelly KNZM
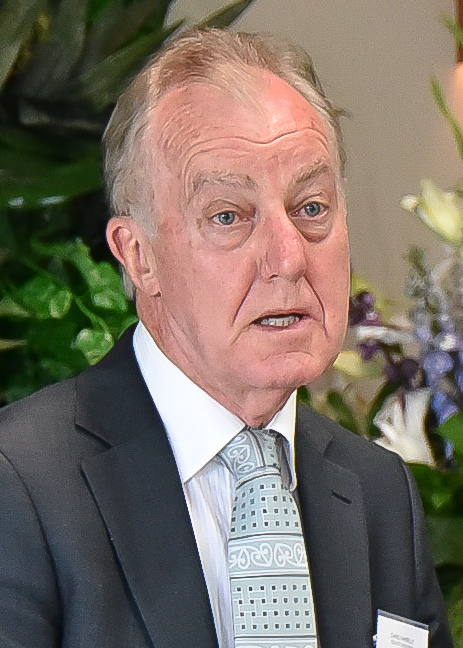
- Farrelly in 2019
- Born: Christopher Patrick Thomas Farrelly; 17 December 1951 (age 74); Te Puke, New Zealand
- Education: St Joseph’s Convent, Otorohanga; Marist Hamilton; De La Salle College, Mangere; Holy Name Seminary Christchurch; St Columban’s College, Sydney; Jesuit School of Theology, Berkeley, USA; Massey University
- Known for: Auckland City Missioner
- Spouse: Susan Mary Rishworth

Sir Christopher Patrick Thomas Farrelly KNZM (born 1951 or 1952) is a New Zealand community leader and health administrator. He was the Auckland City Missioner from 2016 until 2021.

== Honours ==
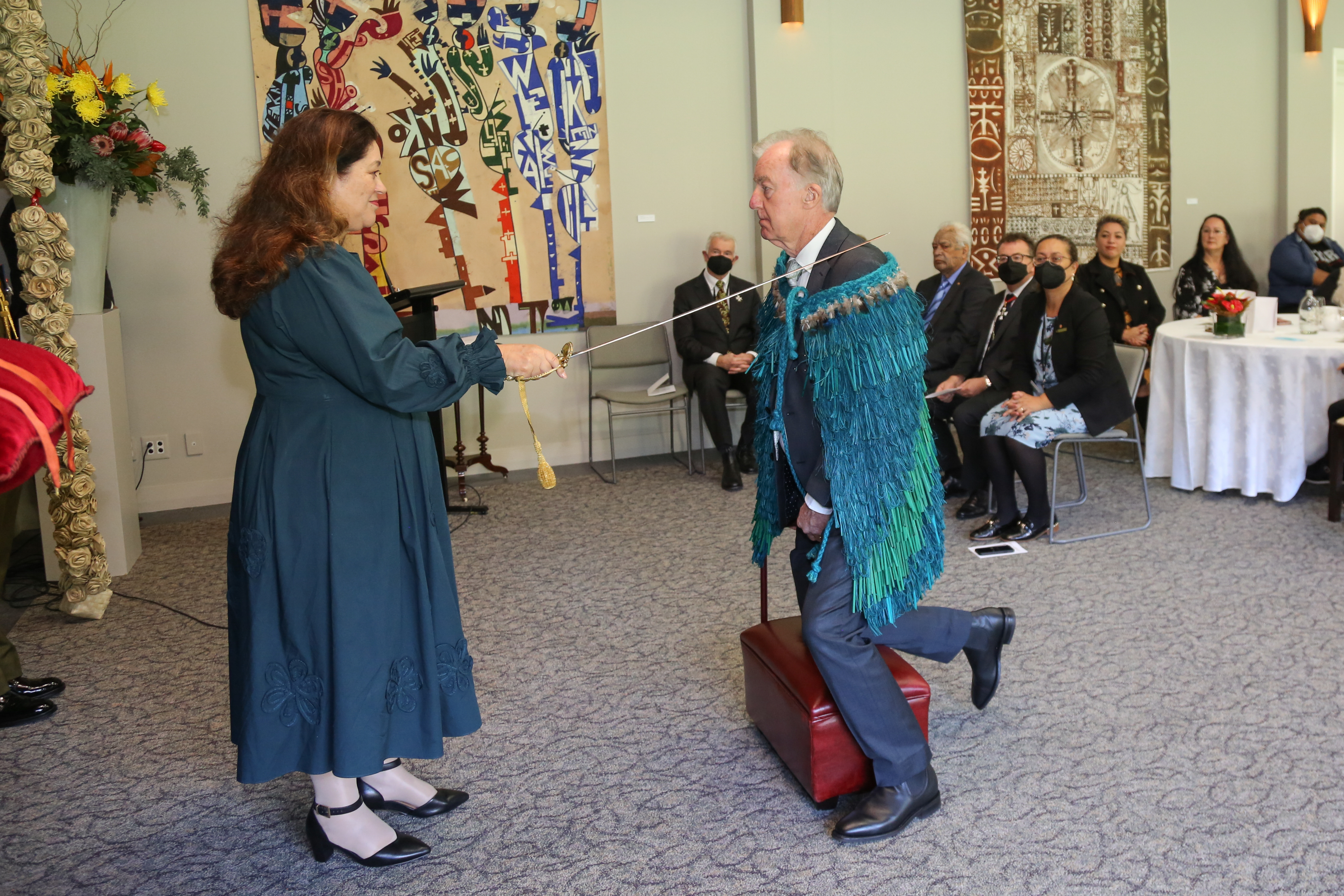
Farrelly is invested as a Knight Companion of the New Zealand Order of Merit by the governor-general, Dame Cindy Kiro, at Government House, Auckland, on 26 May 2022

In the 2022 New Year Honours, Farrelly was appointed a Knight Companion of the New Zealand Order of Merit, for services to health and the community.
