= Under the Southern Cross (1927 film) =

1927 film

- Under the Southern Cross
- Directed by: Gustav Pauli
- Produced by: Gustav Pauli
- Release date: 1927
- Running time: 5000 ft 83 minutes
- Language: English

Under the Southern Cross is a 1927 New Zealand drama film set in New Zealand, directed and produced for Gaumont British by Gustav Pauli.

The film probably has no connection with the 1929 American film of the same name, directed by Lew Collins, and also set in New Zealand.

== Plot ==
A young man in England is wrongly accused of a crime, so emigrates to New Zealand and works on a farm. He falls in love with Hazel, the joint owner of a nearby sheep station. She is also fancied by the station manager but rejects his advances. It transpires that the manager has committed the original crime in England; he is arrested and the young couple are happily united. The "false accusation" and "pioneer settler" plot is similar to The Te Kooti Trail.

== Cast ==
An undated scenario describes the film as "A glimpse of station life - played by an amateur cast of New Zealanders".
