= Ramai Hayward =

New Zealand photographer, actor, and filmmaker (1916–2014)

Ramai Hayward MNZM
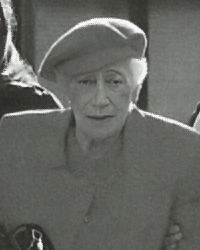
- Hayward in 2002
- Born: 11 November 1916; Martinborough, New Zealand
- Died: 3 July 2014 (aged 97)
- Spouse: Rudall Hayward (m. 1943; died 1974)

Patricia Rongomaitara "Ramai" Hayward MNZM (née Te Miha; 11 November 1916 – 3 July 2014) was a New Zealand photographer, actor, and filmmaker who made films in five countries. Her film career began in 1940 when she co-starred in the historical movie Rewi's Last Stand, after meeting her future husband, legendary New Zealand director Rudall Hayward. The first Māori cinematographer, she spent three years making films in England with Rudall. Later, the couple were the first to make English language films in China after the communist revolution.

== Early life and family ==
Hayward was born in the North Island town of Martinborough in 1916, the daughter of Roihi Te Miha and Fred Mawhiney, a motor mechanic. She affiliated to the Ngāti Kahungunu and Ngāi Tahu iwi (tribes). Her father served in the New Zealand Machine Gun Corps and died of wounds in Belgium in 1917. In 1917 her mother married Jim Miller, and Hayward was subsequently known as Patricia Miller for a period.

Ramai was raised by her grandmother and great-grandfather, Huria Te Miha and Hemi Te Miha, in Pirinoa, Wairarapa until Huria died in 1920. Afterwards, she relocated to Christchurch where her mother and step-father lived.

== Career ==
Ramai trained in stills photography when she became an apprentice to French photographer Henri Harrison in Wellington. In 1937 or 1938 she set up her own photography studio, Patricia Miller Studio, in Devonport, Auckland, and by 1946 she had eight employees and had opened a second studio in Queen Street.

In the late 30s she met director Rudall Hayward, after he cast her as the romantic lead in a remake of his 1925 silent movie Rewi's Last Stand. Both films were inspired by conflicts during the New Zealand Wars.

In 1946 the couple, now married, traveled to England, where they spent around three years. Ramai learnt to operate the sound camera that Rudall had developed back in New Zealand. She was one of the few women working professionally as a cinematographer in the United Kingdom in this period.

The couple also made films in Australia, Albania, and China.

In the 1950s, based again in New Zealand but marketing their films around the world, they began two decades of making scenic films, a series of educational films, and a short film on Opo the dolphin. Ramai's contribution ranged across shooting, scripting, editing, and co-directing, but as Rudall got older, Ramai took on increasing responsibilities. Some say she was the primary force on their final feature film, 1972's To Love a Maori, which was the first local dramatic feature shot in colour.

Rudall died in 1974. In her later years, Ramai continued to take occasional acting roles. She was also active in advocating land rights pertaining to her iwi of Ngāti Kahungunu around Pirinoa. In the early 1990s, Hayward reportedly refused a damehood after taking part in years of protests, over Government plans to sell Cape Palliser Lighthouse and surrounding lands to overseas buyers. She died in July 2014.

== Honours ==
In the 2006 New Year Honours, Hayward was appointed a Member of the New Zealand Order of Merit, for services to film and television.
