= Carbine's Heritage =

1927 film

- Directed by: Ted Coubray
- Written by: Ted Coubray
- Produced by: Ted Coubray
- Starring: Ted Preston; Queenie Grahame
- Cinematography: Ted Coubray
- Release date: 1927
- Language: English

Carbine's Heritage is a 1927 New Zealand film created by Ted Coubray who directed, produced and wrote the screenplay. The film is now presumed to be lost.

== Plot ==
A young man finds a loose stray colt near Hamilton which is not advertised for. So after a year he enters the colt in a show at which the owner, a young lady who comes to the show with her father, claims it. They come to an arrangement about the horse, which is a descendant of the famous horse Carbine. Then the horse is stolen by a pair of villains when being trained. The climatic end sequence was filmed at the Christmas 1926 Auckland Cup meeting.

== Cast ==
- Ted Preston ... Tim Hogan
- Queenie Grahame ... Alice Wylie
- Stuart Douglas ... Harold Wylie
- Pat O'Connor ... Tom Patten
- Cook Brothers ... Two crooks

== See also ==
- List of films about horses
