= Towheads (film) =

2013 American drama film

- Directed by: Shannon Plumb
- Written by: Shannon Plumb
- Produced by: Hunter Gray; Alex Orlovsky
- Starring: Shannon Plumb; Derek Cianfrance; Lora Lee Gayer
- Cinematography: Brett Jutkiewicz
- Edited by: Joseph Krings
- Music by: Dave Wilder
- Release date: March 27, 2013 (US)
- Running time: 85 minutes
- Country: United States
- Language: English

Towheads is a 2013 American drama film directed by Shannon Plumb and starring Shannon Plumb, Derek Cianfrance, and Lora Lee Gayer.

== Plot ==
Penny, on overwhelmed mother of 2 and spouse to an emotionally unsupportive theater director, struggles to find time to create art. Throughout the movie she dons different disguises, including a bell ringing Santa, a strip dancer, and a drag king.

== Cast ==
- Shannon Plumb as Penelope
- Derek Cianfrance as Matt
- Cody Cianfrance as Cody
- Walker Cianfrance as Walker
- Lora Lee Gayer as Lily
- Yinka Adeboyeku as Construction Worker #1
- Michael Massimino as Construction Worker #2

== Reception ==
At Metacritic, the film had mixed or average reviews with 56 out of 100 based on five critics.

Andrew Schenker of Slant Magazine gave the film a half star, noting that the film was "so tone deaf, unfunny, and generally wrongheaded".
