= Jasper Calder =

New Zealand priest and social worker (1885–1956)

The Reverend Jasper Calder MBE
- Missioner of Auckland
- Photograph by Frederick William Young (c. 1929)
- Church: Anglican Church in Aotearoa, New Zealand and Polynesia

Orders
- Ordination: 1910

Personal details
- Born: Jasper Cyril Austin Calder; 22 May 1885
- Died: 10 February 1956 (aged 70)
- Denomination: Anglican
- Residence: Auckland, New Zealand
- Parents: Rev'd William Calder, Lucy Calder
- Spouse: Agnes Baxter Calder (nee Clarke)
- Children: Basil Calder, Rev'd Matthew Calder, Dr Denver Calder
- Education: King's College, London, St John's College, Auckland

Jasper Cyril Austin Calder MBE (1885–1956) was a New Zealand Anglican priest who established the Auckland City Mission in 1920 and was Chair and Missioner for its first 26 years.

Calder was born in Ponsonby, Auckland, the second son of Rev'd William Calder, an Anglican vicar and later Archdeacon of Auckland and Lucy Calder, a bible class teacher and fund raiser. He was educated at Ponsonby School and Auckland Grammar School, and studied at King's College, London, and St John's College, Auckland. He entered the Anglican ministry in 1910. He was a curate in Whangārei and St Matthew's in central Auckland, and was a vicar in Grey Lynn. Calder married Agnes Baxter Clarke in 1912.

Calder established the 'City Mission of the Anglican Church' (now the Auckland City Mission) at the end of the devastating World War I and Spanish flu epidemic, in 1920, and was Chair and Missioner for the next 26 years. The Mission's work increased into the Great Depression, and included a night shelter with a food kitchen, feeding hundreds of people every day, a medical clinic, children’s health camps, and a second-hand clothing shop to help fund the other services. Calder said the Mission started "with no money, no rules but with an excellent committee, a lot of enthusiasm and a mighty big faith."

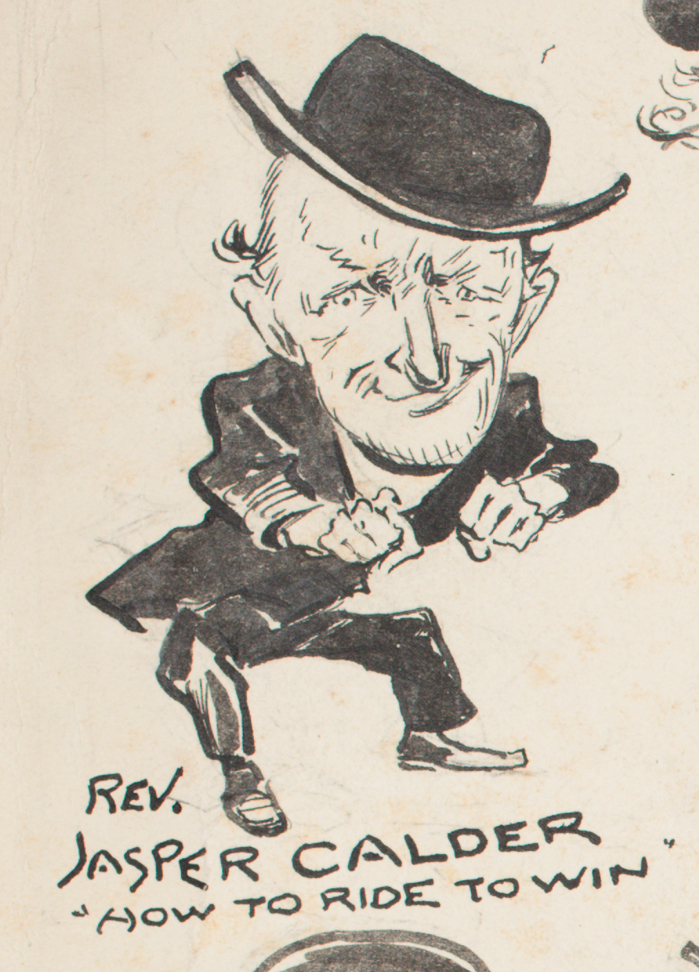
Caricature by William Blomfield (c. 1930)

Historian, Professor Peter Lineham says Calder "was an Anglican Modernist, far more liberal in his Anglicanism than almost all his fellow clergy, and he alienated many from his ability to scoff at the church, defy regulations, hold services in theatres and on beaches, promote the role of women and scoff at traditional Protestant revivalism."

Calder was awarded an M.B.E. in 1935 for charitable and philanthropic services. After semi-retiring in 1946 he grew vegetables on his Pakuranga farm for charitable institutions, and operated two launches giving about 6,000 children, elderly and deserving people trips on the Waitematā Harbour over ten years until his death in 1956. He was made the honorary chaplain to the yachtsmen of Auckland and an honorary probation officer to the Auckland Racing Club. A whāriki (woven mat) that was given to Calder by Māori who wanted to recognise his mana (status) is held in the Auckland Museum. The Auckland City Mission's Calder Health Centre was established in 2008 in his name, and now operates out of the Mission's HomeGround building.
