= Alexander Markey =

American filmmaker

Alexander Markey (1891–1958) was an American filmmaker and founder of Markey Films. He was born in Hungary and died in Switzerland.

From 1928 to 1935 he was in New Zealand making films about the Māori people. In 1928 he was sent by Carl Laemmle of Universal Studios to make a film he called Taranga, but did not keep to schedule or make any effective footage. The film was completed as Under the Southern Cross by Lew Collins.

Two years later and described as "somewhat eccentric" Markey then returned for the making of Hei Tiki; originally a silent film, which was released in 1935 with music and voice-over added in America. The film was shot in Waihi. When shooting was finished Markey left for America with “the film footage, many of the artifacts he had borrowed from Māori, a great many unpaid bills, and his partner Zoe Varney”. He had obtained £10,000 from New Zealand investors, and borrowed taonga or cherished tribal artifacts from the Māori cast. He had fired Alfred Hill who was to write the music, and Ted Coubray the original cameraman, but sold Coubray's camera to his rivals the Welsh brothers.

A 1935 New York Times review of Hei Tiki says that Merkey had been a lecturer and editor. In 1944, Markey published a series of discourses titled Silent Revelations of Meher Baba. Meher Baba had given Markey permission to rework a series of his discourses given in the 1930s, edited by C. D. Deshmukh.
