= Rotohiko Tangonui Haupapa =

New Zealand Māori leader

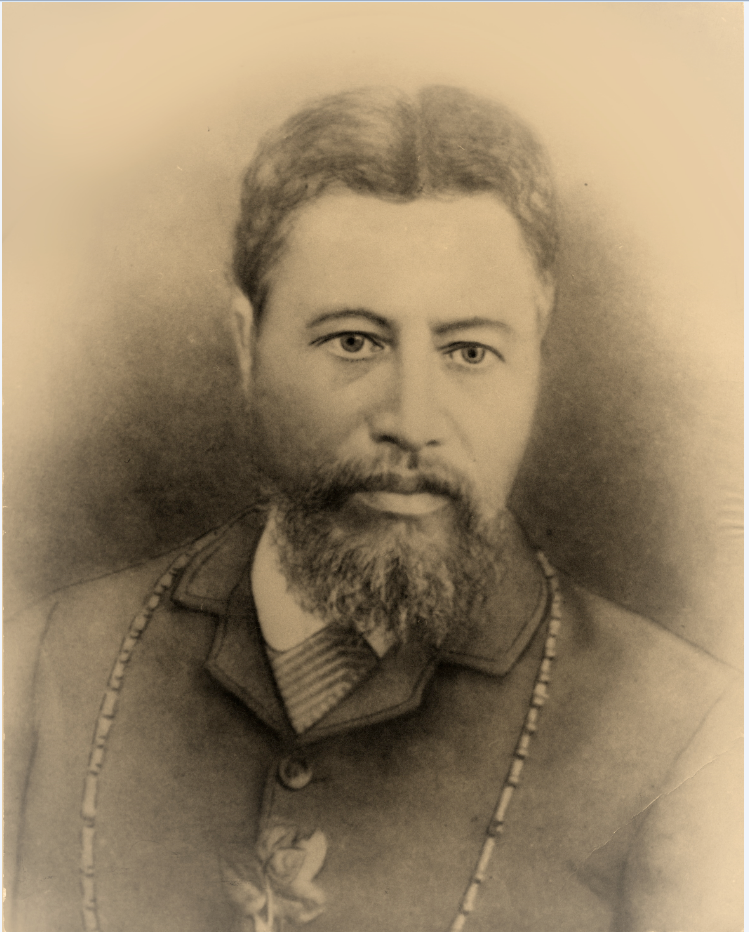
A portrait of Haupapa

Rotohiko Tangonui Haupapa (c. 1836 – 1 August 1887) was a notable New Zealand Māori leader of the Ngāti Whakaue tribe. He was born in Ohinemutu, Rotorua in about 1836, and is best known for his efforts to promote education in the area, especially by his donations of land, some of which are now the site of Rotorua Primary School. Haupapa Street, in the centre of Rotorua city, is named in his honour.
