= My Lady of the Cave =

1922 film

- Directed by: Rudall Hayward
- Release date: 25 February 1922
- Running time: 71 mins
- Country: New Zealand
- Language: English
- Budget: £1,000

My Lady of the Cave is a 1922 New Zealand silent film which was the first feature from Rudall Hayward. It was based on a popular story by H. T. Gibson, which was published serially in several newspapers.

The film was shot over seven weeks, starting December 1921. Six of these weeks were spent on Mayor Island, in the Bay of Plenty region; filming also took place at nearby Tauranga. The story revolves around a shipwrecked sailor's encounter with a woman who has been brought up on an isolated island.

Hayward later said:

The photography was magnificent but the story was fairly crude. It was notable for its scenery and its action. What money we made in New Zealand we lost trying to get it released overseas.

A contemporary review in The New Zealand Herald also praised the film's photography:

The crowds of patrons who thronged to the Grand Theatre at all sessions yesterday to witness the first screenings of this really fine film found no need to exercise tolerance towards a local effort. On the contrary, they were very soon made aware that here was a picture that redounded to the credit of all concerned in its making. Of chief importance in any such venture, the photographic effects instantly commanded admiration [...] The story is refreshingly wholesome, the scenic gems are a delight to view, and the New Zealand atmosphere is faithfully retained.
