= The Te Kooti Trail =

1927 New Zealand historic drama film

- Directed by: Rudall Hayward
- Based on: Work by Frank Bodle
- Starring: Te Pairi Tūterangi; Tina Hunt; Mary Kingi; Tom McDermott
- Cinematography: Rudall Hayward
- Edited by: Hilda Hayward
- Release date: 1927
- Running time: 103 minutes
- Country: New Zealand
- Languages: Silent; English intertitles

The Te Kooti Trail is a 1927 New Zealand historic drama film about Te Kooti, based on a newspaper serial written by Frank Bodle. This silent film is described as New Zealand's first docudrama and was created by husband and wife team Rudall and Hilda Hayward.

== Synopsis ==
The film is a historical drama about the Māori leader Te Kooti, showing exploits from Te Kooti's War that was part of the New Zealand Wars of the late 19th century.

== About ==
Initial screening of the film was held up when the New Zealand censor stopped the film because of its "disturbing realism". This fact was used in the film's promotional material. The film censor had arranged special screenings for key Māori to view it in advance of a general release to ensure it did not cause offence. After proof of historical accuracy, the film was released following changes to two intertitle cards.

The Māori cast were all from the Te Urewera region and Ngāti Tūhoe chief Te Pairi Tūterangi played Te Kooti. As a child he had known Te Kooti. With the costuming for the film Tūterangi's resemblance to Te Kooti was said to be close, and because he had known Te Kooti he portrayed his mannerisms very well, particular in an early scene of Te Kooti preaching.

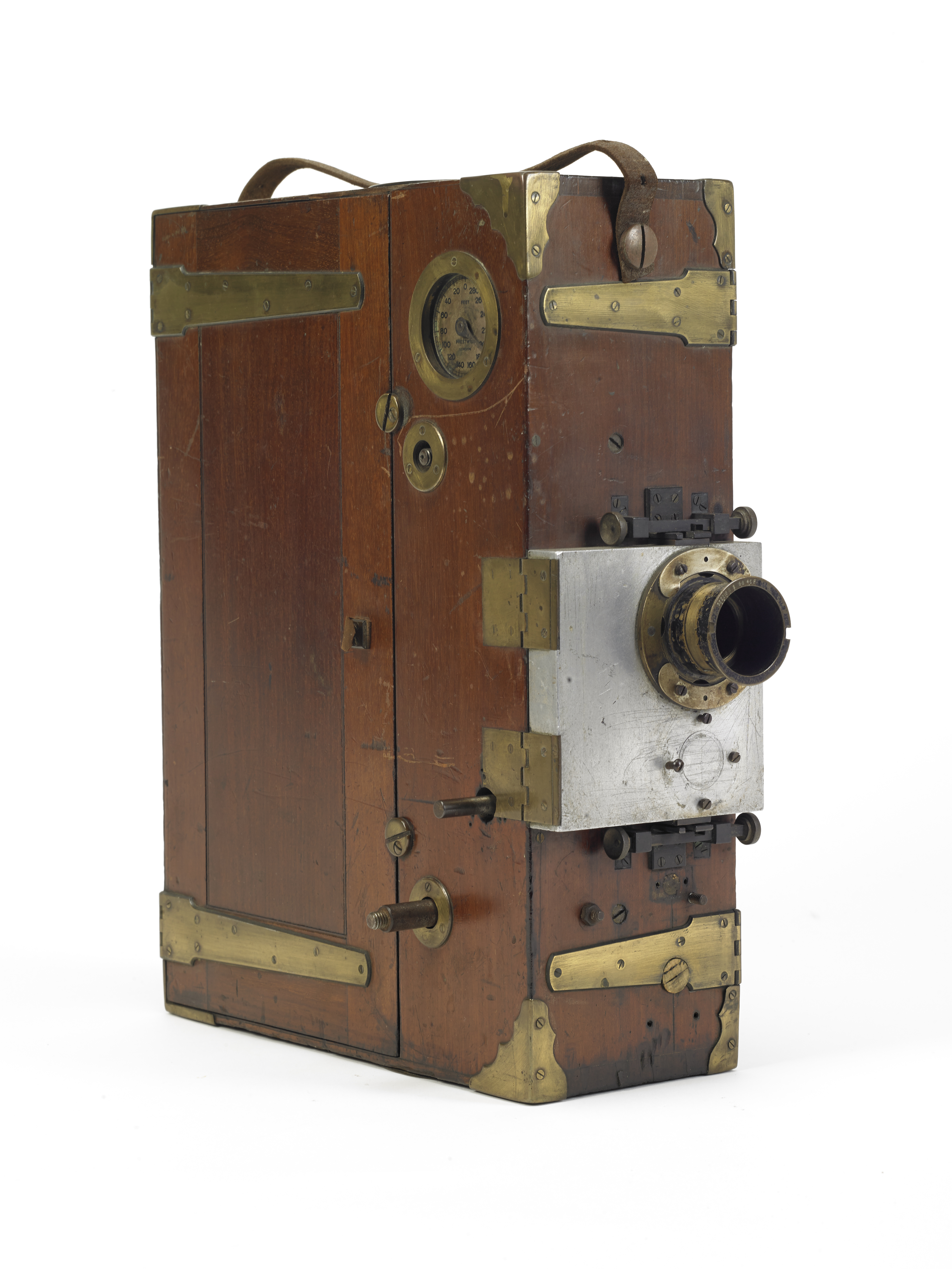
The camera used to film The Te Kooti Trail

One of the actors in the film, Tom McDermott, introduced a 1964 screening of film by the Upper Hutt Film Society. McDermott was critical to the survival of the film as the National Film Library discovered and preserved the only existing copy of the film that had been 'disintegrating in its metal container in his garage'.

The Te Kooti Trail featured in New Zealand's contribution to the British Film Institute's Century of Cinema series, Cinema of Unease: A Personal Journey by Sam Neill (1995).

The style of cinematography in The Te Kooti Trail is described as 'perfunctory and functional' with static shots of people in landscape and none of the dramatic lighting and more mobile camera style that became common by the end of the 1920s. Some scenes were filmed on location in the same places as the historical events they were depicting in Whakatāne and Te Urewera. The film was edited by Hilda Hayward, who was later praised by the film historian Sam Edwards for 'constructing the subtleties of the narrative'. Edwards also says that The Te Kooti Trail was 'New Zealand’s first significant docudrama' and acknowledges the quality storytelling and camera work of director and cinematographer Rudall Hayward.

== Cast ==
- Tina Hunt as Monika
- Mary Kingi as Erihapeti
- Tom McDermott as Gilbert Mair
- Te Pairi Tūterangi as Te Kooti
- H. Redmond as Jean Guerrin
- Patiti Warbrick as Taranahi
- Jasper Calder
- Billie Andreasson
- Arthur Lord
- Eric Yandall
- Edward Armitage
- AP Warbrick
- J Tennant
- J Warner
- Arapeta Tuati
- Tipene Hotene

== Awards ==
Preservation with transfer from nitrate was completed with UNESCO support in 1994. In 2000 the New Zealand Film Archive won the Haghefilm Award. The restored print premiered at Le Giornate del Cinema Muto, Italy in 2001, celebrating Rudall Hayward's centenary.
