= Under the Southern Cross (1929 film) =

1929 film

- Directed by: Lew Collins
- Produced by: Lew Collins
- Edited by: Hugh Hoffmann
- Music by: Bathie Stuart
- Distributed by: Universal Pictures
- Release date: 1929
- Running time: 5579 ft US silent 5606 then 6279 ft UK; 6642 ft US sound
- Languages: Sound (Part-Talkie); English Intertitles

Under the Southern Cross also known as The Devil's Pit or Taranga, is a 1929 American sound part-talkie drama film set in New Zealand, directed and produced by Lew Collins for Universal Studios, who also wrote the screenplay. Originally titled Taranga by the original director Alexander Markey, the film was completed by Collins and released as Under the Southern Cross in 1929. In addition to sequences with audible dialogue or talking sequences, the film features a synchronized musical score, singing and sound effects along with English intertitles. The film was retitled as The Devil’s Pit in 1930. The film was shot on White Island, which has an active volcano.

It is one of four films (with Down on the Farm, Hei Tiki and On the Friendly Road) which claim to be the first "New Zealand talkie", although dubious as the sound was added for the 1930 release in the United States.

For many years the film was believed to be lost until in 1980 the silent version of the 1930 part-talkie sound version was discovered by British film historian Kevin Brownlow under the title Dragon’s Pit. This 1929 film has no connection with the 1927 British film of the same name, directed by Gustav Pauli.

The original director Alexander Marky was replaced a few weeks into filming.

== Plot ==
In pre-European New Zealand there are two hostile Māori tribes. The chief of one tribe proposes to marry his daughter Miro into the other tribe, the Waiti. But a contest, The Challenge of the Spear, must be held, with the victor to marry Miro. Rangi, a vicious warrior wins by trickery. Miro is by tapu forbidden from seeing her true love Patiti. But Patiti rows across the lake to see her nightly, until the suspicious Rangi finds them. In a deadly struggle on the edge of the volcano, Patiti forces Rangi into the volcano. War resumes, but love brings a compromise and Miro and Patiti marry.

== Cast ==
- Patiti Warbrick as Patiti
- Witarina Mitchell as Miro

== See also ==
- List of early sound feature films (1926–1929)

== Notes ==
- New Zealand Film 1912-1996 by Helen Martin & Sam Edwards, p. 42 (1997, Oxford University Press, Auckland) ISBN 019 558336 1
