= Down on the Farm (1935 film) =

1935 New Zealand film

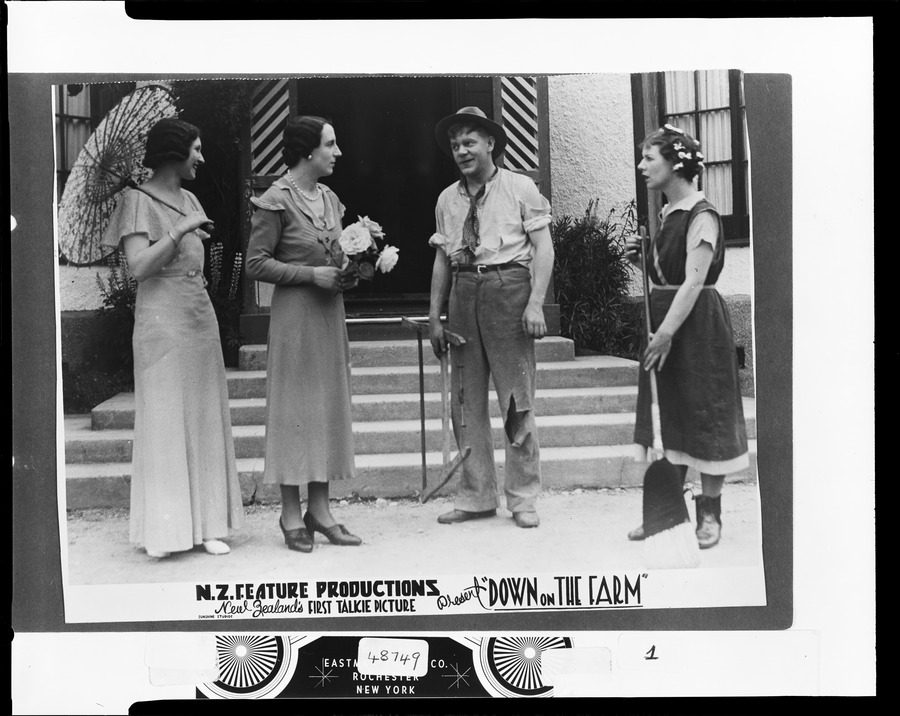
- Directed by: Stewart Pitt
- Produced by: Lee Hill
- Starring: Daphne Murdoch, Ra Hould (Ronald Sinclair)
- Cinematography: Lee Hill
- Release date: 1935
- Running time: 6300 ft 105 min
- Country: New Zealand
- Language: English

Down on the Farm is a 1935 New Zealand film. It was New Zealand's first sound feature. It is one of four films which lay claim to being the first "New Zealand talkie"; however, of the other three, The Devil's Pit and Hei Tiki had sound added in America, and On the Friendly Road was not released until 1936. Little footage and no script of the film have survived.

The film's director was Stewart Pitt, a cinema manager in Dunedin for many years, who had encouraged New Zealand film-makers and had exhibited many locally made films at his cinema, including weekly New Zealand newsreels. Casting was completed in September 1934, and filming began at Woodside, near Dunedin, in October. A comedy of farm life, the film was shot mainly in Otago and Southland, and most of the cast were from Dunedin. The story is about two rival farmers, who have to resolve their differences when their children fall in love.

Down on the Farm had its first public screening at midnight on 2 May 1935 in Dunedin. The report in the Otago Daily Times the next day commended the photography, production and acting, but found these achievements were "seriously circumscribed as a result of the dubious quality of the scenario". It described the leading actress, Daphne Murdoch, as "a very engaging star. She has the happy knack of photographing well at all times".

The film was not a financial success in New Zealand. It was unsuccessful in securing a release in the UK, where Cine Weekly said of it: "The dialogue is a joke, the acting amateurish and the photography poor. After this our colonial cousins will be well advised to restrict their exports to mutton."
