= On the Friendly Road =

1936 New Zealand film

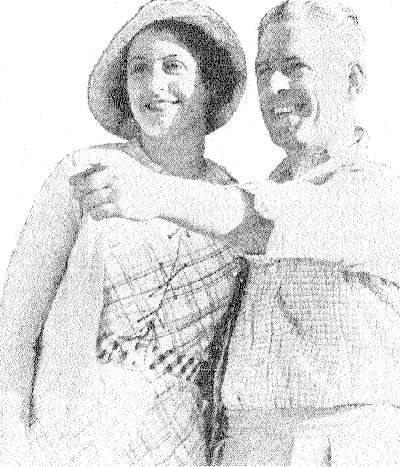
- Jean Hamilton and John Mackle in On the Friendly Road
- Directed by: Rudall Hayward
- Based on: radio show by Colin Scrimgeour
- Release date: 1936
- Running time: 7592 feet 84 minutes
- Country: New Zealand
- Language: English
- Budget: £800 (initial)

On the Friendly Road is a 1936 film from New Zealand which told a story of New Zealand in the Depression. It was made in and around Auckland, using local actors and locally made cameras.

It is one of four films made in 1935 (with The Devil's Pit, Down on the Farm, and Hei Tiki ) which lay claim to be the first "New Zealand talkie". However, the film was not completed until early 1936, and had its premiere in Auckland on 28 August 1936.

== Plot ==
The plot involves Mac McDermott who is wrongly accused of theft and imprisoned, but is finally vindicated and cleared. The crusading Rev Colin Scrimgeour played himself.

== Cast ==
- John Mackle as McDermott
- Jean Hamilton as Mary
- Stanley Knight as Bill
- Colin Scrimgeour as Uncle Scrim
- James Swan as Stevenson
- Neville Goodwin as Harry
- James Martin as Alex
- Arnold Goodwin as Mike
- Harold Metcalfe as Snuffy
- Alan Leonard as the Bobby
- Wharepaia as Hori
- Kahu as the Chieftainess

== Reception ==
After the premiere, the reviewer for the Auckland Star called the film "a minor triumph. The film undoubtedly reaches a good standard and its ingredients of drama and sparkling comedy are mixed in a manner to command the attention of the audience throughout", but added that "the dialogue has its weaknesses and there is an occasional hiatus in the action". The New Zealand film historian Sam Edwards said in 1997 that the film has one-dimensional characters so is melodramatic, and "has not improved with age".
