= To Love a Maori =

- Directed by: Rudall Hayward; Ramai Hayward
- Written by: Diane Francis; Ramai Hayward; Rudall Hayward
- Produced by: Rudall Hayward; Ramai Hayward
- Starring: Val Irwin; Marie Searell; Sybil Locke
- Cinematography: Alton Francis
- Edited by: Alton Francis; Rudall Hayward
- Music by: Ray Gunter
- Release date: 1972
- Running time: 103 minutes
- Country: New Zealand
- Language: English

To Love a Maori is a 1972 New Zealand film about an interracial romance. It was the seventh and last feature from Rudall Hayward.

== Synopsis ==
Two young Maori men, Tama and Riki move to Auckland. They then face racial discrimination, especially Tama, when he associates with Penny a Pākehā whose parents strongly object.

== Cast ==
- Val Irwin as Tama
- Marie Searell as Penny
- Sybil Locke as Penny's mother
- Desmond Locke as Penny's father
- Rau Hotere as Riki
- Toby Curtis as Tama's father
- Olive Pompaller as Tama's mother
- Vincent Sharpe as Mr. Lukers
- Ramai Hayward as Tama's auntie
- Robin Peel-Walker as Fancy Pants
- Pam Ferris as Deirdre
- Harold Kissin as Golfing partner
- Tom Newnham as Headmaster
- Tony Blackett
- Connie Rota
- Hinerangi Deller
- Tairongo Amoamo
- Matangi Kingi
- Peter Sharp
