= The Bush Cinderella =

1928 New Zealand film

- Directed by: Rudall Hayward
- Starring: Dale Austen; Mae Bain; Allan Cornish
- Edited by: Hilda Hayward
- Release date: 4 August 1928
- Running time: 85 minutes
- Country: New Zealand
- Languages: Silent; English intertitles

The Bush Cinderella is a 1928 silent New Zealand film starring Dale Austen, the second Miss New Zealand.

It was filmed in and around Auckland in 1928.

== Cast ==
- Dale Austen as Margaret Cameron / Mary Cameron
- Mae Bain as Mrs. Codlin
- Allan Cornish as The Doctor
- Tony Firth as Sergeant Bennett
- Walter Gray as Andrew Cameron
- Al Mack as Sammy
- Tom McDermott as Sam Codlin
- Cecil Scott as Lieutenant Neal Harrison
- Ernest Yandall as Michael Myrgatroyd
- J Scott as The family lawyer
- Freda Crosher as Jane Codlin
- Arthur Lord as Crook
- Jack De Rose as Crook
- Frank Willoughby as Dr Stanway
- Fred Chatwin as The detective
- Jack Elmsworth as Captain of “The Rio Maid”
- Tano Fama as First Mate
- Willie Kyle as Codlin Kid
- A Vaughn as Codlin Kid
- K Davies as Codlin Kid
- N Pearson as Codlin Kid
- M Pearson as Codlin Kid
- Maurice Quinn as Codlin Kid
- Phillippa Hayward as Codlin Kid
