= Hei Tiki =

- Directed by: Alexander Markey
- Written by: Alexander Markey
- Produced by: Alexander Markey
- Release date: 1935
- Running time: 121 minutes
- Language: English

Hei Tiki, also known as Primitive Passions and Hei Tiki: A Saga of the Maoris, is a 1935 American mock documentary film made in New Zealand by the eccentric Alexander Markey and released (with sound added) in America. The film gained notoriety in America for having scenes of nudity cut in various states.

Markey directed and produced the film, also writing the screenplay and the "native melodies". His girlfriend Zoe Varney was credited as associate producer. Alfred Hill, the original composer, and Ted Coubray, the original cameraman, were both fired and not credited; Coubray also lost his camera to Markey. The film used unpaid Māori extras, and taonga, their cherished tribal artefacts, were lent by the cast; Markey took the artefacts when he returned to America, leaving unpaid bills behind him. Local investors had invested £10,000 in the film.

The film was shot in Waihi. It was released in America with sound added; a symphonic score by Oscar Potoker was added using the RCA Photophone System and "voice-over" narration, which avoided the problems of synchronisation.

Hei Tiki is one of four films (with The Devil's Pit, Down on the Farm, and On the Friendly Road) which claim to be the first "New Zealand talkie", although the claim is dubious in this case as the sound was added in America.

== Plot ==
Mara, the daughter of a chief, is dedicated to the tribal war god and is isolated on the Island of Ghosts on a lake. Manui, a young chief from an enemy tribe, sees her, and the two fall in love. He pretends to be the war god but the ruse is discovered, so her tribe attacks the other tribe. Then Mara persuades both tribes of the benefit of a peaceful alliance through marriage.

== Cast ==
- Ngawaara Kereti as Mara
- Ben Biddle as Manui
