= Harrington Reynolds =

English actor (1886–1961)

- Born: Edward Harrington Reynolds; 25 October 1886; Cheshire, England
- Died: 24 November 1961 (aged 75); Chapala, Jalisco, Mexico
- Occupation: Actor

Harrington Reynolds was an English actor who appeared on stage and in a number of movies. He was best known for Old English (1930), Ride 'em, Cowgirl (1939) and Two Sinners (1935).

He started his own drama company.
