= Rudall Hayward =

New Zealand filmmaker (1900–1974)

Rudall Hayward MBE
- Born: Rudall Charles Victor Hayward; 4 July 1900; Wolverhampton, Staffordshire, England
- Died: 29 May 1974 (aged 73); Dunedin, New Zealand
- Education: Wanganui Collegiate School; Waihi School of Mines
- Occupations: Film director and producer
- Years active: 1920–74
- Notable work: The Amazing Dolphin of Opononi (1956); To Love a Maori (1972)
- Spouse(s): Hilda Hayward (1923–43); Patricia Rongomaitara Te Miha, aka Patricia Miller (1943–74)

Rudall Charles Victor Hayward (4 July 1900 – 29 May 1974) was a pioneer New Zealand filmmaker from the 1920s to the 1970s, who directed seven feature films and numerous others.

== Biography ==
Hayward was born in Wolverhampton, England, and died in Dunedin while promoting his last film.

He was the son of Rudall and Adelina Hayward, who came to New Zealand in 1905. With Henry John Hayward (1866–1945) Rudall senior's brother, his parents were involved with entertainment and silent cinema in New Zealand, in West's Pictures and "The Brescians", a family of variety performers.

Rudall (junior) was educated at Wanganui Collegiate School from 1916 to 1917 and the Waihi School of Mines. He worked in Australia c. 1920 under Raymond Longford (who in 1915–16 was filming in New Zealand), on some of Longford's films: The Sentimental Bloke, On Our Selection, and Rud's New Selection.

He made his first two-reel comedy The Bloke from Freeman's Bay in 1920 (which his uncle Henry offered him £50 to burn). He was prosecuted by the Auckland City Council in the Police Court and fined £1 on each of two charges for putting up posters for The Bloke from Freeman's Bay in unauthorised places contrary to city by-laws, in October 1921.

His first feature was My Lady of the Cave (1922). In 1923 he married Hilda Moren and she worked with him on his later projects as an editor and producer: Rewi's Last Stand (1925), The Te Kooti Trail (1927), and The Bush Cinderella (1928).

In 1928–30 the couple made 23 two-reel "community comedies" with local settings and actors at various towns, and titles like: Tilly of Te Aroha, Hamilton’s Hectic Husbands, A Daughter of Dunedin, Winifred of Wanganui, Natalie of Napier, and Patsy of Palmerston. Lee Hill worked with Hayward on these, then went into competition with him.

His first sound film was On the Friendly Road (1936) with Colin Scrimgeour, and he remade Rewi's Last Stand with sound (1939). In 1943 he married the star of the movie, Ramai Te Miha.

His films were made on a shoestring budget, and in an interview from 1961 Hayward explains, "We had a sound camera which I built up with the help of friends who had lathes. Other parts I had made by Auckland companies, and I laboriously paid off the cost because no one was earning very much. We had a sound engineer, Jack Baxendale, a brilliant pioneering ham radio enthusiast, and he built not only the recording side but also the microphones. It was a major task for anyone to build condenser microphones in those days."

After World War II he worked in England, then made his most successful film The Amazing Dolphin of Opononi about Opo the dolphin. He made educational films in New Zealand and overseas, then his final film To Love a Maori (1972), which was shot on 16 mm.

In the 1973 Queen's Birthday Honours, Hayward was appointed a Member of the Order of the British Empire, for services to the community.
