= Rewi's Last Stand =

1925 film

- Directed by: Rudall Hayward
- Written by: Rudall Hayward
- Starring: Charles Alexis; Nola Casselli; Wightman McCombe
- Release date: 30 July 1925
- Country: New Zealand
- Language: English

Rewi's Last Stand is the title of two feature films written and directed by pioneering New Zealand filmmaker Rudall Hayward: a 1925 silent movie, and a 1940 remake with sound. They are historical dramas, based on the last stand of Rewi Maniapoto at the Battle of Ōrākau.

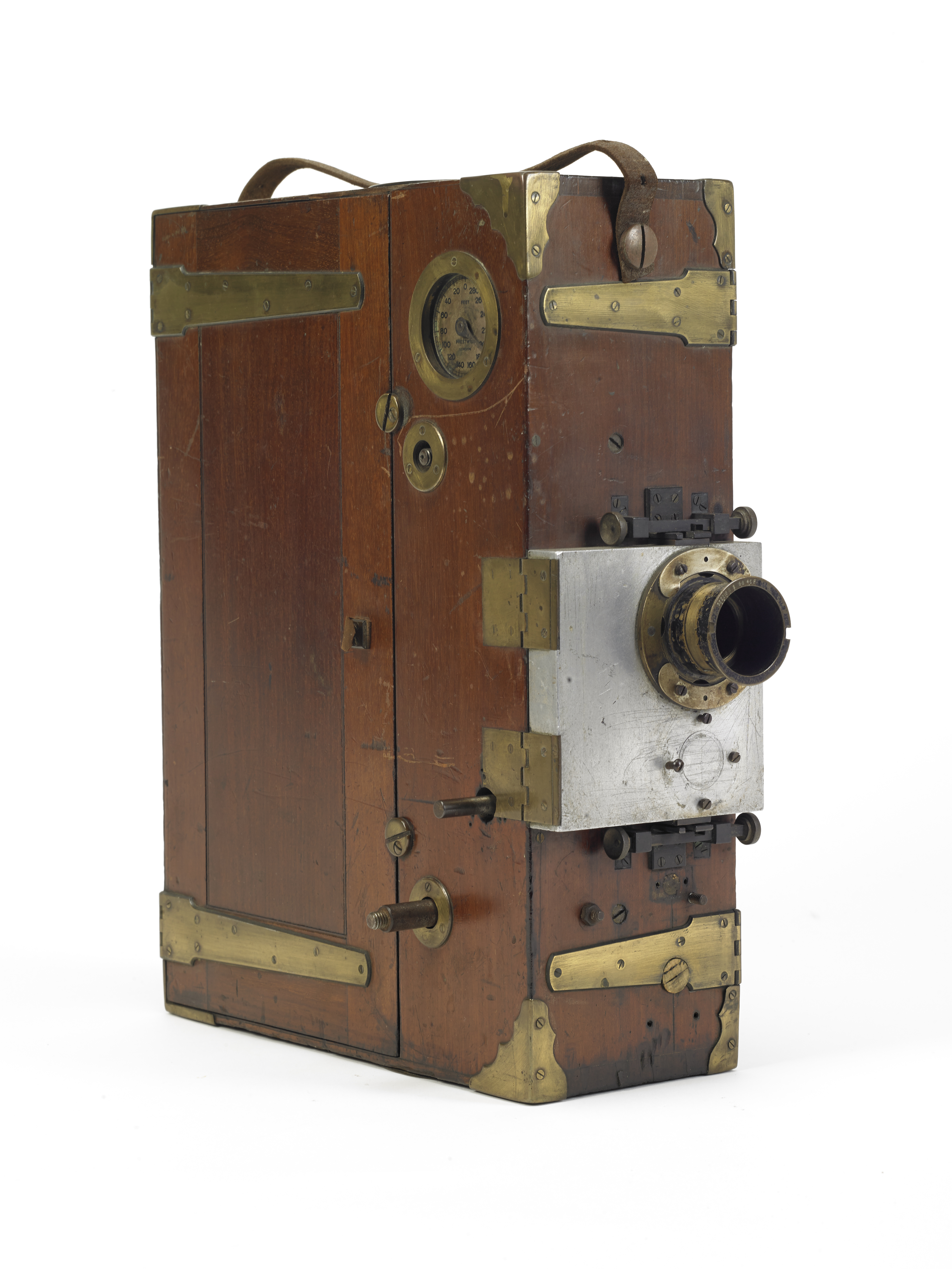
The camera used to film Rewi's Last Stand

Hayward believed that New Zealand's history offered material as dramatic as any Hollywood western. He set out to make films involving conflicts between Māori and Pākehā "while there were still people alive" who remembered the period accurately.

== 1940 Remake ==
Rewi's Last Stand
- Directed by: Rudall Hayward
- Written by: Rudall Hayward
- Starring: Ramai Te Miha; Leo Pilcher; Stanley Knight
- Distributed by: Frontier Films Ltd
- Release date: 1940
- Running time: 64 min
- Country: New Zealand
- Language: English

In 1940 Rudall Hayward remade his second feature on a more ambitious scale, this time with sound. He cast his future wife Ramai Hayward in the romantic lead.

The 1940 remake was released in a shortened version in the United Kingdom, as The Last Stand. The shortened version is the only one surviving.
