= Wild Man (film) =

1977 New Zealand comedy film

- Directed by: Geoff Murphy
- Written by: Geoff Murphy; Ian Watkin; Martyn Sanderson; Bruno Lawrence
- Produced by: Roy Murphy; Bruno Lawrence
- Starring: Bruno Lawrence; Ian Watkin; Tony Barry
- Cinematography: Alun Bollinger
- Edited by: Ross Chambers
- Music by: Blerta
- Production company: Acme Sausage Company
- Release date: 1977
- Running time: 73 minutes
- Country: New Zealand
- Language: English
- Budget: $55,000
- Box office: $100,000

Wild Man is a 1977 New Zealand action comedy film, starring Bruno Lawrence, Ian Watkin and Tony Barry. It was written and directed by Geoff Murphy.

The film is set in South Island during the late 19th century. It depicts the lives of a duo of con artists.

== Synopsis ==
The Wild Man and the Colonel are two itinerant con men who operate on the West Coast gold mining towns of the New Zealand South Island during the latter part of the nineteenth century.

== Cast ==
- Bruno Lawrence as Wild Man
- Ian Watkin as The Colonel
- Tony Barry as Dombey Morgan
- Bill Stalker as Willie Masters
- Martyn Sanderson as Snake
- Patrick Bleakley as Idiot
- Val Murphy as Molly
- John Clarke as Dr. Frederick Z. Daggenheimer
- Lyn Brookwhite as Cronin
- John Charles as Pianist
- Sue Bollinger as Lady in Bath
- Karl Bollinger as Snakes Mate
- Charlie as Snakes Mate
- Bill Gruar as Snakes Mate
- Ron Highfield as Snakes Mate
- Bernie Grice as Bald Man
- Geoff Murphy as Printer
- Ian Clements as Miner
- Phillip Gordon as Miner
- Ian Miles as Miner
- John Miles as Miner
- Victor Moir as Miner
- Roger Brooks as Butcher
- John Galvin as Drunk
- Mick Liber as Drunk
- John Bach as Barman
- Ross Smith as Barman
- Bill Marks as Horseman
- Maggie Brookwhite as Lady on Balcony
- Dylan Hazlehurst as Kid
- Melissa Lawrence as Kid
- Linus Murphy as Kid
- Miles Murphy as Kid
- Nicky Sanderson as Kid
- Jed Smith as Kid

== Production ==
The original production cost was $25,000 on 16mm for television, but then another $30,000 was spent converting it to 35mm for cinema release.

== Reviews ==
- 1977 The Press Wild man attacks TV viewers.
- 1994 Cinema Papers New Zealand Supplement.
