= Blerta Revisited =

2001 New Zealand documentary film

- Directed by: Geoff Murphy
- Written by: Paul Sutorius; Martyn Sanderson
- Produced by: Geoff Murphy; Barrie Everard
- Starring: Bruno Lawrence; Ian Watkin
- Cinematography: Warrick Attewell
- Edited by: Rongotai Lomas
- Music by: Blerta
- Release date: 2001
- Running time: 81 minutes
- Country: New Zealand
- Language: English

Blerta Revisited is a 2001 New Zealand documentary starring Bruno Lawrence and Ian Watkin. It was directed by Geoff Murphy.

== Synopsis ==
This is a collection of comedy skits, musical interludes and films from the Blerta archives. BLERTA was the 'Bruno Lawrence Electric Revelation and Travelling Apparition'.

== Cast ==
- Bruno Lawrence
- John Clarke
- Martyn Sanderson
- Ian Watkin

== Production ==
The production includes archive footage of Bruno Lawrence who had died in 1995. Extracts were taken from a 1976 six part series.

== Reviews ==
The film was screened at the New Zealand International Film Festival in 2001.
