= Inside Straight =

Inside Straight may refer to:

- A type of poker hand
- Inside Straight (album), an album by jazz saxophonist Cannonball Adderley
- Inside Straight, the first book in the "next-generation Wild Cards triad", edited by George R. R. Martin
- "Inside Straight", a song from the 1989 album Naked City by John Zorn
- Inside Straight (film), a 1951 film starring Mercedes McCambridge
- "Inside Straight", a 1955 science fiction short story by Poul Anderson
- Inside Straight (TV series), a 1984 New Zealand TV series
- Inside Straight, a jazz quintet led by Christian McBride formed in 2009
