= Oscar and Friends =

- Genre: Adventure; Animated; Fantasy
- Created by: Cameron Chittock
- Written by: Steve Ballantyne; Cameron Chittock; Kate Guthrie; Kerry Jimson; Duncan Smith; Jeffrey Thomas; Kate Ward
- Voices of: Drew Neemia; John Smythe; Ann Pacey; Callie Blood; Peter Hambleton; Tungia Baker; Rose Bollinger
- Opening theme: Oscar and Friends Theme Song
- Composer: Peter Haeder
- Country of origin: New Zealand
- Original language: English
- No. of seasons: 1
- No. of episodes: 26

Production
- Producer: Sue Hardy
- Running time: 5 minutes
- Production company: Gnome Productions Ltd.

Original release
- Network: TV3
- Release: 30 December 1995 – 20 January 1996

Oscar and Friends is a New Zealand children's stop motion animated television series that aired from 1995 to 1996. The series was produced by Gnome Productions Ltd., distributed by Southern Star Sales, and funded by NZ On Air and Southern Star Entertainment. Oscar and Friends has been screened all around the world including the UK (ITV) (where the series rated number ten for kids in its first year of release), The United States (Fox Family), Australia (ABC), Taiwan (YoYo TV), Germany (Kabel 1 in Bim Bam Bino), South Africa (M-Net), Argentina (Magic Kids) and Brazil (TV Cultura).

== Synopsis ==
The show follows a 7-year-old boy named Oscar who embarks on a series of adventures with his imaginary friends. These include Bugsy, a green, bug-eyed character, and Doris, a pig girl who serves as Oscar’s confidante; together, they assist him in various situations.

== Production ==
Cameron Chittock decided to start making his own television programs after years of working for the TV3 Network in New Zealand. He came up with the basic concept for a show about a young boy who was bored on his own at home. When his two imaginary friends appear, they take the boy off on an adventure into a fantasy world. Initially, the idea was conceptualized as a live action show using Chittock's background in puppetry and SFX to create the imaginary characters and fantastic settings. However, monetary issues became apparent as a series based on this approach became budgeted. Chittock realised it was simply not financially viable to produce the TV show in this manner. He then began to experiment with stop frame animation and saw the possibilities of using this medium to produce the action-adventure series. He turned to his friend, and award winning animation director, Euan Frizzell at Gnome Productions for support. They jointly applied for funding and were successful in gaining the finance required from NZ On Air in New Zealand to produce the show. Executive producer Shaun Bell brought Southern Star Sales on board to distribute the series, and invest into the production which allowed the 13 × 7 minutes episodes to grow into 26 × 5 minutes episodes, which the distributor believed would better meet international format requirements.

Although Chittock and a small group of technicians in New Zealand had gained some experience in clay-mation techniques up to that point, he still felt the crew required further training. He traveled to the UK and met up with Aardman animation director Richard Starzak (aka Richard Goleszowski, who was the creator of the Aardman production Rex the Runt and director of the claymation series Creature Comforts). Starzak agreed to come back with Chittock to New Zealand to help train the Oscar and Friends animating crew. The input from both Starzak and Australian stop frame animator Norman Yeend proved immensely helpful, and enabled the New Zealand team to produce the high quality results that Chittock felt necessary to ensure the series would hold up against international competition. Chittock and his crew went on to successfully complete the series, and in the process set up a small claymation industry within New Zealand.

Chittock experimented with a mixed media approach, because he wanted to create a fresh new look to the show. The joint use of painted backgrounds and stop frame model characters give the show a unique appeal. The puppet characters were constructed using a simple wire armature held together with a brass section socket system. The bodies were made using foam latex with resin cast heads. Replacement mouths were used to create the illusion of speech and facial expression.

Some of the animation was completed on a rostrum shooting the painted backgrounds and puppet characters together while other shots were completed using a traditional model set or against a blue screen. The series was shot on 35 mm film using five hand made stop frame cameras built by SFX technician Stephen Greenwood. The cameras used Nikon still lenses. With a built in video split the animators used a computer and simple line test software to help guide them through the animation process.

== Cast ==
- Drew Neemia as Oscar
- John Smythe as Bugsy
- Ann Pacey as Doris
- Callie Blood as Oscar's mother
- Peter Hambleton as Oscar's father
- Tungia Baker as Nanny Aroha
- Rose Bollinger as Rosie

== Episodes ==
This is a list of the 27 episodes made. The show screened earlier than these dates in a number of countries.

=== Season 1 (1995–1996) ===
1. Oscar Takes Off
2. Oscar Goes Flying
3. One Day at the Dump
4. The Time Machine
5. Skullduggery
6. Oscar and the Rustlers
7. Oscar to the Rescue
8. Oscar and the Pirates
9. Up, Up and Away
10. The Magic Carpet

=== Season 2 (1996) ===
1. The Frog Princess
2. Feed Me
3. Chocolate Meltdown
4. Eel King
5. Oscar and the Runaway Roller
6. A Dog's Life
7. Oscar and the Haunted House
8. 20,000 Leagues Under the Rock Pools
9. Plastic Jurassic
10. Voyage to the Bottom of the S-Bend

=== Season 3 (1996) ===
1. Starstruck
2. Championship Ball
3. Oscar and the Castle Kingdom
4. Diamond Danger
5. Oscar and the Sandman
6. Clowning Around
