= Bill Stalker =

New Zealand actor

- Stalker (right) as Peter Fanelli in Skyways
- Born: William Robert Stalker; 3 August 1948; Masterton, New Zealand
- Died: 28 November 1981 (aged 33); Melbourne, Victoria, Australia
- Education: University of Canterbury
- Occupation: Actor
- Known for: Skyways; Cop Shop
- Spouse: Donna Boyd-Wilson (div.)
- Partner(s): Beverly Jean Morrison; Catherine Wilkin
- Children: 4

William Robert Stalker (3 August 1948 – 28 November 1981) was a New Zealand actor, known for his roles in television, both in his native country and Australia.

== Early life ==
Stalker was born in Masterton, New Zealand, the second of seven children to Robert and Zena Stalker. He and grew up in Hawke's Bay, and lived in both Dannevirke and Pōkawa, near Hastings, before attending the University of Canterbury, where he graduated with a Bachelor of Arts. During his studies, he became involved in theatre as an actor and director with the Canterbury University Drama Society and the Court Theatre.

== Career ==
One of Stalker's earliest acting roles was as a biker in the New Zealand television series Pukemanu, which also starred Ginette McDonald. In 1971, he joined Bruno Lawrence's musical and theatrical co-operative Blerta, where he performed with many popular New Zealand entertainers. He left the group after one tour in 1972, but returned in 1975 until the group disbanded in 1976.

In 1974, Stalker played the title role of good-natured but inept policeman Percy in short-lived unaired children's series Percy the Policeman. The New Zealand Broadcasting Corporation refused to broadcast the show, concerned that it ridiculed the police. He then began a regular role in soap opera Close to Home. In 1977, he appeared in the New Zealand action comedy film Wild Man.

Shortly thereafter, Stalker moved to Australia in 1979 and joined the original main cast of airport drama serial Skyways, as Peter Fanelli, head of airport security and ex-cop. Fanelli soon proved to be one of the show's most popular characters, and when Skyways was cancelled in 1981, the character was quickly moved to the police serial Cop Shop, with Fanelli re-entering the police force, heading Riverside CIB as a Detective Sergeant.

After nine months with Cop Shop, Stalker was tired of both working in serials and of playing Fanelli, and quit the show to explore various film offers. His character's wedding to Yvonne Holmes (Annette Andre) wrapped up his storyline, with the wedding episode airing in April 1982, after Stalker's death.

== Personal life ==
Stalker was married to Donna Boyd-Wilson, but the couple later divorced.

During his time performing as part of Blerta, Stalker met jazz singer Beverly Jean Morrison (who went by the professional name of Beaver) and together they had two daughters, Fritha and Kate Stalker. By September 1977, the pair had separated, but remained close friends.

Stalker also had two other older children, Eleanor and Greg Carr, twins, who were adopted out as babies. He had been in the process of searching for the twins shortly before his death.

== Death ==
On 28 November 1981, during a weekend break between taping his final scenes for Cop Shop, Stalker was killed when his motorcycle slid and collided with a car in wet weather in Toorak, Victoria. His pillion passenger, then-girlfriend, New Zealand born actress Catherine Wilkin, suffered a fractured hip and leg injuries in the accident.

A dedication to Stalker was shown at the end of his final Cop Shop episode.

== Filmography ==
Year	Title	Role	Notes	Ref.
1971	Pukemanu	Chief Biker	1 episode	
1974	The Longest Winter			
1974	Percy the Policeman	Percy	5 episodes	
1975–1979	Close to Home	Alan / Alex		
1977	The Governor	Various characters	1 episode	
1977	Wild Man	Willie Masters	Film	
1978	The Les Deverett Variety Hour	Various characters	1 episode	
1979–1981	Skyways	Peter Fanelli	141 episodes	
1981–1982	Cop Shop	Detective Sergeant Peter Fanelli	62 episodes	
