= The Leading Edge (film) =

1987 New Zealand skiing film

- Directed by: Michael Firth
- Written by: Michael Firth; Grant Morris
- Produced by: Barry Everard
- Starring: Mathurin Molgat; Bruce Grant
- Cinematography: Stuart Dryburgh
- Edited by: Patrick Monaghan
- Release date: 21 August 1987
- Running time: 72 minutes
- Country: New Zealand
- Language: English

The Leading Edge is a 1987 New Zealand skiing film directed by Michael Firth. It was a followup to his 1976 film Off the Edge. The film featured the 1986 Alpine Ironman and filming commenced in September that year. The cast included multiple top New Zealand ski racers.

== Synopsis ==
Mike is hitchhiking and skiing around New Zealand. He meets up with others who join him to compete in the Alpine Ironman.

== Cast ==
- Mathurin Molgat as Matt
- Bruce Grant as Bruce
- Evan Bloomfield as Evan
- Mark Whetu as Mark
- Christine Grant as Christine
- Melanie Forbes as Melanie
- Billy T. James as Pilot

== Reception ==
Variety said "Firth's ski adventure II does not pretend to be a study of individual character and motivation. It is mostly clean and totally wholesome entertainment in the healtheries wonderland of clean air, nuclear-free New Zealand. While this injects little tension and sense of danger to Matt's exploits, there are, nonetheless, some great action sequences and impeccable photography (by Stuart Dryburgh)." Bryan Senn in his book Ski Films: A Comprehensive Guide wrote "As a general movie, given its simplistic story, callow characterizations, and average acting, The Leading Edge was never in danger of mounting those Oscar podium steps. But as a ski film, it damn near earns a Lifetime Achievement Award."
