= Eleanor David =

English actress

Eleanor M. David
- Born: September 1954 (age 72); UK
- Occupation: Actress
- Years active: 1981–present

Eleanor M. David (born September 1954) is a British actress who has worked on projects in the UK, the US and New Zealand. She won positive reviews for her starring role in the biopic Sylvia, in which she played pioneering educator Sylvia Ashton-Warner.

== Life and career ==
David has appeared in several films and television programmes. Her work includes BAFTA-nominated comedy Comfort and Joy directed by Bill Forsyth, mini-series Paradise Postponed, Mike Leigh's Topsy-Turvy and Alan Parker's film of Pink Floyd The Wall, in which she played the wife of the main character.

In 1984, David travelled to New Zealand to star as Sylvia Ashton-Warner in the biopic Sylvia. Reviewing her performance, Janet Maslin of The New York Times commented: "Miss David bears a striking resemblance to the real woman and gives an intelligent, compassionate performance, limited only by the uncomplicated reverence with which the film makers regard their heroine." Village Voice critic Andrew Sarris praised the four principal actors and named Sylvia one of the ten best films of 1985.

== Filmography ==
- The Scarlet Pimpernel (1982) – Louise
- Oliver Twist (1982) – Rose Maylie
- Pink Floyd The Wall (1982) – Pink's wife
- Comfort and Joy (1984) – Maddy
- Sylvia (1985) – Sylvia Ashton-Warner
- 84 Charing Cross Road (1987) – Cecily Farr
- The Wolves of Willoughby Chase (1989) – Lady Willoughby
- Slipstream (1989) – Ariel
- Ladder of Swords (1989)
- White Hunter Black Heart (1990) – Dorshka Zibelinsky
- The King's Whore (1990) – La Reine
- Topsy-Turvy (1999) – Fanny Ronalds
- House of Boys (2009) – Emma

== Television credits ==
- The Professionals (TV series) episode Fugitive, 1980.
- The Borgias (1981, TV Mini-Series) – Sancia
- Reilly: Ace of Spies (1984, TV Mini-Series) – Eugenie
- Shroud for a Nightingale (1984, TV Mini-Series) – Jo Fallon
- The Return of Sherlock Holmes (1986) – Mrs St Clair in "The Man with the Twisted Lip"
- Paradise Postponed (1986, TV Mini-Series) – Agnes Simcox / Agnes Salter
- Lovejoy (1992) – Katriona Brooksby
- Rumpole of the Bailey (1992) – Elizabeth Casterini
- Ruth Rendell Mysteries (1993) – Alice Fielding in "Vanity Dies Hard"
- Between the Lines (1993) – Penny Shaw
- Drop the Dead Donkey (1993) – Lady Caroline
- The Inspector Alleyn Mysteries (1994) – Margaret Ballantyne in "Dead Water"
- Midsomer Murders (2001) – Georgina Canning in "Tainted Fruit"
- The Last Detective (2002) – Tricia Lloyd
- The Rotters Club (2005) – Ursula Boyd
- Sherlock Holmes and the Case of the Silk Stocking (2004) – Mary Pentney
- Playhouse Presents (2013) – Kathleen
