= Alison Routledge =

New Zealand actress

- Born: 29 April 1960 (age 66); United Kingdom
- Education: Victoria University of Wellington; Toi Whakaari: New Zealand Drama School (1982)
- Occupation: Actress
- Years active: 1980–2004
- Known for: The Quiet Earth (1980); Bridge to Nowhere (1986)

Alison Mary Stuart Routledge (born 29 April 1960) is a New Zealand actress, known for her performance as Joanne in the 1985 cult film The Quiet Earth.

== Early life ==
Born to an English army officer, Routledge moved to New Zealand as a teenager. She received a Bachelor of Arts majoring in German from Victoria University in Wellington where she first began acting. Her first role was the lead in a stage production of Pirandello’s Six Characters in Search of an Author.

After winning a place at Toi Whakaari: New Zealand Drama School on a dare, she graduated in 1982 with a Diploma in Acting.

== Career ==
After graduating from drama school, Routledge landed the lead role of Laura in 1983 television film The Garden Party, based on Katherine Mansfield’s short story. This led to further television work, a stint in Theatre Corporate’s 'Theatre In Education' program, and a minor role in 1984 feature film Other Halves.

Routledge came to fame as Joanne in 1985 cult sci-fi film The Quiet Earth, alongside Bruno Lawrence, for which she was nominated for a Best Actress award. The following year, she appeared opposite Lawrence once more in thriller Bridge to Nowhere, seeing her nominated for a Best Supporting Actress award.

Routledge also had roles in the films The Returning (1990) and Rain (2001). She played deluded mother Heather in 2005 short film Nothing Special.

Routledge worked as a presenter on 1980s children's nature series Wildtrack. She has also appeared in television commercials, radio dramas, and has performed as a country, western and blues singer.

== Awards ==
Year	Work	Award	Category	Result	Ref.
1987	The Quiet Earth	GOFTA Film and Television Awards	Best Female Performance in a Leading Role – Film	Nominated	
1987	Bridge to Nowhere	GOFTA Film and Television Awards	Best Female Performance in a Leading Role – Film	Nominated	

== Filmography ==
=== Film ===
Year	Title	Role	Notes	Ref.
1980	Don't Rubbish It	Daughter	Short film	
1984	Other Halves	Paula		
1985	The Quiet Earth	Joanne		
1986	Bridge to Nowhere	Lise		
1990	The Returning	Jessica		
1992	The Palm Reader	Shirley	Short film	
2001	Rain	Heather		
2001	Her Majesty	Victoria Wakefield		
2005	Nothing Special	Heather	Short film	

=== Television ===
Year	Title	Role	Note	Ref.
1980–1984	Mortimer's Patch	Various characters		
1981–1991	Wildtrack	Presenter		
1983	The Garden Party	Laura		
1987–1990	Gloss	Leah		
1989–1990	Laugh INZ	Various characters		
1992	Homeward Bound	Charlie		
2000–2001	The Life & Times of Te Tutu	Mrs Vole		
