= List of Academy Award winners and nominees from New Zealand =

This is a list of New Zealand Academy Award winners and nominees.

== Technical Achievement Award ==
Year	Name	Status	Milestone/Notes
2025	Andrew van Straten	Won	Academy of Motion Picture Arts and Sciences, Technical Achievement Award for the design and development of Ziva VFX., a system for constructing and simulating muscles, fat, fascia, and skin for digital characters. Andrew is from Nelson.

== Best Actor ==
Best Leading Actor
Year	Name	Film	Status	Milestone / Notes
1999	Russell Crowe	The Insider	Nominated	Crowe was born in New Zealand, but has lived in Australia since his childhood.
2000	Russell Crowe	Gladiator	Won	
2001	Russell Crowe	A Beautiful Mind	Nominated	

== Best Actress ==
Best Leading Actress
Year	Name	Film	Status	Milestone / Notes
2003	Keisha Castle-Hughes	Whale Rider	Nominated	Debut performance. First indigenous person (Māori) ever nominated in this category. Second youngest nominee (age 13) ever in this category.

== Best Supporting Actress ==
Best Supporting Actress
Year	Name	Film	Status	Milestone / Notes
1993	Anna Paquin	The Piano	Won	Dual New Zealand-Canadian citizen. Debut performance. Second youngest winner (age 11) in Academy Award history.

== Best Animated Short Film ==
Best Animated Short Film
Year	Name	Film	Status	Milestone / Notes
1986	Bob Stenhouse	The Frog, the Dog and the Devil	Nominated	New Zealand-made film made by the National Film Unit
1994	Erica Russell	Triangle	Nominated	

== Best Animated Film ==
Best Animated Feature
Year	Name	Film	Status	Milestone / Notes
2004	Andrew Adamson	Shrek 2	Nominated	

== Best Costume Design ==
Best Costume Design
Year	Name	Film	Status	Milestone / Notes
2001	Ngila Dickson; Richard Taylor	The Lord of the Rings: The Fellowship of the Ring	Nominated	
2003	Ngila Dickson; Richard Taylor	The Lord of the Rings: The Return of the King	Won	First time that featured two New Zealanders costume designers in the Best Costume Design category (in different nominations) within the same year.
2003	Ngila Dickson	The Last Samurai	Nominated	First time that featured two New Zealanders costume designers in the Best Costume Design category (in different nominations) within the same year.
2025	Kate Hawley	Frankenstein	Won	

== Best Director ==
Best Director
Year	Name	Film	Status	Milestone / Notes
1993	Jane Campion	The Piano	Nominated	Second woman ever to be nominated in this category.
1997	James Cameron	Titanic	Won	James Cameron is a Canadian born filmmaker who obtained New Zealand citizenship in 2025.
2001	Peter Jackson	The Lord of the Rings: The Fellowship of the Ring	Nominated	
2003	Peter Jackson	The Lord of the Rings: The Return of the King	Won	
2009	James Cameron	Avatar	Nominated	
2021	Jane Campion	The Power of the Dog	Won	First woman ever to be nominated twice in this category.

== Best Documentary Feature Film ==
Documentary (Feature)
Year	Name	Film	Status	Milestone / Notes
1977	Michael Firth	Off the Edge	Nominated	

== Best Film Editing ==
Best Film Editing
Year	Name	Film	Status	Milestone / Notes
1997	James Cameron	Titanic	Won	Shared with Conrad Buff IV and Richard A. Harris
2001	John Gilbert	The Lord of the Rings: The Fellowship of the Ring	Nominated	
2002	Michael Horton	The Lord of the Rings: The Two Towers	Nominated	
2003	Jamie Selkirk	The Lord of the Rings: The Return of the King	Won	
2009	James Cameron	Avatar	Nominated	Shared with Stephen E. Rivkin and John Refoua
2016	John Gilbert	Hacksaw Ridge	Won	
2019	Tom Eagles	Jojo Rabbit	Nominated	

== Best Makeup and Hairstyling ==
Best Makeup and Hairstyling
Year	Name	Film	Status	Milestone / Notes
2001	Richard Taylor	The Lord of the Rings: The Fellowship of the Ring	Won	Shared with Peter Owen.
2003	Richard Taylor	The Lord of the Rings: The Return of the King	Won	Shared with Peter King.
2015	Lesley Vanderwalt	Mad Max: Fury Road	Won	New Zealand-born Australian citizen. Shared with Elka Wardega and Damian Martin.

== Best Original Song ==
Best Original Song
Year	Name	Film	Song	Status	Milestone / Notes
2003	Fran Walsh	The Return of the King	"Into the West"	Won	Shared with Annie Lennox and Howard Shore.
2011	Bret McKenzie	The Muppets	"Man or Muppet"	Won	

== Best Picture ==
Best Picture
Year	Name	Film	Status	Milestone / Notes
1997	James Cameron	Titanic	Won	Shared with Jon Landau.
1998	Tim Bevan	Elizabeth	Nominated	New Zealand-born British producer. Shared with Alison Owen and Eric Fellner.
2001	Peter Jackson; Fran Walsh	The Lord of the Rings: The Fellowship of the Ring	Nominated	Shared with Barrie M. Osborne.
2002	Peter Jackson; Fran Walsh	The Lord of the Rings: The Two Towers	Nominated	Shared with Barrie M. Osborne.
2003	Peter Jackson; Fran Walsh	The Lord of the Rings: The Return of the King	Won	Shared with Barrie M. Osborne.
2007	Tim Bevan	Atonement	Nominated	Shared with Eric Fellner and Paul Webster.
2009	James Cameron	Avatar	Nominated	Shared with Jon Landau.
2009	Peter Jackson	District 9	Nominated	Shared with Carolynne Cunningham.
2012	Tim Bevan	Les Misérables	Nominated	Shared with Eric Fellner, Debra Hayward, and Cameron Mackintosh.
2014	Tim Bevan; Anthony McCarten	The Theory of Everything	Nominated	Shared with Lisa Bruce and Eric Fellner.
2017	Tim Bevan; Anthony McCarten	Darkest Hour	Nominated	Shared with Lisa Bruce, Eric Fellner, and Douglas Urbanski.
2019	Carthew Neal; Taika Waititi; Chelsea Winstanley	Jojo Rabbit	Nominated	
2021	Jane Campion	The Power of the Dog	Nominated	Shared with Tanya Seghatchian, Emile Sherman, Iain Canning, and Roger Frappier
2022	James Cameron	Avatar: The Way of Water	Nominated	Shared with Jon Landau.

== Best Production Design ==
Best Production Design
Year	Name	Film	Status	Milestone / Notes
2001	Grant Major; Dan Hennah	The Lord of the Rings: The Fellowship of the Ring	Nominated	
2002	Grant Major; Dan Hennah	The Lord of the Rings: The Two Towers	Nominated	Shared with Alan Lee.
2003	Grant Major; Dan Hennah	The Lord of the Rings: The Return of the King	Won	Shared with Alan Lee.
2005	Grant Major; Dan Hennah; Simon Bright	King Kong	Nominated	
2009	Kim Sinclair	Avatar	Won	Shared with Rick Carter and Robert Stromberg.
2012	Dan Hennah; Ra Vincent; Simon Bright	The Hobbit: An Unexpected Journey	Nominated	
2019	Ra Vincent	Jojo Rabbit	Nominated	Shared with Nora Sopková.
2021	Grant Major; Amber Richards	The Power of the Dog	Nominated	

== Best Short Film - Live Action ==
Live Action Short Film
Year	Name	Film	Status	Milestone / Notes
1958	Brian Brake	Snows of Aorangi	Nominated	First New Zealand film nominated in any category.
1980	Lloyd Phillips	The Dollar Bottom	Won	First New Zealander to win in any category.
2004	Taika Waititi; Ainsley Gardiner	Two Cars, One Night	Nominated	
2014	James Lucas	The Phone Call	Won	Dual British-New Zealand citizen. Shared with Mat Kirkby.

== Best Sound Editing ==
Sound Editing
Year	Name	Film	Status	Milestone / Notes
2002	Mike Hopkins	The Lord of the Rings: The Two Towers	Won	Shared with Ethan Van der Ryn.
2005	Mike Hopkins	King Kong	Won	Shared with Ethan Van der Ryn.
2007	Mike Hopkins	Transformers	Nominated	Shared with Ethan Van der Ryn.
2013	Brent Burge; Chris Ward	The Hobbit: The Desolation of Smaug	Nominated	
2014	Brent Burge	The Hobbit: The Battle of the Five Armies	Nominated	Shared with Jason Canovas.

== Best Sound Mixing ==
Best Sound Mixing
Year	Name	Film	Status	Milestone / Notes
2001	Gethin Creagh; Hammond Peek	The Lord of the Rings: The Fellowship of the Ring	Nominated	Shared with Christopher Boyes, and Michael Semanick.
2002	Michael Hedges; Hammond Peek	The Lord of the Rings: The Two Towers	Nominated	Shared with Christopher Boyes, and Michael Semanick.
2003	Michael Hedges; Hammond Peek	The Lord of the Rings: The Return of the King	Won	Shared with Christopher Boyes, and Michael Semanick.
2005	Michael Hedges; Hammond Peek	King Kong	Won	Shared with Christopher Boyes, and Michael Semanick.
2005	Tony Johnson	The Chronicles of Narnia: The Lion, the Witch and the Wardrobe	Nominated	Shared with Terry Porter, and Dean A. Zupancic.
2009	Tony Johnson	Avatar	Nominated	Shared with Christopher Boyes, Gary Summers, and Andy Nelson.
2013	Michael Hedges; Tony Johnson	The Hobbit: The Desolation of Smaug	Nominated	Shared with Christopher Boyes, and Michael Semanick.

== Best Visual Effects ==
Best Visual Effects
Year	Name	Film	Status	Milestone / Notes
2001	Richard Taylor	The Lord of the Rings: The Fellowship of the Ring	Won	Shared with Jim Rygiel, Randall William Cook, and Mark Stetson.
2005	Christian Rivers; Richard Taylor	King Kong	Won	Shared with Joe Letteri, and Brian Van't Hul.
2009	Matt Aitken	District 9	Nominated	Shared with Dan Kaufman, Peter Muyzers and Robert Habros
2011	Dan Lemmon	Rise of the Planet of the Apes	Nominated	Shared with Joe Letteri, R. Christopher White and Daniel Barrett.
2014	Dan Lemmon	Dawn of the Planet of the Apes	Nominated	Shared with Joe Letteri, Daniel Barrett, and Erik Winquist.
2016	Dan Lemmon	The Jungle Book	Won	Shared with Robert Legato, Adam Valdez, and Andrew R. Jones.
2017	Dan Lemmon	War for the Planet of the Apes	Nominated	Shared with Joe Letteri, Daniel Barrett, and Joel Whist.
2019	Matt Aitken	Avengers: Endgame	Nominated	Shared with Dan DeLeeuw, Russell Earl, and Dan Sudick.
2020	David Lee	Tenet	Won	Shared with Andrew Jackson, Andrew Lockley, and Scott Fisher.
2021	Sean Noel Walker	Shang-Chi and the Legend of the Ten Rings	Nominated	Shared with Joe Farrell, Dan Oliver, and Christopher Townsend.

== Best Writing – Adapted Screenplay ==
Best Adapted Screenplay
Year	Name	Film	Source Material	Status	Milestone / Notes
1980	Jonathan Hardy	Breaker Morant	The play Breaker Morant by Kenneth G. Ross	Nominated	Shared with David Stevens and Bruce Beresford.
2001	Philippa Boyens; Peter Jackson; Fran Walsh	The Fellowship of the Ring	The novel The Fellowship of the Ring by J. R. R. Tolkien	Nominated	
2003	Philippa Boyens; Peter Jackson; Fran Walsh	The Return of the King	The novel The Return of the King by J. R. R. Tolkien	Won	
2014	Anthony McCarten	The Theory of Everything	The book Travelling to Infinity: My Life with Stephen Hawking by Jane Hawking	Nominated	
2019	Taika Waititi	Jojo Rabbit	The novel Caging Skies by Christine Leunens	Won	First indigenous person (Māori) ever to win this category. Second time that two different nominations in the same year and category were for New Zealanders.
2019	Anthony McCarten	The Two Popes	The play by Anthony McCarten	Nominated	Second time that two different nominations in the same year and category were for New Zealanders.
2021	Jane Campion	The Power of the Dog	The novel The Power of the Dog by Thomas Savage	Nominated	

== Best Writing – Original Screenplay ==
Best Original Screenplay
Year	Name	Film	Status	Milestone / Notes
1993	Jane Campion	The Piano	Won	
1994	Peter Jackson; Fran Walsh	Heavenly Creatures	Nominated	

== Nominations and Winners ==
No. of wins	No. of nominations
31	75
