= Sarah Peirse =

New Zealand actress

- Born: New Zealand
- Occupations: Actress, director
- Known for: Heavenly Creatures (1994); Rain (2001)

Sarah Peirse is a New Zealand actress who works on both screen and stage. She is best known for her roles as Honora Rieper Parker in Heavenly Creatures and as Kate in Rain.

== Early life and education ==
Sarah Peirse studied acting for a year at a drama school associated with Theatre Corporate in Auckland, alongside fellow actors Donogh Rees and Phillip Gordon.

== Career ==
Following her studies, Peirse acted in theatrical productions such as A Bear Called Paddington and Three Sisters. In 1984, after a year in London, she began directing theatre, starting with Caryl Churchill’s Top Girls at Theatre Corporate.

Peirse’s first screen role was in the 1980 short film Queen Street, followed by a main role in the TV movie A Woman of Good Character, for which she won a Feltex Best Actress award. She continued to appear in theatre, television, and film, and was nominated for an award for her role in the 1985 film Arriving Tuesday, and a Best Supporting Actress award for her role in 1988 fantasy film The Navigator.

In 1989, she spent two years with the Melbourne Theatre Company, before relocating to Sydney for nine years, followed by a three-year stint in the United Kingdom.

Peirse briefly returned to New Zealand to star in the 1994 Peter Jackson film Heavenly Creatures, alongside Kate Winslet and Melanie Lynskey, playing the role of the ill-fated Honora Rieper Parker. Jackson had admired Peirse's acting when she starred in the film A Woman of Good Character, and regarded her as the only choice for the part of Parker. Peirse also acted as drama coach for Melanie Lynskey on the film.

Peirse again returned to New Zealand, to star in the 2001 coming of age film Rain, playing the role of the disaffected, sophisticated Kate. Her performance earned her two Best Actress awards. That year, she also starred in the 2001 British TV movie Murder Rooms. Her further New Zealand credits include The Hopes & Dreams of Gazza Snell, Under the Vines, the 2011 TV movie Bliss and an award-winning turn in the TV movie Aftershock. Peirse then starred as Hilda in Peter Jackson's The Hobbit trilogy (2012–2014), as well as Dr. Gladys Bell in the American fantasy drama series Sweet Tooth (2021–2023).

Peirse's Australian TV credits include guest appearances in The Flying Doctors, Water Rats and Spirited and 1987 Australian thriller film Went Up the Hill. She featured in series such as Old School, Hunters, Seven Types of Ambiguity, Offspring, The Letdown, and Love Me.

Peirse's stage credits include a 2018 production of Melbourne Theatre Company's The Children, as well as lead roles in Cabaret, Three Sisters, A Streetcar Named Desire, and Molly Sweeney. Peirse spent many years at both Theatre Corporate and the Mercury Theatre in New Zealand. where she eventually became Associate Director. She has also directed at the State Theatre Company of South Australia in Adelaide.

Peirse starred in season three of Foxtel legal drama The Twelve., which premiered on 4 August 2025. On 20 November 2025, Peirse was named in the cast for the ABC series Treasure & Dirt. She plays a tough town police sergeant, Pat Richter, in the series, which premiered in July 2026.

== Filmography ==
=== Film ===
Year	Title	Role
1980	A Woman of Good Character	Lizzie
1985	Sylvia	Vivian Wallop
1986	My Letter to George (aka Mesmerized or Shocked)	Victoria's mother
1986	Arriving Tuesday	Carol
1987	Young Detectives on Wheels	Auntie Kim
1988	The Navigator: A Medieval Odyssey	Linnet
1994	Heavenly Creatures	Honora Parker Rieper
2001	Rain	Kate
2002	Unconditional Love	Florist
2010	The Hopes & Dreams of Gazza Snell	Dr. Riebeeck
2011	Bliss: The Beginning of Katherine Mansfield	Annie Beauchamp
2013	The Hobbit: The Desolation of Smaug	Hilda Blanca
2014	The Hobbit: The Battle of the Five Armies	Hilda Blanca
2018	Mortal Engines	Dr. Twix
2022	Nude Tuesday	Felicity
2024	A Mistake	Mary, Head of Surgery
2024	Went Up the Hill	Helen
2024	Addition	

=== Television ===
Year	Title	Role	Notes	Ref
1983	It's Lizzie to Those Close	Lizzie	TV movie	
1984	Inside Straight	Libby Wilkes	1 episode	
1987	Steel Riders	Auntie Kim	1 episode	
1991	The Flying Doctors	Elizabeth Samuels	1 episode	
1996	Water Rats	Margaret Roberts	1 episode	
1996	Fable	Clarissa	TV movie	
1998	Murder Call	Harriet Fratelli	1 episode	
1999	Dog's Head Bay	Jenny Grant	3 episodes	
2001	Murder Rooms: Mysteries of the Real Sherlock Holmes	Agnes	Miniseries, 1 episode	
2008	Aftershock	Angela Flite	TV movie	
2009	City Homicide	Lucille Neades	1 episode	
2010	Spirited	Charlotte	1 episode	
2011	Bliss	Annie Beauchamp	TV movie	
2014	Old School	Margaret McCabe	8 episodes	
2014	Rake	Politicians Commissioner	1 episode	
2016	The Shannara Chronicles	Pyria Elessedil	2 episodes	
2016	Hunters	Finnerman	12 episodes	
2016–2017	Offspring	Marjorie Van Dyke	13 episodes	
2017	Seven Types of Ambiguity	Detective Staszic	Miniseries, 5 episodes	
2017–2019	The Letdown	Verity	8 episodes	
2020	Stateless	Assistant Secretary Genevieve Mundy	Miniseries, 5 episodes	
2021	Sweet Tooth	Dr. Gladys Bell	Season 1, 3 episodes	
2021–2023	Love Me	Christine Mathieson	8 episodes	
2021–2024	Under the Vines	Marissa Silverton	17 episodes	
2025	The Twelve	Beth Chaplin	Season 3: "Cape Rock Killer", 8 episodes	
2026	Treasure & Dirt	Sergeant Patricia Richter	TV series	
2026	Shakedown	Catherin Holmes AC	TV mini series	
2027	Help Me!	Barb Nelson	TV series	

== Theatre ==
=== As actor ===
Year	Title	Role	Notes	Ref
	A Streetcar Named Desire	Stella	Mercury Theatre, Auckland	
1979	Coming, Ready or Not		Centrepoint Theatre, Palmerston North	
1979	The Daughter-in-Law	Minnie	Centrepoint Theatre, Palmerston North	
1979	The Foursome	Marie	Centrepoint Theatre, Palmerston North	
1980	Nativity	Mary	Theatre Corporate, Auckland	
1980	The Stationary Sixth Form Poetry Trip	Molly	Theatre Corporate, Auckland	
1981	Who's Randy		Theatre Corporate, Auckland	
1982	Fanshen		Theatre Corporate, Auckland	
1982	Outside In	Di – Boss	Theatre Corporate, Auckland	
1984	Gulls		Theatre Corporate, Auckland	
1988	South Pacific	Nellie Forbush	Mercury Theatre, Auckland	
1989	The Secret Rapture	Katherine	Mercury Theatre, Auckland	
1990	The Heidi Chronicles	Susan	Russell St Theatre, Melbourne with MTC	
1992	The Rose Tattoo	Serafina Delle Rose	Mercury Theatre, Auckland	
1995	Dead Funny	Eleanor	Wharf Theatre, Sydney with STC	
1997	Molly Sweeney	Molly Sweeney	Fairfax Studio, Melbourne with MTC	
1998	Vita & Virginia		Maidment Theatre, Auckland	
2007	Enlightenment	Lio	Fairfax Studio, Melbourne with MTC	
2008	Madness You Can Trust		RNZ National Radio, Wellington	
2009	Poor Boy	Ruth Prior	Southbank Theatre, Melbourne with MTC / Sydney Theatre with STC	
2009	Gethsemane	Meredith	Belvoir St Theatre, Sydney	
2011	The Business	Van (Vassa)	Belvoir St Theatre, Sydney	
2012	Tribes	Beth	Southbank Theatre, Melbourne with MTC	
2012	The Gift	Sadie	ATC	
2013	Fury	Alice	Wharf Theatre, Sydney with STC	
2014	Other Desert Cities	Polly Wyeth	Maidment Theatre, Auckland with ATC	
2014–2016	Switzerland	Patricia Highsmith	Sydney Opera House, Southbank Theatre, Melbourne with STC	
2015	Endgame	Nell	STC	
2016	The Golden Age	Queenie Ayre	Wharf Theatre, Sydney with STC	
2017	Mark Colvin's Kidney	Mary-Ellen Field	Belvoir Theatre Company, Sydney	
2018	A Cheery Soul	Miss Docker	Sydney Opera House with STC	
2018	The Children	Rose	Southbank Theatre, Melbourne, Sydney Opera House with MTC / STC	
2023	Women of Troy	Hecuba	Theatre Royal, Hobart with Archipelago Productions	
2023	Switzerland	Patricia Highsmith	ABS Waterfront, Auckland	
2025	Song of First Desire	Camelia / Margarita	Belvoir St Theatre, Sydney	

=== As director ===
Year	Title	Role	Notes	Ref
1984	Top Girls	Director	Theatre Corporate, Auckland	
1984	Wednesday to Come	Director	Theatre Corporate, Auckland	
1986	The Trojan Women	Director	Auckland Domain with Public Works	
1987	Squatter	Director	Mercury Theatre, Auckland	
1987	Les Liaisons Dangereuses	Director	Mercury Theatre, Auckland	
1989	Mrs Klein	Director	Mercury Theatre, Auckland	
1991	A Delicate Balance	Director	Playhouse, Adelaide with STCSA	
1994	Someone Who'll Watch Over Me	Director	Herald Theatre, Auckland with ATC	
1995	Dancing at Lughnasa	Director	Herald Theatre, Auckland with ATC	
1997	Master Class	Director	Herald Theatre, Auckland with ATC	
2003	A Doll's House	Director	UNITEC Theatre, Auckland	
2004	The Bach	Director	Herald Theatre, Auckland with ATC	

== Awards ==
Year	Work	Award	Category	Result	Ref
1983	A Woman of Good Character (aka It's Lizzie to those Close)	Feltex Awards	Best Actress	Won	
1985	Arriving Tuesday	NZ Listener GOFTA Awards	Best Supporting Actress	Nominated	
1989	The Navigator: A Medieval Odyssey	NZ Film & TV Awards	Best Female in a Supporting Role	Won	
1995	Heavenly Creatures	NZ Film & TV Awards	Best Supporting Actress	Won	
1995	Heavenly Creatures	Chlotrudis Awards	Best Supporting Actress	Nominated	
1997	Molly Sweeney	Green Room Awards	Best Female Actor	Won	
2001	Rain	Nokia New Zealand Film Awards	Best Actress	Won	
2002	Rain	Fantasporto Festival	Best Actress – Directors’ Week Section	Won	
2003	Rain	Chlotrudis Awards	Best Supporting Actress	Nominated	
2009	Aftershock	Qantas Film & Television Awards	Best Actress – Television	Nominated	
2012	Bliss: The Beginning of Katherine Mansfield	NZ Film & Television Awards	Best Performance by a Supporting Actress	Nominated	
2014	Switzerland	Sydney Theatre Awards	Bear Actress	Won	
2015	Endgame	Helpmann Awards	Best Female Actor in a Supporting Role in a Play	Nominated	
2016	The Golden Age	Helpmann Awards	Best Female Actor in a Supporting Role in a Play	Won	
2018	Seven Types of Ambiguity	Equity Ensemble Awards	Outstanding Performance by an Ensemble in a Miniseries or Telemovie	Won	
2024	Women of Troy	Tasmanian Council Theatre Awards	Best Performance	Won	
