= This Is Not a Love Story =

This is Not a Love Story
- Directed by: Keith Hill
- Written by: Keith Hill
- Produced by: Andrew Calder; Keith Hill
- Starring: Sarah Smuts-Kennedy; Stephen Lovatt
- Cinematography: Phil Burchell
- Edited by: Keith Hill
- Music by: Steve Garden
- Release date: 2002
- Running time: 81 min
- Country: New Zealand
- Language: English
- Budget: $150,000

This is Not a Love Story is a 2002 New Zealand film directed and written by Keith Hill that depicts a love triangle. It debuted at Dances With Films where it won the award for best produced screenplay. It was filmed in Auckland with many of the cast and crew working for free and was released into theatres in October 2003.

== Cast ==
- Sarah Smuts-Kennedy as Belinda
- Stephen Lovatt as Tony
- Peta Rutter as Suzanne
- Beryl Te Wiata as Violet
- Peter Elliott as Karl
- Stelios Yiakmis as Geoff
- Bruce Hopkins as TV writer

== Reception ==
Robert Koehler from Variety writes "Far more adult than most American indie pics treading similar turf, Hill’s first feature (after several well-regarded shorts) reveals a writer-director-editor of considerable talent, equally strong on camera placement, pacing, language and character detail, all of it suggesting more good things to come."

== Awards ==
New Zealand Film and TV Awards 2003

- Best Screenplay - Digital Feature - Keith Hill - nominated
- Best Performance - Digital Feature - Stephen Lovatt - nominated
