= Beaver (singer) =

New Zealand singer

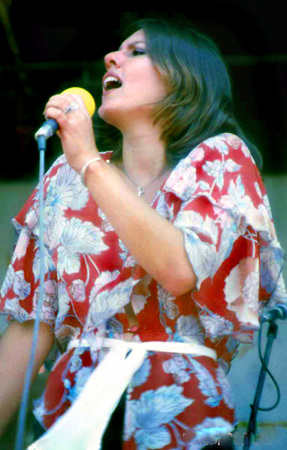
Performance at Nambassa 1979

Beverley Jean Morrison, known professionally as Beaver (28 December 1950 – 23 May 2010), was a New Zealand jazz singer. She was an occasional actress who appeared in small roles in television and film.

== Early life ==
Beverley Jean Morrison was born on 28 December 1950 in Lower Hutt.

== Career ==
Morrison was a long-running member of the ground-breaking Blerta musical and theatrical co-operative, and later of the similar troupe Red Mole. She played a small role in the 1985 movie Should I Be Good?, a New Zealand film based on the Mr. Asia drug ring, and performed the theme song to the TVNZ soap opera Gloss (1987–1990). In 1990, she played the role of a local horse farrier, Jean Bailey, in the Grundy Television film The Rogue Stallion.

== Awards ==
Her 1988 album Live at Ronnie Scott's was voted New Zealand's "Best Jazz Album" that year.

== Personal life ==
Morrison had two daughters with fellow New Zealand-born actor Bill Stalker.

She died of sarcoma at the age of 59 in Auckland.
