= Blerta =

Musical and theatrical co-operative in New Zealand

- Also known as: Bruno Lawrence's Electric Revelation and Travelling Apparition
- Origin: New Zealand
- Genres: Musical and theatre company
- Years active: 1971–1975
- Past members: Bruno Lawrence; Geoff Murphy; Kemp Turirangi; Alan Moon; Corben Simpson; Murray Crooks; Tony Littlejohn; Beaver; Fane Flaws; Eric Foley; Chris Seresin; Bill Stalker; Christine Barnett; Ian Watkin; Bill Gruar; Patrick Bleakley; Tim Piper; Greg Taylor

Blerta ("Bruno Lawrence's Electric Revelation and Travelling Apparition") was a New Zealand musical and theatrical co-operative active from 1971 until 1975.

It was the idea of Bruno Lawrence to arrange a group of musicians, actors and friends, who would travel around New Zealand on a tour to get away from the pressure of the music and movie scene. He organised the travelling group, and in October 1971, they departed on their tour. The group travelled around New Zealand in a very distinctive red bus, concluding in January 1973 at the first large outdoor music festival in New Zealand, The Great Ngaruawahia Music Festival, before heading up the eastern seaboard of Australia, and performing at the 1973 Aquarius Festival at the Northern Rivers NSW hippie town of Nimbin.

The group lived in a commune for many years. Three families lived together, including those of Bruno Lawrence and Geoff Murphy. The group came to the attention of the New Zealand film industry and were employed at times to create work for TVNZ. The group were labelled as hippies during that time and were looked down upon by some in the industry, despite the quality and nature of their work. Nevertheless, the band had a significant hit with their song "Dance All Around The World", which reached #13 in the N.Z. music charts in June 1972.

The line-up changed throughout the years that Blerta travelled. Members included Lawrence, Fane Flaws, Beaver, Geoff Murphy, Tony Barry, Patrick Bleakley, Ian Watkin and Mick Lieber, as well as many others, of which some had previously worked with Bruno in bands and others joined along the way. The original line up was Bruno Lawrence, Corben Simpson, Kemp Turirangi, Geoff Murphy, Alan Moon, Tony Littlejohn, Beaver, Eric Foley, and Chris Seresin. The great adventure and experience of Blerta finished in 1975, with the troupe embarking on one last tour.

Although Bruno Lawrence and Geoff Murphy were friends for many years, the two had a falling out five years prior to Lawrence's death. They never reconciled, and Murphy was absent from Lawrence's funeral.

== Discography ==
Date of release	Title	Label	Charted	Country	Catalog number
1972	Joy Joy	–	–	–	–
1974	This Is The Life	EMI	–	–	–
1976	Wild Man		–	–	–
2001	The Return Trip..	EMI	–	–	535096.2
