= Cyclone Tracy (miniseries) =

- Written by: Michael Fisher; Ted Roberts; Leon Saunders
- Directed by: Donald Crombie; Kathy Mueller
- Starring: Tracy Mann
- Country of origin: Australia
- Original language: English
- No. of episodes: 3

Production
- Running time: 120 minutes
- Production company: PBL Productions

Original release
- Network: Nine Network
- Release: 5 November – 7 November 1986

Cyclone Tracy is a 1986 Australian drama mini series about Cyclone Tracy. In 1986, the Nine Network and PBL created the mini-series based on the events during the cyclone. Michael Fisher, Ted Roberts and Leon Saunders wrote the series, and it starred Chris Haywood and Tracy Mann, who played the lead characters of Steve and Connie. Tony Barry also featured amongst the cast.

== Cast ==
- John Russell Waters as Narrator
- Chris Haywood as Steve Parry
- Nicholas Hammond as Harry Nelson
- Tracy Mann as Connie Hampton
- Linda Cropper as Joycie
- Tony Barry as Mick Brennan
- Aileen Britton as Big Caroline
- Caroline Gillmer as Little Caroline
- Jack Webster as Bobbie
- Paul Pryor as Hilton
- Nicholas Papademetriou as Theo
- Noel Hodda as Lt. Tony Baker
- Brendon Nolan as Army Officer
- Charito Ortez as Sandy Brennan
- Gerry Skilton as Wayne Churchill
- Stella Stefanidis as Mrs Kanderakis
- Roger Cox as Doc
- Johann Huang as Billy Hong
- Kate Ritchie as Molly
- Kendall Monaghan as Megan
- Lorraine Mafi-Williams as Alice Blue
- Graham Moore as Dreamboy
- Cecil Parkee as Benjamin
- David Slingsby as Hawthorne
- Saxon Cheng as Tom
- Creon Cheng as Jimmy
- Brian Roberts as Trevor Roberts
- Barry Langrish as Nugget
- Allan Penney as Ferret
- Sheb Wooley as Ben Miller
- Sinan Leong as Lindy Hong
- Ray Chong as Mr Hong Snr.
- Ruth Chong as Mrs Hong Snr.
- Justin Lo as Bobby Hong
- Brendin Lo as Gavin Hong
- Robert Leong as Baby Hong
- Tony Blackett as Hastings
- Dan Holliday as Rook
- Lyndon Harris as Naval Operator
- David Downer as Mr. Renmark
- Susan Leith as Nurse Lyndoch
- Mary Regan as Sister Kingston
- Stan Penrose as Patient 1
- Peter Bellamy as Patient 2
- Susan Edmonds as Nurse 1
- Tasman Duffy as Injured Boy
- Ken Radley as Ambulanceman
- Alister Barnes as Man
- Myfanwy Morgan as Wife
- David Wilson as Sergeant
- Glen Keenan as Young Cop

== Home media release ==
The mini-series was released on DVD by Umbrella Entertainment in December 2005. The DVD is compatible with all region codes and includes special features such as newsreel footage of the devastation and a documentary titled On A Wind and a Prayer.
