= Bridge to Nowhere (film) =

1986 film by Ian Mune

- Directed by: Ian Mune
- Written by: Bill Baer; Ian Mune
- Produced by: Larry Parr
- Starring: Matthew Hunter; Margaret Umbers; Shelly Luxford; Stephen Judd; Phillip Gordon; Bruno Lawrence
- Cinematography: Kevin Hayward
- Edited by: Finola Dwyer
- Music by: Stephen McCurdy
- Production company: Challenge Film Corporation
- Distributed by: Mirage Films
- Release date: 16 May 1986
- Running time: 86 minutes
- Country: New Zealand
- Language: English

Bridge to Nowhere is a 1986 New Zealand horror/thriller film directed and co-written by Ian Mune, and produced by Larry Parr. It centres on a group of teenagers who must fight for survival after coming across a mysterious hermit while on a camping trip.

== Plot ==
On a weekend camping trip, five teenagers in New Zealand are on a mission to search for an abandoned and overgrown bridge in the wilderness. On their travels, group leader, Leon (Philip Gordon) encounters Lise (Alison Routledge), bathing naked. Her companion, Mac (Bruno Lawrence), a hermit-like farmer, discovers Leon spying on Lise, and in a fit of jealousy, kills him. Tensions mount, as it becomes apparent that Mac is definitely not happy to see the intruders. A battle for survival ensues as Mac begins to hunt the group down in a murderous spree, and the group find themselves lost in the bush.

== Cast ==
- Matthew Hunter as Carl
- Margaret Umbers as Tanya
- Shelly Luxford as Julie
- Stephen Judd as Gray
- Phillip Gordon as Leon
- Bruno Lawrence as Mac
- Alison Routledge as Lise

== Production ==
Bridge to Nowhere was directed by New Zealand filmmaker Ian Mune, who also co-wrote the film's script. It was his second feature film, as director. Originally written by American Bill Baer, the film was pre-sold to an investor in the United States. Mune's agent thought letting the dog die hurt the film's commercial chances in the States.

== Reception ==
Helen Martin in New Zealand film, 1912-1996 wrote "Unfortunately, after a promising beginning it quickly deteriorates into a mindless scream and run affair in which sound and fury substitute for motivation and logical action." In Variety Don Groves said "It's an engaging, if occasionally gory and slightly drawn-out thriller probably will do healthy business in its native New Zealand, particularly with youth audiences who will identify with the imperiled characters, and enjoy the sprinkling of rock tunes, some by Kiwi bands ."

Denis Kilcommons of Huddersfield Daily Examiner writes "This is an excellent survival film with some good performances from all the youngsters and in particular from Mathew Hunter and Margaret Umbers, while Bruno Lawrence provides a brooding presence as the man on their trail. But the real star of this film is the scenery — the great outdoors of New Zealand and that mist-shrouded bridge." Poole's Advertiser gave it 2 stars and said "The plot is just an excuse to shock and the blood and violence has earned it an 18 certificate."
