= Jack Be Nimble (film) =

1993 film by Garth Maxwell

- Directed by: Garth Maxwell
- Written by: Garth Maxwell; Rex Pilgrim
- Produced by: John Barnett; Murray Newey; Jonathan Dowling; Kelly Rogers
- Starring: Alexis Arquette; Sarah Smuts-Kennedy; Bruno Lawrence
- Cinematography: Donald Duncan
- Edited by: John Gilbert
- Music by: Chris Neal
- Distributed by: New Zealand Film Commission, Essential Films
- Release date: 1993
- Running time: 95 minutes
- Country: New Zealand
- Language: English

Jack Be Nimble is a 1993 New Zealand Gothic horror film directed by Garth Maxwell, who later described it as "a stylised supernatural tale". The film stars the American Alexis Arquette and the New Zealand actor Sarah Smuts-Kennedy. It includes one of the final movie appearances of the British/New Zealand actor and musician Bruno Lawrence.

== Cast ==
- Alexis Arquette as Jack
- Sarah Smuts-Kennedy as Dora
- Bruno Lawrence as Teddy
- Tony Barry as Clarrie
- Elizabeth Hawthorne as Bernice
- Brenda Simmons as Mrs Birch
- Gilbert Goldie as Mr Birch

== Plot ==
Jack (Arquette) decides to put an end to the abuse he has received from his adoptive parents, and runs away to find his long lost sister, Dora (Smuts-Kennedy). Although Dora has fared much better since their abandonment and subsequent adoption, she is also drawn to use her telepathic powers to find him. Along the way, Jack is constantly pursued by the four daughters of his adoptive parents, seeking revenge for their parents' demise at the hands of Jack and his invention.

== Home release ==
The film is available on DVD and Blu-ray.

== Critical reception ==
Stephen Holden of The New York Times wrote that "the film cuts back and forth between scenes of their childhood and adolescence, it evokes their misery and isolation with a feverish intensity that recalls scenes from Hitchcock and De Palma". Dominic Corry of the New Zealand Herald described the film as "one of the strangest New Zealand films ever made" and thought that it "deserves way more of a cult reputation than it currently enjoys". Kim Newman of Empire Online said that Jack be Nimble was, "Not a film likely to please everyone, but strong stuff nonetheless". Daily News's Jami Bernard gave it 2 1/2 stars finishing "Yet there is a coldness and distance to the movie that never allows the audience to feel for Jack. Without emotional resonance to back them up, those incredibly striking visuals go to waste." Christopher Harris of The Globe and Mail gave it 2 stars and writes "Maxwell is talented — he's good at building and sustaining a sense of foreboding. But it's a foreboding that, in the end, goes nowhere in particular. Jack Be Nimble is a half-formed thing. Half the time it's too overwrought, too outlandish. The other half it's not outlandish enough." The Record's Jerry Tallmer gave it 1 1/2 stars and says it is "a movie constructed in a mosaic of abrupt disparate short takes," and ends "I guess you can force a horse to water, but can you make him love movies like this?" Steve Murray in the Atlanta Journal writes "The stylized direction verges on designer-chic savagery at times. And by delving ever deeper into the supernatural — climaxing in a telekinetic frenzy heisted from "Carrie" — his script loses grounding and settles for ambiguous hoodoo. (It doesn't help that Arquette acts over the top.) Even so, Maxwell's flair for visually driven narrative makes him a talent to watch." The Houston Chronicle's capsual review says "Be quick and sidestep this picture."
