= Porters (1988 TV series) =

1988 New Zealand television series

- Written by: Jonathon Hardy
- Directed by: Noam Pitlik
- Composer: Matthew Brown
- Country of origin: New Zealand
- Original language: English
- No. of seasons: 1
- No. of episodes: 6

Production
- Producers: Jonathon Hardy; Murray Newey; Dean Hill
- Cinematography: Michael O'Connor
- Running time: 25 minutes

Original release
- Release: August 28 – October 2, 1988

Porters is a New Zealand television series that aired on Two in 1988. It was a comedy written by Jonathon Hardy and directed by Noam Pitlik. It had six episodes produced over six weeks.

== Cast ==
- Roy Billing as Harry Lewis
- Peter Bland as Bill Porteous
- Judie Douglass as Gertrude Tell
- George Henare as Sid Tuwhare
- Bill Johnson as Clive Rowlands
- Stephen Judd as Peter Lowe
