= Hard Knocks (1980 film) =

- Film poster
- Directed by: Don McLennan
- Written by: Hilton Bonner; Don McLennan
- Starring: Tracy Mann; Bill Hunter; Max Cullen; Tony Barry; Kirstie Grant
- Production company: Ukiyo Films
- Release date: 1980
- Country: Australia
- Language: English
- Budget: AU $33,500

Hard Knocks is a 1980 Australian film directed by Don McLennan.

== Cast ==
- Tracy Mann as Samantha
- Bill Hunter as Brady
- Max Cullen as Newman
- Tony Barry as Barry
- Kirstie Grant
- Tony Bonner as Bar Patron

== Production ==
Director Don McLennan got the idea to make the film from a story in the newspaper about an ex-prisoner who becomes a model. He wrote a script and got the money to make a 50-minute film but decided to turn it into a feature. It was made for $35,000 and Trevor Lucas of Andromeda Films paid for post production.

== Soundtrack ==
Chart (1980)	Peak position
Australia (Kent Music Report)	62
