= Heart of the Stag =

- Directed by: Michael Firth
- Written by: Neil Illingworth
- Produced by: Michael Firth Don Reynolds
- Starring: Bruno Lawrence; Terence Cooper; Mary Regan
- Cinematography: James Bartle
- Edited by: Michael Horton
- Music by: Leonard Rosenman
- Release date: October 1984
- Running time: 94 min
- Country: New Zealand
- Language: English

Heart of the Stag is a 1984 New Zealand film.

== Synopsis ==
A farm hand discovers his boss is sexually abusing his daughter.

== Cast ==
- Bruno Lawrence as Peter Daly
- Terence Cooper as Robert Jackson
- Mary Regan as Cathy Jackson
- Anne Flannery as Mary Jackson
- Michael Wilson as Michael Wilson
- Susanne Cowie as Young Cathy

== Reception ==
New Zealand film, 1912-1996 says "Heart of the Stag is a tense, unsensationalised psychological drama." and notes "The performances are convincing and avoid caricature despite the archetypal roles." In the New York Times Vincent Canby said Heart of the Stag was "a dreary New Zealand melodrama" Gene Siskel in the Chicago Tribune gives i 2 1/2 stars and notes "the script is so obvious, yet the acting is memorable - that's the combination that leaves one frustrated while watching". Hans Petrovic of The Press said the film "wastes no time setting its story in motion, presents several delightfully tense confrontations between the main protagonists, comes to a well-thought-out (but predictable) climax, but leaves the underlying problem unresolved, and the audience without anything to chew on after leaving the cinema." Comparing it to Smash Palace The Courier-Journal critic Roger Fristoe writes "Like the earlier film, it offers perceptive direction, sensitive acting and atmospheric photography of the striking terrain found in remote rural areas of New Zealand's North Island. The touches of gritty humor that director Roger Donaldson brought to "Smash Palace" are missing, and the new film has an occasional tendency toward overwrought melodrama." He gave it 3 stars.
