= Peppermint Twist (TV series) =

1987 New Zealand television series

- Written by: Simon O'Connor; Judith Fyfe; Simon Morris; Judy Callingham; Bruce Phillips; Robert Lord; Ian Watkin; Peter Hawes; John Smythe
- Directed by: John Whitwell; David Copeland; John Givins; Daniel McKirdy; Chris Sheil; Stephen La Hood; Brian Lennane
- Country of origin: New Zealand
- Original language: English
- No. of seasons: 1
- No. of episodes: 33

Production
- Producers: Ruth Frank; Ginette McDonald; Deborah Daley
- Running time: 25 minutes

Original release
- Release: July 26, 1987 – March 5, 1988

Peppermint Twist is a New Zealand television series that aired on Two beginning in 1987. With a large focus on music it centres around teenagers in the small New Zealand town of Roseville.

== Cast ==
- Ruth Bijl as Diane Wright
- Stephen Judd as Harvey Springer
- Louise Graham as Mandy Stapleton
- Iain Rea as Joseph Ryan
- Stanley Findlay as Spiro Papadopoulous
- Murray Keane as Chris Watts
- Felicity Samuel as Lynette McKnight
- D'arcy Waldegrave as Dean Wright
- Ross Girven as Hamish Stapleton
- Mark Wright as Mick Ryan
- Christianne Phillips as Dutch Twin
- Marianne Govaerts as Dutch Twin
- Ian Watkin as Clive Springer
- Lewis Rowe as Eric Stapleton
- Ann Pacey as Mrs Mac
- Tony Burton as Doug Wright

== Reception ==
Peppermint Twist began well in the ratings, coming in 7th overall and second with the 10-19 age group. By September it had dropped to 15th but risen to 1st with the 10-19 age group.

Writing on the early episodes A.K. Grant in The Press criticised the acting but said "But there are a great many episodes planned, and it may be that once performers, writers and directors relax a bit the show will improve substantially. It is early days yet."

Dave Wilson of The Press wrote that it targeted the wrong audience saying "That audience, I would submit, is the over 30s who were there in '62, and just love to see all the memorabilia of the day back on show." He notes "Unfortunately the young actors in "Peppermint Twist" play the Show like a high school drama night, and the result is amateurish."
