= Noam Pitlik =

American actor and television director (1932–1999)

- Pitlik in General Electric True, 1963
- Born: November 4, 1932; Philadelphia, Pennsylvania, U.S.
- Died: February 18, 1999 (aged 66); Los Angeles, California, U.S.
- Other name: Noam Pitlick
- Education: Gratz College; Temple University
- Occupations: Actor; director; producer
- Years active: 1954–1999
- Spouses: Jesse Blostein (m. 1967; div. 1970) Linda Hirsch (m. 1974; div. 1977) Susan Whittaker (m. 1986)

Noam Pitlik (November 4, 1932 – February 18, 1999) was an American television director and actor. In 1979, Pitlik won an Emmy for Outstanding Directing for a Comedy Series for his work on the ABC sitcom Barney Miller.

== Early life ==
The son of Dr. and Mrs. Samuel Pitlik, he was a graduate of Central High School, Gratz College, and Temple University.

== Career ==
Pitlik began his acting career in a Western series on WCAU in Philadelphia. In 1951, he was part of the set design and construction crew for the Philadelphia Experimental Theater. In 1952, he was a member of the cast for the Summer Theater Guild's production of Philadelphia Story in Indiana, Pennsylvania.

In 1957, he appeared in the acclaimed off-Broadway production of Kurt Weill's The Threepenny Opera. During the 1960s and 1970s, Pitlik became a familiar character actor on television, making guest appearances in around 80 different TV series (making multiple appearances in several) including The Untouchables; The Rifleman; The Patty Duke Show; Gunsmoke; My Favorite Martian; Combat!; The Virginian; The Munsters, Gidget; The Andy Griffith Show; Gomer Pyle, U.S.M.C.; Get Smart; The Invaders; The Fugitive; The F.B.I.; I Dream of Jeannie; Hogan's Heroes (in seven different roles, including in the pilot episode); The Monkees; Bewitched; The Flying Nun; That Girl; Run for Your Life; The Mod Squad; The Doris Day Show; The Odd Couple; Nanny and the Professor; The Partridge Family; Room 222; Night Gallery; Love, American Style; All in the Family; Mannix; Ironside; Cannon; Barnaby Jones; Hawkins; and The Six Million Dollar Man.

He also had recurring roles on Ben Casey; I'm Dickens, He's Fenster; The Bob Newhart Show, and Sanford and Son. He appeared in TV movies, commercials and some theatrical films such as The Fortune Cookie, The Graduate, Fitzwilly, and The Front Page. Although largely retired from acting during the mid-1970s to concentrate on directing, he made a handful of widely spaced acting appearances over the next two decades. His final appearance as an actor was in an episode of Becker in 1998.

Pitlik directed episodes of 29 different TV series including Barney Miller (102 episodes, more than anyone else), Wings (27 episodes), Night Court (1 episode), Mr. Belvedere (44 episodes), Off the Rack (6 episodes), Taxi (11 episodes), One Day at a Time (18 episodes) and Porters (6 episodes). In addition to the Emmy, he also received the Peabody Award and Directors Guild of America Award for his work on Barney Miller.

== Personal life and death ==
Pitlik was married three times; his first marriage was to Jesse Lou Blostein on February 11, 1967. They divorced on September 29, 1970. Pitlik next married Linda Hirsch on June 23, 1974; they divorced on April 25, 1977. Pitlik's last marriage was to Susan Whittaker on January 18, 1986. They remained married until his death at Cedars-Sinai Medical Center from lung cancer on February 18, 1999, at the age of 66.

== Filmography ==
Year	Title	Role	Notes
1963	A Child Is Waiting	Concerned Father	Uncredited
1963	My Favorite Martian	Officer Thorp	
1965	The Satan Bug	Motel Clerk	Uncredited
1965	The Hallelujah Trail	Interpreter	
1965	Hogan's Heroes	Wagner	The Informer, series pilot
1965	Gunsmoke (TV series)	Dobbs	S10:E29, “20 Miles From Dodge”
1966	The Fortune Cookie	Max	
1966	Penelope	Bank Security Guard	Uncredited
1966	Texas Across the River	Indian	Uncredited
1966	The Young Warriors		
1967	Fitzwilly	Charles	
1967	The Graduate	Gas Station Attendant	Uncredited
1967	The Monkees (TV series)	Shazar	S2:E3, “Everywhere a Sheik, Sheik”
1967	The Monkees (TV series)	Harry	S2:E12, “Hitting the High Seas”
1968	Fade In	George	
1968	The Virginian (TV series)	Walt Hardesty	S6:E24, “The Handy Man”
1968	Hogan's Heroes (TV series)	Major Lutz	S4:E2, “The Gonculator”
1968	Get Smart	Bodecker	S3:E26, “The Reluctant Redhead”
1968-69	The Mod Squad (TV series)	Simon Alpert	2 episodes
1969	The Thousand Plane Raid	Lt. Jacoby	
1969	Here Come the Brides (TV series)	Forbes	S2:E8, "The Legend of Big Foot"
1969	The Big Bounce	Sam Turner	
1969	I Dream of Jeannie (TV series)	Major Gregorian	S5:E14, “Never Put a Genie on a Budget”
1969	Downhill Racer	T.V. Announcer	Uncredited
1970	Hogan's Heroes (TV series)	Major Strauss	S5:E21, “Standing Room Only”
1970	Hogan's Heroes (TV series)	Captain Metzler	S6:E2, “The Experts”
1970	Bewitched (TV series)	Newton	S7:E4, “Samantha's Hot Bedwarmer”
1970	Bewitched (TV series)	Ashley Flynn	S7:E9, “Samantha's Pet Warlock”
1970	The Tim Conway Show (TV series)	Actor	Episode S1:E10
1970	My World and Welcome to It (TV series)	Noel	S1:E20, "The Middle Years"
1970	The Bold Ones: The Senator (TV series)	Frank Bettancourt	2 episodes
1970	Room 222 (TV series)	Jerry Colby	S2:E7, "Half Way"
1971	Nanny and the Professor (TV series)	Prof. Fisk	2 episodes
1971	Night Gallery (TV series)	Driver	S2:E2, "Death in the Family" (segment)
1971	All in the Family (TV series)	Wilbur	S2:E13, "Christmas Day at the Bunkers"
1971-73	The New Dick Van Dyke Show (TV series)	Chuck Brewster	3 episodes
1972	Sanford and Son (TV series)	Officer 'Swanny' Swanhauser	6 episodes
1972	Nichols (TV series)	Jack Stone	S1:E16, "The Unholy Alliance"
1972	Me and the Chimp (TV series)	Arnie Pearlman	S1:E11, "Mike's Night-In"n
1972-75	The Bob Newhart Show (TV series)	Mr. Victor Gianelli	5 episodes
1973	The Bait	Solomon	ABC Movie of the Week
1973	Cannon (TV series)	Charlie Owens	S2:E18, "Murder for Murder"
1973	Hawkins (TV series)	Prof. Hastings	S1:E3, "A Life for a Life"
1973	Barnaby Jones (TV series)	Jake Turner	S2:E8, "The Deadly Prize"
1973	The Nancy Dussault Show (Television pilot)	Bedford	Directed by Dick Van Dyke, written by Carl Reiner
1974	The Front Page	Wilson	
1974	Houston, We've Got a Problem	Moshe	ABC Movie of the Week
1974	The Odd Couple (TV series)	O'Herlihy	S5:E2, "To Bowl or not to Bowl"
1974	The Six Million Dollar Man (TV series)	MacGregor	S2:E7, "The Midas Touch"
1974	The Partridge Family (TV series)	Rabbi Ben Stern	S4:E17, "Danny Converts"
1974-75	Police Story (TV series)	Detective Joe Kovak	2 episodes
