= Tracy Mann =

Australian actress

- Born: Adelaide, South Australia, Australia
- Occupations: Actress, voice artist
- Years active: 1971–present

Tracy Mann is an Australian actress and voice artist. She became known for playing deaf biker's moll Georgie Baxter in Prisoner. After appearing in a number of television series, she won an Australian Film Institute award in 1980 for the film Hard Knocks. She has also won awards for her work in the miniseries Sword of Honour and 2005 comedy film Hating Alison Ashley.

== Early life and education ==
Mann was born in Adelaide, South Australia.

She undertook dance classes from the age of seven and drama classes from the age of nine, learning mime, clowning, and singing. As a teenager she joined the Saturday Company, a branch of the State Theatre Company of South Australia (STCSA). Fresh from high school in 1973, she performed in Winnie the Pooh for Adelaide Festival Theatre and joined Actors Equity of Australia.

Mann studied with Actors Studio in New York City in 1989, and subsequently studied in London under Phillipe Gaulier in 1993.

== Career ==
=== Television ===
Between 1975 and 1976, Mann got her big break playing Tina Harris in 250 episodes of 1970s soap opera The Box.

Mann is also well-remembered by audiences for playing deaf biker's moll Georgie Baxter in Prisoner. She also played the lead role of guitarist / singer Carol Howard in the 1984 ABC-TV series Sweet and Sour, The role saw her nominated for a 1984 Penguin Award for Best Actress in a Television series.

In 1986, Mann won the Logie Award for Most Popular Actress for her role in the four-part miniseries Sword of Honour. The same year, she was also nominated for a Logie for Most Popular Actress for the miniseries Cyclone Tracy.

Mann then played the lead role of Senior Constable Pauline Reardon in police drama Skirts (1990).

From 2013 to 2015, she appeared as the regular character of Maggie Wilcox (mother of main character Tom) in the romantic comedy drama series Wonderiand, alongside Michael Dorman, Jessica Tovey and Brooke Satchwell.

Other TV appearances include The Sullivans, The Young Doctors, Arcade, Holiday Island, Prisoner, A Country Practice, Cowra Breakout, GP, The Flying Doctors, Sweet and Sour, Boys from the Bush, Janus, All Saints, The Oracle, Ash Wednesday, Bellbird. She also made one-off guest appearances in shows such as Glenview High, Bluey, Matlock Police, Cop Shop, Kingswood Country Skyways, Good Guys Bad Guys, Water Rats, and Blue Heelers.

Mann has also undertaken voiceover work as Holophone in an episode of children's science fiction series Silversun, and Susie Sponge on the second season of popular animated series The Toothbrush Family. Her other voice acting roles include animated series Classic Tales, Kangaroo Creek Gang and Tracey McBean (produced by Southern Star Entertainment).

In 2024, Mann was announced for the Top End Wedding sequel series Top End Bub, where she reprised her role from the film for the television series. On 8 December 2024, Mann was named in the cast for Foxtel legal drama The Twelve. On 20 June 2025, Mann was named in the extended cast for SBS / NITV co-commission Reckless.

=== Film ===
Mann's first starring role on the big screen was the 1980 low budget drama Hard Knocks. She won the 1980 AFI Award for Best Actress in a Leading Role and a Sammy Award for Best New Talent for her portrayal of a young ex-prisoner being hassled by the police.

She played sister to the main character in 1982 New Zealand horror film The Scarecrow (known as Klynham Summer in the United States). It was the first New Zealand film invited to play at the Cannes Film Festival.

Mann has also appeared in the 1993 Australian satirical comedy Reckless Kelly opposite Yahoo Serious and Hugo Weaving, and the 2005 comedy Hating Alison Ashley alongside Delta Goodrem and Saskia Burmeister – the latter earning her a 2005 AACTA Award for Best Supporting Actress in Film. She appeared in 2012 dramedy film Any Questions for Ben? with Rachael Taylor and Josh Lawson, and the following year she was in 2013 crime film Felony, opposite Joel Edgerton.

In 2019, Mann appeared in the romantic comedy Top End Wedding opposite Miranda Tapsell. The same year, she also starred opposite Yvonne Strahovski, Luke Evans, and Noomi Rapace and Richard Roxburgh in the Australian-American psychological thriller Angel of Mine.

=== Theatre ===
Mann also has numerous theatre credits to her name. She has toured Australia with most of the major theatre companies including Belvoir St Theatre, Ensemble Theatre, HotHouse Theatre, Malthouse Theatre, Sydney Theatre Company and Melbourne Theatre Company.

She was nominated for Best Actress at the 1987 Theatre Critics Circle Awards for her role in a Davis Morely production of Crystal Clear. In 2014, she was nominated for a Sydney Theatre Award as part of the ensemble cast for a Sydney Theatre Company production of Noises Off. Her role as Sheila in an Ensemble Theatre production of Relatively Speaking earned her a nomination for Best Supporting Actress at the Sydney Theatre Awards in 2017.

== Filmography ==
=== Film ===
| Year | Title | Role | Notes |
|---|---|---|---|
| 1975 | The Box | Tina Harris | Feature film |
| 1980 | Hard Knocks | Samantha | Feature film |
| 1981 | The Scarecrow (aka Klynham Summer) | Prudence Pointdexter | Feature film |
| 1982 | Going Down | Karli | Feature film |
| 1983 | Ash Wednesday | | Short film |
| 1983 | Distinguished Guests | | Short film |
| 1984 | On Guard | | Short film |
| 1984 | Fast Talking | Sharon Hart | Feature film |
| 1990 | How Wonderful! | Kerry | Short film |
| 1993 | Reckless Kelly | Miss Twisty | Feature film |
| 1997 | 389 | | Short film |
| 1998 | Something Honest | | Short film |
| 1999 | The Cup (aka Phorpa) | Newsreader | Feature film |
| 2002 | The Birthday | | Short film |
| 2005 | Hating Alison Ashley | Erica's Mother | Feature film |
| 2011 | Sleeping Beauty | Waxing beautician | Feature film |
| 2012 | Any Questions For Ben? | Ben's mum | Feature film |
| 2013 | Felony | Gina Hopkins | Feature film |
| 2018 | Joy Boy | Janine | Short film |
| 2019 | Top End Wedding | Annie | Feature film |
| 2019 | Angel of Mine | Lena | Feature film |

=== Television ===
| Year | Title | Role | Notes |
|---|---|---|---|
| 1974 | Matlock Police | Jenny Perkins | Season 4, episode 229: "Dancing Class" |
| 1975 | Homicide | Jennifer 'Socks' O'Brien | Season 12, episode 4: "Snails for Dinner" |
| 1975 | The Box | Tina Harrison | 250 episodes |
| 1976 | Bellbird | | |
| 1977 | Bluey | Marcia Franks | Episode 25: "It's Not Worth the Risk" |
| 1977 | Glenview High | Cheryl Harrison | Episode 1: "The New Boy" |
| 1977 | The Sullivans | Angelique | 13 episodes |
| 1978 | The Restless Years | | |
| 1979 | Skyways | Mickey Devine | Episode 143: "The Biter Bit" |
| 1979 | The Oracle | | |
| 1980 | Arcade | Susie Blair | 14 episodes |
| 1980 | Spring & Fall | Terry | Season 1, episode 6: "Out of Line" |
| 1980 | Players in the Gallery | | Mniseries, 1 episode |
| 1980 | The Young Doctors | Gael Hogan | 11 episodes |
| 1981 | Prisoner | Georgie Baxter | Season 3, 12 episodes |
| 1981 | Holiday Island | Wendy Robinson | 18 episodes |
| 1981–1982 | Cop Shop | Lea Butler / Carol Meehan | Season 1, 2 episodes |
| 1982 | Watch This Space | Tracy | 1 episode |
| 1982 | A Special Place | | TV film |
| 1982 | Kingswood Country | Glenys Freckle | Season 4, episode 16: "A Dog Called Horse" |
| 1982 | Loose Ends | | Teleplay |
| 1984 | Sweet and Sour | Carol Howard | 20 episodes |
| 1984 | The Cop Show | Carol | TV pilot |
| 1984; 1991 | The Cowra Breakout | Sally Murphy | Miniseries, 5 episodes |
| 1986 | Cyclone Tracy | Connie Hampton | Miniseries, 3 episodes |
| 1986 | Sword of Honour | Esse Rogers | Miniseries, 4 episodes |
| 1988 | True Believers | Tess Ross | Miniseries, 7 episodes |
| 1988 | The Four Minute Mile | Jill Webster | TV film |
| 1989 | The Flying Doctors | Penny Armstrong | Season 4, 5 episodes |
| 1989 | How Wonderful! | Kerry | TV film |
| 1989 | Cassidy | Kate | Miniseries, 2 episodes |
| 1990 | Col'n Carpenter | Policewoman | Season 1, episode 14: "Wheels on Fire" |
| 1990 | Skirts | Pauline Reardon | Seasons 1–3, 40 episodes |
| 1992 | All Together Now | Jackie Hammond | Season 3, episode 10: "Devil Woman" |
| 1992 | Boys From The Bush | Lucinda | Season 2, episode 1: "High Flyers" |
| 1993 | A Country Practice | Jenny Pope | Season 1, 2 episodes |
| 1993, 1996 | G.P. | Nicole Learmont / Tanya Woods | Seasons 5 & 8, 2 episodes |
| 1994–1995 | Janus | Tina Bertram | Seasons 1–2, 12 episodes |
| 1997 | Water Rats | Superintendent Franklin | Season 2, episode 5: "Truth or Dare" |
| 1997 | The Tromaville Cafe | | |
| 1998 | Good Guys Bad Guys | Brenda Wick | Season 2, episode 6: "There's No Business Like Small Business" |
| 1999 | Heartbreak High | Isobel Saya | Season 7, 8 episodes |
| 1999 | The Toothbrush Family | Suzy Sponge (voice) | Animated series, 1 episode: "Pegs" |
| 2001–2006 | Tracey McBean | Voice | Animated series |
| 2001; 2020; 2024 | Home and Away | Judge / Jill Lawson | 5 episodes |
| 2002; 2007–2008 | All Saints | Laura McDermott / Kaye Clinton | Seasons 5 & 10-11, 7 episodes |
| 2002 | Kangaroo Creek Gang | Voice | Animated series |
| 2003 | MDA | Penny Silvani | Season 2, episode 18: "Conflict of Interest" |
| 2004 | Silversun | Holophone | Season 1, episode 16: "Call Waiting" |
| 2004 | Noah & Saskia | Deb Litras | 8 episodes |
| 2004 | The Brush-Off | Faye Curnow | TV film |
| 2005 | Blue Heelers | Psychologist | Season 12, episode 18: "Monster" |
| 2007 | H2O: Just Add Water | Newsreader | Season 2, episode 1: "Stormy Weather" |
| 2008 | Classic Tales | Voice | Animated series, episode 21: "Hansel and Gretel" |
| 2008 | Infamous Victory: Ben Chifley's Battle For Coal | Elizabeth Chifley | TV film |
| 2009 | East of Everything | Rosemary de Jong | Season 2, 5 episodes |
| 2011 | City Homicide | Melissa Gordon | Season 5, episode 1: "No Greater Honour: Reward Day" |
| 2011–2012 | Laid | Marion McVie | Seasons 1–2, 7 episodes |
| 2013–2015 | Wonderland | Maggie Wilcox | Seasons 1–3, 44 episodes |
| 2017 | Here Come The Habibs | Mrs. Plunge | Season 2, episode 4: "Middle East Side Story" |
| 2018 | Rake | Dallas | Season 5, episode 8: "Greene v The Reckoning" |
| 2019 | Rosehaven | Karina | Season 3, episode 2 |
| 2019 | Time & Place | Alice Woodruff | Web series |
| 2020 | Chan & Dee's Drink Tank | Didi | |
| 2022 | Latecomers | Deb | Miniseries, 6 episodes |
| 2022–2024 | Five Bedrooms | Cheryl Elling | Seasons 2 & 4, 4 episodes |
| 2025 | The Twelve | Judge West | Season 3, 8 episodes |
| 2025 | Top End Bub | Annie Pelton | TBA |
| 2025 | Reckless | Valda | 4 episodes |

== Radio ==
| Year | Title | Role | Notes |
|---|---|---|---|
| 2005 | Meet the Candidate | Liberal Candidate | ABC Radio |
| 2005 | Minefields & Miniskirts | Margaret, the Vietnam Vet's Wife | ABC Cast Recording |
| 2007 | Embers | Omeo Farmer | ABC Radio |
| 2007 | Moral Hazard | Cath | ABC Radio |
| 2009 | Killing Oleander | Lead role | ABC Radio |
| 2017 | The Executioner | Veteran's wife | ABC Radio |

== Theatre ==
| Year | Title | Role | Venue / Co. |
|---|---|---|---|
| | God Bless Us Everyone | | |
| | The Crucible | | |
| | Our Town | | |
| 1971 | Fun is Creation | Dancer | Union Hall, Adelaide |
| 1971 | The Rape of Lucretia McColl | | |
| 1972 | Peter Pan | | |
| 1973 | Winnie the Pooh | Beetle / Friends & Relations | Festival Theatre, Adelaide with Harry M. Miller |
| 1975 | The Department | Myra | Marian St Theatre, Sydney |
| 1982 | Conundra | | Phillip St Theatre, Sydney with Ensemble Theatre, Sydney for Sydney Festival |
| 1984 | Performing Seals | | Seymour Centre, Sydney |
| 1986 | Catholic School Girls | Lead role | Majestic Cinemas, Sydney with Peers & Mann |
| 1986 | Crystal Clear | Lead role | Wharf Theatre, Sydney with Davis Morely |
| 1987 | When I Was a Girl I Used to Scream and Shout | Fiona | Wharf Theatre, Sydney & national tour x 2 with Davis Morely |
| 1987 | The Department | | Seymour Centre, Sydney |
| 1988 | The Recruiting Officer | | Albert Park Amphitheatre, Brisbane with QTC |
| 1991 | The Removalists | Kate Mason | Space Cabaret, Adelaide with STCSA & Wharf Theatre, Sydney with STC |
| 1992 | The Heidi Chronicles | Heidi Holland | Ensemble Theatre, Sydney |
| 1993 | Two Weeks with the Queen | Mum / Auntie Iris / Matron / Doctor / others | Ford Theatre, Geelong, Her Majesty's Theatre, Ballarat, Russell St Theatre, Melbourne with STC & MTC |
| 1993; 1995; 1996 | A Midsummer Night's Dream | Titania | Royal Botanic Gardens, Melbourne & Royal Botanic Garden, Sydney with Australian Shakespeare Company |
| 1995 | Dead Funny | | Perth Theatre Company |
| 1995 | That Eye, The Sky | | Playhouse Theatre, Perth with Black Swan State Theatre Company & The Space, Adelaide with Burning House Theatre Company |
| 1995 | The Malevolence | | Belvoir Street Theatre, Sydney |
| 1997 | Gary's House | Sue-Ann | Adelaide Festival Centre with STCSA |
| 1998; 2000; 2003 | The Gigli Concert | | Old Fitzroy Theatre, Perth & New Theatre, Sydney with O'Punksky's |
| 1999 | Carrying Light | Rose McBride | Space Theatre, Adelaide with STCSA |
| 2000 | The Beauty Queen of Leenane | Maureen Folan | Bridge Theatre, Sydney, Riverside Theatres Parramatta & The Playhouse, Canberra with STC |
| 2001 | Dinner with Friends | | Marian St Theatre, Sydney |
| 2001 | Burning | | Stables Theatre, Sydney with Griffin Theatre Company |
| 2001 | The Graduate | Mrs Braddock | Theatre Royal, Sydney with Really Useful Productions |
| 2002 | The Vagina Monologues | | Acton Street Theatre, Canberra |
| 2004–2005 | Minefields and Miniskirts | Margaret, the Vietnam Vet's Wife | Malthouse Theatre, Glen Street Theatre & NIDA Parade Theatre, Sydney |
| 2006 | Embers | Omeo Farmer / various roles | The Butter Factory Theatre, Wharf Theatre, Sydney & Majestic Cinemas with STC & HotHouse Theatre |
| 2007 | Last One Standing | Ruth | Old Fitzroy Hotel Theatre, Sydney with Tamarama Rock Surfers |
| 2007 | 1 in 100 | Sve – Female Lead 1 | Acton Street Theatre, Canberra |
| 2008 | Ruben Guthrie | Jan Guthrie | Belvoir St Theatre, Sydney |
| 2009 | Inside Out | Sue | The Butter Factory Theatre & Seymour Centre, Sydney with Christine Dunstan Productions |
| 2009 | Embers | Female 2 / various roles | Australian tour with HotHouse Theatre & STC |
| 2011 | Don Parties On | Kath Henderson | Playhouse, Melbourne & Sydney Theatre with MTC |
| 2011 | At Any Cost? | Meagan | The J Theatre, Noosa Heads & Ensemble Theatre, Sydney |
| 2012 | Never Did Me Any Harm | Woman | Force Majeure, Sydney |
| 2014 | Noises Off | Belinda Blair | Sydney Opera House with STC |
| 2016 | Never Did Me Any Harm | Nancy | Force Majeure, Sydney |
| 2016–2017 | Relatively Speaking | Sheila | Ensemble Theatre, Sydney |
| 2018 | After the Ball | | |
| 2019 | Made to Measure | Monica | Seymour Centre, Sydney |
| 2020 | Game. Set. Match (reading) | Lead role | Belvoir St Theatre, Sydney |
| 2021 | My Brilliant Career | Aunt Gussie / Grandma Bossier / The Midwife / Katie McSwat / Rose-Jane McSwat | Belvoir St Theatre, Sydney |
| 2021 | Home, I'm Darling | Sylvia | Sydney Opera House with STC |
| 2021 | A Clockwork Orange (development) | | ATYP |
| 2022 | Blithe Spirit | Dr George Bradman | Sydney Opera House with STC |
| 2024 | The Curious Incident of the Dog in the Night-Time | Mrs Alexander / various roles | Belvoir St Theatre, Sydney |
| 2025 | Aria | Monique | Ensemble Theatre, Sydney |

== Awards & nominations ==
| Year | Nominated work | Award | Category | Result |
|---|---|---|---|---|
| 1980 | Hard Knocks | Australian Film Institute Award | Best Actress in a Leading Role | Won |
| 1980 | Hard Knocks | Sammy Award | Best New Talent | Won |
| 1982 | The Scarecrow | MYSTFEST | Best Artistic Contribution (Ensemble Cast) | Won |
| 1984 | Sweet and Sour | Penguin Award | Best Actress in a Television series | Nominated |
| 1986 | Sword of Honour | Logie Award | Most Popular Actress in a Miniseries / Telemovie | Won |
| 1986 | Sword of Honour | Australian Film Institute Award | Best Performance by an Actress in a Miniseries | Nominated |
| 1986 | Cyclone Tracy | Logie Award | Most Popular Actress | Nominated |
| 1987 | Crystal Clear | Theatre Critics Circle Award | Best Actress | Nominated |
| 1990 | How Wonderful | Australian Film Institute Award | Best Actress in a Leading Role | Nominated |
| 2005 | Hating Alison Ashley | Australian Film Institute Award | Best Supporting Actress | Nominated |
| 2014 | Wonderland | Equity Ensemble Award | Outstanding Performance by an Ensemble in a Drama Series | Nominated |
| 2014 | Noises Off | Sydney Theatre Award | Best Ensemble Cast | Nominated |
| 2017 | Relatively Speaking | Sydney Theatre Award | Best Supporting Actress | Nominated |

== Personal life ==
Mann married director Scott Hartford-Davis on 6 March 2022.

A breast cancer survivor, Mann underwent a double mastectomy. She is a student of yoga. She claims credit for naming the Divinyls.

Mann went to Nepal to study Buddhism, and became a Buddhist.
