= Tank Busters =

1969 New Zealand television film

- Directed by: Geoff Murphy
- Starring: Stephen O'Rourke; Bill Gruar; Murray Reece
- Music by: John Charles; Malcolm McNeill
- Country of origin: New Zealand
- Original language: English

Production
- Producer: Geoff Murphy
- Cinematography: Alun Bollinger
- Editor: Simon Reece
- Running time: 31 minutes
- Production company: Acme Sausage Company
- Budget: $4,000

Original release
- Network: NZBC
- Release: 1969

Tank Busters is a 1969 New Zealand television film directed by Geoff Murphy. The film was first shown on television on New Years Eve 1970.

== Synopsis ==
A group of students decide to rob a safe but they don't co-ordinate their planning.

== Cast ==
- William Gruar as William
- Bruno Lawrence as Bruno
- Leslie Maughan as Wages Clerk
- Des Monaghan as Detective
- Geoff Murphy as Geoff
- Peter Needham as Pete
- Stephen O'Rourke as Stephen
- Murray Reece as Murray
- Keith Aberdein
- Max Bollinger
- William Maughan
- Bill Kennedy
- Judith Charles
- Harvey Mann
- Ina Gordon
- Rupert Glover
- Barry d'Oyle

== Production ==
The film was made over 9 months with filming done on weekends with borrowed equipment.
