= Michael Firth =

New Zealand film director

Michael John Firth (1949 – 9 October 2016) was a New Zealand film director and writer. Firth's first film, Off the Edge, was the first New Zealand feature to be Oscar-nominated.

== Filmography ==
=== Film ===
| Year | Title | Director | Producer | Writer | Notes |
|---|---|---|---|---|---|
| 1977 | Off the Edge | Yes | Yes | Yes | Also camera operator |
| 1984 | Heart of the Stag | Yes | Yes | Yes | Also editor |
| 1985 | Sylvia | Yes | Yes | Yes | |
| 1987 | The Leading Edge | Yes | Yes | Yes | Also cinematographer |
| 1994 | Vulcan Lane | Yes | Yes | No | |

Assistant director

- Nutcase (1980)

Camera operator

- Last Paradise (2013)

=== Television ===
| Year | Title | Director | Producer | Notes |
|---|---|---|---|---|
| 1992 | City of Volcanoes | Yes | Yes | |
| 1999–2001 | Adrenalize | No | Yes | |
| 2013 | Take the Bait | Yes | Yes | Also narrator, camera operator and editor |

== Awards ==
- 1977 Nominee for an Academy Award for Best Documentary Feature for Off the Edge (1976).

== See also ==
List of New Zealand Academy Award winners and nominees
