= Initiation (1987 film) =

- DVD cover
- Directed by: Michael Pearce
- Written by: James Barton
- Based on: Original idea by Michael Pearce
- Produced by: Jane Ballantyne
- Starring: Bruno Lawrence; Rodney Harvey; Miranda Otto
- Cinematography: Geoffrey Simpson
- Edited by: Denise Haratzis
- Music by: Stephen Matters
- Production companies: International Film Management; South Australian Film Corporation
- Distributed by: Goldfarb
- Release date: 1987
- Running time: 88 minutes
- Country: Australia
- Language: English
- Budget: A$3 million

Initiation is a 1987 Australian adventure drama thriller film directed by Michael Pearce based on his idea and starring Bruno Lawrence and Rodney Harvey.

== Plot ==
After the death of his mother, teenager Danny Molloy leaves New York to find his father Nat, who lives on an isolated farm in South Australia with Sal and her teenage daughter Stevie. Because income from the farm isn't sufficient, Nat uses his aeroplane to smuggle marijuana for the mafia. Danny accidentally burns down the shed but saves the bales of contraband which they hurriedly load onto the plane before the police arrive. The plane crashes into mountainous country and since his father is wounded, Danny has to set off alone through the bush, guided by a supernatural connection with his Aboriginal mentor.

== Cast ==
- Rodney Harvey as Danny Molloy
- Bruno Lawrence as Nat Molloy
- Miranda Otto as Stevie
- Arna-Maria Winchester as Sal
- Bobby Smith as Kulu
- Tony Barry as Pat
- Luciano Catenacci as Carlo

== Production ==
The film was shot in Adelaide and the Blue Mountains. It was completed in January 1987.

== Release ==
The film was pre-sold to US distributor Goldfarb for $850,000 but Goldfarb later backed out of this commitment claiming they did not have the money.

== Home media ==
A DVD transfer of the film was released in Australia by Flashback Entertainment, Cat. No. 24374

== Accolades ==
Bobby Smith was nominated for Best Supporting Actor at the 1987 AFI Awards.
