= Other Halves =

1984 New Zealand film

- Directed by: John Laing
- Written by: Sue McCauley
- Based on: Sue McCauley book
- Produced by: Tom Finlayson; Dean Hill
- Starring: Lisa Harrow; Mark Pilisi; Fraser Stephen-Smith
- Cinematography: Leon Narbey
- Edited by: Harley Oliver
- Music by: Don McGlashan
- Production companies: Finlayson-Hill Productions; Orringham
- Release date: 1 October 1984
- Running time: 106 minutes
- Country: New Zealand
- Language: English

Other Halves is a 1984 New Zealand film directed by John Laing. The film is based on a book by Sue McCauley.

== Synopsis ==
A relationship develops between a Maori boy in drug rehab and a married Pākehā woman when they meet in a psychiatric hospital.

== Cast ==
- Lisa Harrow as Liz
- Mark Pilisi as Tug
- Fraser Stephen-Smith as Michael
- Paul Gittins as Ken
- John Bach as Jim
- Clare Clifford as Aileen
- Bruce Purchase as Irwin
- Temuera Morrison as Tony
- Raymond Reid as Billy
- Allan Sio as Bones
- Olaf Ulberg as Bones
- Emma Piper as Audrey
- Grant Tilly as Dr. Wray
- Judy McIntosh as Nurse
- Yvonne Lawley as Alice
- Bob Gould as Neddy
- Alistair Topham as Slippers
- Paula Keenan as Receptionist
- Derek Neville as Musician
- Lottie Neville as Musician
- Onno Boelee as Patient
- Aniva Mata'afa-Hanson as Patient
- Michael Baxter-Lax as Patient
- Joan Chalmers as Patient
- Ira Seidenstein as Patient
- Fatala Valli as Patient
- Karam Hau as Patient
- Maggie Maxwell as Patient
- Karl Bradley as Patient
- Lyndon Peoples as Patient
- Kanba Mata'afa-Hanson as Patient
- Nigel Carpinter as Patient
- Steve Hall as Police
- Marua Whoreparn as Police
- Laine Dee as Police
- Rod Collison as Police
- Paul Robinson as Police
- David Jowsey as Police
- Stephen Tozer as Lawyer
- David Weatherley as Judge
- Alison Routledge as Paula
- Nathaniel Lees as Court Clerk
- Roy Billing as Harry Daniels
- Rex Merrie as Advertising Man
- Norman Keesing as Tug's Boss
- Pete Smith as Workmate
- Christopher Winn as Sean
- Amy Coleman as Sarah
- Stephen Barbovich as Gallery Man
- Susan Trainor as Bag Snatch Woman
- Gay Dean as Woman in Toilet
- Don Kjestrup as Taxi Driver
- Shirley Gruar as Aileen's Friend
- Nick Blane as Junkie
- Clemence Cuming as Junkie
- Farrell Cleary as Junkie
- Andrea Kelland as Junkie
- Henry Piho as Skinhead Gang
- Chris Tabuteau as Skinhead Gang
- Shaun Townsley as Skinhead Gang
- Nicholas Dowden as Skinhead Gang
- Michael Simpson as Skinhead Gang
- Matthew Hunter as Skinhead Gang

== Reviews ==
Wellington Film Society - "The film is littered with dichotomies...".
