= Sarah Smuts-Kennedy =

New Zealand actress and artist

- Occupation: Actress

Sarah Smuts-Kennedy is a New Zealand actress and artist.

Smuts-Kennedy played lead roles in Jack Be Nimble, This Is Not a Love Story and Overnight and a supporting role in The Footstep Man. She appeared as a lawyer in the New Zealand soap opera Shortland Street.

On stage she featured in Folie A Deux at Auckland's Watershed Theatre in 1996, Dr Akar's Women at the Stables and Scenes From an Affair at Old Fitzroy in 2001. and Blind City at the Darlinghurst Theatre in 2003.

Smuts-Kennedy also worked as an artist. In 2012 she graduated from Elam School of Fine Arts. She has worked with photography, video art, clay, paint, pastels and immersive installations. Her work crossed over into horticulture. She designed the trophy which is awarded for the SOUNZ Contemporary Award (Te Tohu Auaha) at the APRA Music Awards.
