= Sue McCauley =

New Zealand writer

Sue McCauley QSM (born 1 December 1941 in Dannevirke) is a New Zealand novelist, short story writer, playwright, journalist and screenwriter.

Her first novel was the semi-autobiographical Other Halves (1982), which won both the Wattie Book of the Year Award and the New Zealand Book Award for Fiction. It was adapted into a film, released in 1984 with McCauley credited as screenwriter.

Her manuscript "Landed" was shortlisted for the 2021 Michael Gifkins Prize and was published in March 2023 by Bateman.

== Novels ==
- Other Halves (1982) (Hodder & Stoughton)
- Then Again (1986) (Hodder & Stoughton)
- Bad Music (1990) (Hodder & Stoughton)
- A Fancy Man (1996) (Vintage)
- Tropic of Guile (2013) (Xlibris) a commissioned/sponsored novel
- Landed (2023) (Bateman Books)

== Short story collections ==
- It Could be You (1997)
- Life on Earth (2003)

These short stories and others have also appeared in numerous publications and anthologies including:

- The Best of New Zealand Fiction - vol.3 (2006) and vol.4 (2007)
- .. Graminees Review (2020) A French translation.

== Drama (Television Drama, Theatre Radio & Television Plays) ==
Television Drama

- The Shadow Trader (series) (1989)
- Shark in the Park (1991) Contributing writer
- Marlin Bay (1993) Contributing writer
- Mel’s Amazing Movies (1990s) Contributing writer- children’s series
- Posy Narkers (1990s) Contributing writer - children’s series
- Family Law Series (1990s) Educational dramatised videos.

Stage Plays

- Waiting for Heathcliff (1988) (Court Theatre)
- Hitting Fifty (2002) (Court Theatre)

Radio Plays

- The Obituary (1967)
- The Evening Out (1968)
- ABC (1970)
- Robbie (1972)
- Crutch (1975)
- Minor Adjustment (1975)
- Letters to May (1977)
- The Ordinary Girl (1978)
- When Did He Last Buy You Flowers? (1980)
- The Missionaries (1981)
- Isobel, God and the Cowboy (1981)
- The Ezra File (1982)
- Thank You Buzz Aldrin (1982)
- The Man Who Sleeps With his Mother (1983)
- The Ezra File (1982)
- Family Ties (1986)
- Waiting for Heathcliff (1989) - note: this is an adaption of stage play
- ..The Voice Despised (1989
- Rescue Remedy (1990)
- The Upward Mobility of Gordon Reddy (1998) (shortlisted for the Mobil Radio Awards)

Television Plays

- As Old As The World (1968)
- Friends and Neighbours (1974)

== Film Scripts ==
Feature Films

- Other Halves (1986) note: this is an adaption of the novel "Other Halves", which was written by Sue McCauley

Short Films

- Married (1993)
- Matrons of Honour (1994)
- "Food for Thought" (2015) Adaption of short story "The Assassin Bug".

== Journalism/ Non-Fiction ==
Non-Fiction

- Escape from Bosnia; Aza’s Story (1966) (Shoal Bay Press) as told to Sue McCauley by Aza Mehmedovic

Columns

- Hers (late 1960s) (NZ Listener)
- Sue McCauley On... (1970s) (Thursday Magazine)
- Lives (1988-9) (NZ Listener)

Autobiographical Essays (anthologised)

- My Father and Me (1993) (Tandem Press)
- Cherries on a Plate (1996) (Vintage)

Other

- contributor to New Zealand Heritage (1971) (historical periodical)
- contributor and TV reviewer (1970-80) (NZ Listener)
- Book reviewer (1990s) (New Zealand Books - a literary magazine)
- Reporter for - and part owner of - Waiheke Island's Gulf News (1974 -79)

== Awards ==
- Wattie Book Award (1982)
- Mobil Radio Award (1982)
- New Zealand Book Award (1983)
- Queen’s Service Medal (1986) as published in the Supplement to the New Zealand Gazette of

Thursday, 9 January 1986

== Fellowships ==
- Auckland University writer-in-residence (1986)
- Canterbury University writer-in-residence (1993)
- Hagley College writer-in-residence (2000)
- The Foxton Fellowship (2005)

== Book Editing (anthologies) ==
- Erotic Writing - (1992) (Penguin) co-authored by Richard McLachlan
- Mind & Mirror - (1994) (Orca Publishing Service) writing by women imprisoned
- Totally Devoted - (2002) (Harper Collins) true stories by readers of The Women's Weekly.
- A Magpie Stole My Heart (2003) (Whitireia Publishing) writing contributed by Whitireia students.

== Journalism Employment ==
- Copywriter, New Zealand Broadcasting Corporation (1958 - 1960) note: Sue was based in Napier then Wellington
- Journalist for the New Zealand Listener weekly magazine (1960 - 61 )
- Taranaki Herald (1963-64)
- Christchurch Press (1964 -65)

== Education ==
Sue attended Waitahora Primary School near Dannevirke; and then Nelson Girls’ College in the South Island
