= Corben Simpson =

New Zealand vocalist, songwriter, and musician

Corben Simpson is a New Zealand vocalist, songwriter, and musician. He is best known as a member of Blerta, and for co-writing and singing the song Dance All Around The World, which reached No. 13. in the New Zealand music charts in June 1972 and was voted as the 18th-best New Zealand song of all time.

In 1970, Simpson performed in a royal command performance for Prince Charles and Princess Anne.

In 2014, Simpson's album Get Up with the Sun was finally released on CD.

According to his Facebook page in 2017 Simpson is playing live and working on a new album with his current band The Corben Simpson Project.
