= Sylvia (1985 film) =

New Zealand biographical film about Sylvia Ashton-Warner

- Theatrical release poster
- Directed by: Michael Firth
- Written by: Sylvia Ashton-Warner; F. Fairfax; Michael Firth; Michele Quill
- Produced by: Michael Firth; Don Reynolds
- Starring: Eleanor David; Nigel Terry; Tom Wilkinson
- Cinematography: Ian Paul
- Edited by: Michael Horton
- Music by: Leonard Rosenman
- Production companies: Cinepro/Pillsbury Films; Southern Light Films
- Distributed by: MGM/UA
- Release date: 1985
- Running time: 95 minutes
- Country: New Zealand
- Language: English

Sylvia is a 1985 biographical film about New Zealand educator Sylvia Ashton-Warner, inspired by two of her books. The film was directed and co-written by New Zealander Michael Firth, and stars British actor Eleanor David as Ashton-Warner, alongside Tom Wilkinson, Nigel Terry and Mary Regan.

William Dart from Rip It Up noted "Sylvia seems remarkably low key, tame even."

The Village Voice critic Andrew Sarris rated Sylvia one of the ten best films of 1985. It also won praise from Vogue.

== Cast ==
- Eleanor David as Sylvia Ashton-Warner
- Tom Wilkinson as Keith Henderson
- Nigel Terry as Aden Morris
- Mary Regan as Opal Saunders
- Martyn Sanderson as Inspector Gulland
- Terence Cooper as Inspector Bletcher
- David Letch as Inspector Scragg
- Joe George as Seven
- Sarah Peirse as Vivian Wallop
