= Stephen Judd =

New Zealand actor

- Born: ~1965
- Occupation: Actor

Stephen Judd is a New Zealand actor. He starred as Gray in Bridge to Nowhere, the lead singer Harvey Springer in the TV series Peppermint Twist and the new porter Peter Lowe in Porters

Judd started acting in 1980 with the Youth Theater before studying at the New Zealand Drama School two years later. Early roles include parts in TV series Hanlon, Open House and Between The Lines.
