= How Wonderful! =

- Written by: Lynn Hegarty
- Directed by: Lynn Hergarty
- Starring: Tracy Mann
- Country of origin: Australia
- Original language: English

Production
- Running time: 90 mins
- Production company: Film Australia

Original release
- Release: 1989

How Wonderful! is a 1989 TV movie about a journalist who falls pregnant.

== Cast ==
- Tracy Mann as Kerry
- Sheila Kennelly as Aunt Helen
- Annie Byron as Midwife
- Toni Lamond as Kerry's Mum
- Wendy Strehlow as Perfect Mum / Francine Raymond / Politician's Mistress
