= Kangaroo Creek Gang =

- Genre: Animation
- Written by: Robert Greenberg
- Voices of: Andrew Crabbe; Marta Dusseldorp; John Leary
- Country of origin: Australia
- Original language: English
- No. of seasons: 1
- No. of episodes: 26

Production
- Running time: 30 minutes
- Production company: Southern Star Group

Original release
- Network: Nine Network
- Release: 1 April 2002 – 2002

Kangaroo Creek Gang is an Australian children's television cartoon series that first screened on the Nine Network in 2002. It was produced by Southern Star Group and based on a set of reading books created from 1981 that follow the adventures of a group of Australian bush animals. Prior to the television series, the original Kangaroo Creek Gang Cassette Tapes for the read-along books were recorded in the early 1980s in Perth, Western Australia and were voiced by Gregory Ker amongst others. Ker voiced the characters of Kevin Kangaroo, Wal Wombat, Tiddles Tiger Snake, Ranger West and also voiced the narrator for some of the read-along books. Helen Matthews, a well-known jazz singer, was also present for the cassette tape recordings and recorded the songs that were on the tapes.

== History ==
Kangaroo Creek Gang began as a series of books, extending to 40 titles with over one million copies sold around Australia. A comic strip was developed for the children's pages in News Limited's Sunday newspapers in most states of Australia.

The gang featured in a series of multi media packages distributed to primary schools, and were also involved with in-flight children's activity packages for Australian Airlines and Ansett. In 1990-91 the Kangaroo Creek Gang starred in a TV commercial for the State Bank of South Australia. The jingle was "saving makes sense is what we say". One of the characters, Kenny Kidna, had his own 30 second 'Goodnight girls and boys' segment at 7.30pm every night in Perth, Western Australia on television channel NEW-10.

The animated series was first broadcast on television in April 2002 on the Nine Network and aired on Starz Kids & Family for some time. The Kangaroo Creek Gang also appeared in live costume and puppet shows throughout Australia, performing primarily in shopping centres.

== Characters ==
- Kevin Kangaroo: (Voiced by Daniel Wyllie) is the main protagonist of the entire series. He is a kangaroo who likes to pull pranks on people.
- Kristie Koala
- Emily Emu
- Wally Wombat
- Mog, Mange, and Garbo: The feral cats
- Peg Platypus
- Eddie Echidna
- Morrie Magpie
- Paddy Possum
- Connie Kookaburra
- Tiddles Tiger snake
- Kenny Kidna
- Mr. Lizard
- Swizzle the Croc
- The Great Dingo

== Character voices ==
- Daniel Wyllie
- Marta Dusseldorp
- John Leary
- Rebecca Massey
- Akmal Saleh
- Anthony Hayes
- Eliza Logan
- Andrew Crabbe
- Keith Buckley
- Tracy Mann
- Gregory Ker (Cassette Tape recordings for read-along books 1980's)

== See also ==
- List of Australian television series
