= Pukemanu =

New Zealand television series (1971-72)

Pukemanu is a New Zealand television series that ran from 1971 to 1972.

== Background ==
The series, set in a fictional location, was considered to break ground in the way it approached the subject and examined the town that it was set in. It was produced by Tony Isaac. It was filmed on location in Ātiamuri.

== Cast ==
=== Main ===
- Ian Watkin as the town doctor.
- Ernie Leonard as Charlie Rata.
- Pat Evison as Phylis Telford (8 episodes)

=== Recurring/guests ===
- Tony Barry as Dan Harrigan (6 episodes)
- Peter Vere-Jones as Mark Gold (6 episodes)
- Kevin J. Wilson
- Ginette McDonald (1 episode)
- Bruno Lawrence as Biker
- Bill Stalker as Biker (1 episode)
- Walter Pym
