= Inside Straight (TV series) =

New Zealand television series

- Written by: Keith Aberdein; Grant Morris; Jack Klein
- Directed by: Ross Jennings; John Reid; Tony Wilson; Tony Isaac; John Laing
- Starring: Phillip Gordon; Roy Billing; Joanne Simpson
- Country of origin: New Zealand
- Original language: English
- No. of seasons: 1
- No. of episodes: 10

Production
- Producer: Peter Muxlow
- Running time: 60 minutes

Original release
- Release: August 28 – October 30, 1984

Inside Straight is a New Zealand television series that aired in 1984. It followed Steve Keenan who has moved to the city and becomes a taxi driver. There he befriends a fellow taxi driver and a stripper as he tries to find a dodgy financer. It was filmed in Wellington beginning in 1982 and it premiered on 28 August 1984.

== Cast ==
- Phillip Gordon as Steve Keenan:
- Roy Billing as George MacLean
- Joanne Simpson as Sylvia Davies
- Silvio Famularo as Leo Xirogiannis

== Episodes ==
1. Pilot
2. Night Porter
3. Tow Wars
4. Steve's Dad
5. Horse Switch
6. Taxi Hijack
7. Card Game
8. Orpheus & Euridice
9. Repossesion
10. Stand Up Comic

== Awards ==
Feltex Television Awards 1985

- Best Actor – Roy Billing – won
- Best New Talent – Phillip Gordon – won
- Best Director – Inside Straight, Tony Wilson – won
- Best Drama Programme – Inside Straight, Peter Muxlow – won
