= A Woman of Good Character =

- Directed by: David Blyth
- Written by: Elizabeth Gowans
- Produced by: Grahame McLean
- Starring: Sarah Peirse; Bruno Lawrence
- Cinematography: John Earnshaw
- Edited by: Jamie Selkirk
- Music by: Mark Nicholas
- Release date: 28 July 1982
- Running time: 50 min (74 min)
- Country: New Zealand
- Language: English

A Woman of Good Character is a 1982 New Zealand short telemovie. It aired on One on 28 July 1982. The film makers shot more scenes and it was re-released in 1983 as a full length feature titled It’s Lizzie to those Close. It tells the story of a British servant, Lizzie, who travels to New Zealand for a new opportunity.

== Cast ==
- Sarah Peirse as Lizzie
- Derek Hardwick as Mr Bowan Senior
- Jeremy Stephens as Reginald Bowan
- Bruno Lawrence as Jock

== Reception ==
The Press said "The film explores the male-settler mentality from the viewpoint of a woman isolated in a harsh male-orientated environment, with her stoic acceptance of the status quo underlining her lack of choice." In New Zealand film, 1912-1996 Helen Martin wrote "As an attempt at painting a picture of pioneering New Zealand, it is visually cute and the narrative lacks motivation."

== Awards ==
Feltex Television Awards 1982

- Best Actress - Sarah Peirse - won
- Best Actor - Bruno Lawrence - nominated
- Best Drama - A Woman of Good Character (Grahame McLean) - nominated
- Best Script - A Woman of Good Character (Elizabeth Gowans) - nominated
- Best Original Music - A Woman of Good Character (Mark Nicholas) - nominated
