= Ann Pacey =

New Zealand jazz singer

- Born: Ann Tarleton; August 11, 1941; United Kingdom
- Died: January 19, 2024 (aged 82)
- Occupation: Jazz singer

Ann Tarleton (11 August 1941 - 19 January 2024) was a Wellington based jazz singer professionally known as Ann Pacey. Pacey entertained Vietnam War personnel with her band the Māori Ambassadors from 20 December 1968 to 25 March 1969.

== Early life ==
Pacey was born in the United Kingdom before arriving by boat to New Zealand. She attended Wellington Technical College and after leaving school, she worked as a copywriter for The Evening Post.

== Vietnam War ==
The Māori Ambassadors, including Pacey, were recruited from the gig circuit in Australia and flew into Saigon (now Ho Chi Min City) in December 1968. The band immediately began work, performing two to three shows a day at Củ Chi Base in southern Vietnam.

When asked about what inspired her to join the war effort in Vietnam, Pacey stated that, “My mother had served in World War II and, although I didn't really know what to expect, I thought if it was good enough for her, it was good enough for me."

The band flew to different locations over the next three months in a tour across South East Asia. Several New Zealand bands, including the Ambassadors, alongside Māori Guin Tikis, the Māori Te Kiwis, the Māori Volcanics, the Māori Travellieres, were contracted by the United States Service Organisation to entertain US and allied personnel serving in Vietnam. Pacey recalled that these personnel “really liked hearing meaningful ballads, songs like (Sittin' On) The Dock of the Bay were popular."

Despite their success, the band were making US$500 a week which Pacey said they “didn’t think was enough, but there wasn’t much we could do about it.”

Pacey and the band were also subject to the same threats as military personnel. Pacey recalled returning to her villa after being away and finding a bullet hole in the wall by her bed where her head would have been. They were also told to watch out for bombs which were reportedly in rat traps around the camp.

== Post-war life ==
After her time in Vietnam, Pacey began her career in acting, stating that “there’s more of a challenge there”. In 1989 she was nominated for a Listener Film and TV Award for her role in Kiwi comedy movie Send a Gorilla. She also starred in the music show Rock around the Clock, played a milk bar owner in the TV series Peppermint Twist, and a cabinet minister in Pioneer Women. Pacey also organised casting for many adverts.

Pacey died on 19 January 2024 after a battle with dementia.

== Accomplishments ==
On 20 October 2016, at the age of 75, Ann Pacey represented her band at a Defence Force ceremony in Wellington to be recognised for her tour of duty. This was only the second time New Zealand had recognised wartime entertainers with medals.
