= Bruno Lawrence =

English-born New Zealand musician and actor (1941–1995)

- Bruno Lawrence
- Born: David Charles Lawrence; 12 February 1941; Worthing, West Sussex, England
- Died: 10 June 1995 (aged 54); Wellington, New Zealand
- Occupations: Actor, musician
- Years active: 1965–1995

David Charles Lawrence (12 February 1941 – 10 June 1995), known professionally as Bruno Lawrence, was an English-born New Zealand musician and actor who was active in the industry in New Zealand and Australia.

Initially notable as a musician and founder of the 1970s ensemble Blerta, he went on to well-regarded roles in several major films. His television work included starring in the 1990s era Australian satirical series Frontline.

== Early life ==
David Charles Lawrence was born in Brighton, United Kingdom on 12 February 1941. In 1946 at the age of five, he immigrated to New Zealand with his parents and sister Pat, settling in New Plymouth before relocating to Wellington in 1948.

Lawrence attended primary school in Karori, followed by Wellington Boys College. By the age of 14, he had acquired a drum kit, and discovered his passion for jazz music including Dizzy Gillespie, Dave Brubeck and Thelonious Monk. In 1955, while at high school, Lawrence participated in lunchtime music room jam sessions. The following year, he formed a Dixie band with school friends, playing at teenage dances at the local church hall. During this time, he earned the nickname 'Bruno'.

After leaving school, Lawrence's friends attended Victoria University and got involved with the University Jazz Club. Lawrence bluffed his way into university to play too. When it was discovered that he was not a student there, he was banned from attending classes, but managed to stay with the club from 1958 to 1960, gaining experience and musical education along the way.

Lawrence also competed in soccer and rugby in his youth.

== Career ==
=== Music ===
Lawrence was a jazz and rock drummer in numerous bands. In 1961, he joined jazz pianist Ronnie Smith's new band, with Tommy Tamati and Ricky May for about a year, playing the drums. In 1963, Lawrence drummed as a session musician for several bands, recorded jazz tracks for radio shows and formed a trio who appeared on television. He also played on records by New Zealand artists Peter Posa and Tommy Adderley. After playing with Neil Harrap in The Blockbusters, in 1964, Lawrence joined Harrap's new rock band, The Measles. The group stayed together for about a year.

In 1965, Lawrence released the single "Bruno Do That Thing", a cover of Willie Bobo’s hit "Bobo Do That Thing". The song found success and was a finalist in the Loxene Golden Disc Awards, and the name 'Bruno' stuck.

After moving to Sydney in 1966, Lawrence performed in Ricky May's resident television band. He was then signed to play with Max Merritt & The Meteors. The band moved to Melbourne, playing numerous venues and appearing on television. In 1966, they toured New Zealand, where they also appeared on the series Let's Go and recorded the single "Fanny Mae". Lawrence was fired after two years, due to drug and alcohol-fuelled behaviour.

Lawrence performed in two bands in Auckland, Lawrence returned to Wellington in 1967 and released the single "Mandy Jones" / "Don't Care", under his birth name, David Lawrence. The same year, he toured with Keil Isles, before relocating to Sydney to join The Electric Heap in 1968. He subsequently moved back to New Zealand and joined jazz band Quincy Conserve in 1969, writing their hit, "Ride the Rain", which was nominated for a 1970 Loxene Golden Disc Award.

After joining bands Fresh Air and Littlejohn for a short time in 1971, Lawrence formed Blerta (Bruno Lawrence’s Electric Revelation and Travelling Apparition), with former members of Fresh Air. The band released the hit single "Dance All Around the World". Lawrence remained with the band until 1985, touring New Zealand and Australia. He performed alongside fellow creatives he later with collaborated with as an actor, including director Geoff Murphy, and actors Martyn Sanderson and Ian Watkin. He then drummed with the Beaver Band in 1976, followed by a group called Spats for about six months.

In 1978, after learning to play the saxophone, Lawrence joined all-female band, Wide Mouthed Frogs, alongside Jenny Morris. In 1980, he returned to drumming, joining pop / new-wave band The Crocodiles with Morris. The band performed in Auckland and at the 1980 Sweetwaters Music Festival. An album and single, (both called "Tears") were released in 1980, and both reached number 17 on the national charts.

Over the next fifteen years Lawrence spent most of his time acting, but during that time, he played briefly in a jazz trio, supporting the 'State of the Nation' tour by a group of poets. In 1985, he performed with Peter Dasent (ex-Crocodiles), on a resident gig in Wellington. The same year, he joined Australian jazz singer Vince Jones on a short North Island tour.

Lawrence's last recording was with Bernie McGann, Larry Gales and Jonathan Crayford on "Jazz at the St. James" in 1989. The show was repeated in 1990, with the New Zealand String Quartet. Lawrence then formed a band with Jonathan Crayford called Jazzmin, playing in Wellington from 1990 to 1993. His last foray into music was in a band called Cracker.

=== Acting ===
In 1967, Lawrence directed and acted in some film projects with friends in Wellington, putting his music career on hiatus for a few months.

While performing with rock band Quincy Conserve, Lawrence appeared in 1969 television film Tank Busters. before starring in a television documentary called Time Out, which won him a 1970 Feltex Television Award for Best Actor. He then had a role in the television series Pukemanu.

After his time in the band The Crocodiles, Lawrence concentrated on his film career. After appearing in an episode of All Things Being Equal, director Roger Donaldson, cast him in his breakout lead role as Al Shaw in 1981 relationship drama Smash Palace. Playing a former race car driver who leaves with his daughter after the breakdown of his marriage, Lawrence won an award at the Manila Film Festival, and acclaim from American critic Pauline Kael. The same year, he had a cameo in Geoff Murphy's breakthrough film Goodbye Pork Pie, before appearing in Murphy's 1983 film Utu, about the New Zealand Wars of the 1860s.

The Los Angeles Times compared Lawrence's work in the 1984 drama film Heart of the Stag to that of "a young Brando". In 1985, further acclaim came with Lawrence's leading role as the lone scientist in Geoff Murphy's end-of-the-world tale, The Quiet Earth, for which he also helped write the script.

Conscious of over-exposure locally, Lawrence made several trips to Hollywood, but the US did not appeal to him, as he considered it too far from home.

Lawrence's Australian roles included playing a blind man in 1985 film An Indecent Obsession (an adaptation of the Colleen McCullough novel of the same name), and gun-loving robber, Cracka Park in 1986 miniseries The Great Bookie Robbery. In 1990, he portrayed John Peterson in the film, The Rogue Stallion. He then appeared in 1991 film Spotswood (aka The Efficiency Expert), alongside Anthony Hopkins, Ben Mendelsohn and Russell Crowe.

His other films credits included Wild Man (1977), Beyond Reasonable Doubt (1980), Race for the Yankee Zephyr (1981), Battletruck (1982), Prisoners (1982), A Woman of Good Character (1982), Carry Me Back (1982), Death Warmed Up (1984), Wild Horses (1985), Pallet on the Floor (1986), Bridge to Nowhere (1986), Initiation (1987), As Time Goes By (1988), Grievous Bodily Harm (1988), Rikky and Pete (1988), The Delinquents (1989), Jack Be Nimble (1993) and Gino (1994).

His final screen role was as devious, golf-loving TV producer Brian Thompson in 1990s satirical Australian TV series Frontline. At this time, he was also, working on the 1996 movie Cosi, but was unable to complete filming due to discovering his cancer diagnosis.

American actor Jack Nicholson considered Lawrence one of his favourite actors.

== Personal life ==
In 1965, while performing in Wellington, Lawrence met wife-to-be, Veronica, and the following year, she became pregnant. Lawrence left for Australia in October and Veronica followed early in the new year, the couple marrying in February 1966. Singer Ricky May was the best man.

The couple had five children. Their first child was born during Lawrence's time performing with Max Merritt & The Meteors. They had a second child in Wellington, before welcoming a third child in 1969 and a fourth in 1971.

Lawrence's children include son, Thad Lawrence who at the age of 16, worked on the set of 1983 film Utu, alongside his father (as lead actor) and mother (as location manager). Thad also appeared alongside his father in a 1975 television commercial for Crunchie.

After Blerta's 1974 tour, Lawrence and family set up base at a commune called 'Snoring Waters', in the Hawke's Bay community of Waimārama.

== Death ==
In 1994, while enjoying the success of the Australian television series Frontline, Lawrence was diagnosed with inoperable lung cancer. He died in Wellington, New Zealand, on 10 June 1995 at the age of 54. His Tangihanga (traditional Māori funeral ceremony) was held on 14 June 1995, at the Taupunga Marae, near Snoring Waters. He was the first non-tribal member to be buried there. Actor Sam Neill read out a tribute from John Clarke on the day.

A biography, Bruno: The Bruno Lawrence Story by Roger Booth, and television documentary Numero Bruno (2000, directed by Steve La Hood), both cover his life and work. Lawrence is also featured in compilation documentary Blerta Revisited (2001, directed by Geoff Murphy).

== Filmography ==
=== Film ===
Year	Title	Role	Notes	Ref.
1968	Hurry Hurry Faster Faster	Dr Brunowski	Short film Also director	
1969	The Box	The Robber	Short Film	
1977	Wild Man	Wild Man	Also producer / writer	
1980	Goodbye Pork Pie	Mulvaney		
1980	A Woman of Good Character	Younger Son		
1980	Beyond Reasonable Doubt	Pat Vesey		
1981	Smash Palace	Al Shaw	Also script advisor	
1981	Race for the Yankee Zephyr	Barker		
1982	Battletruck (aka Warlords of the 21st Century)	Willie		
1982	Carry Me Back	Motorway Traffic Cop		
1982	Prisoners	Peeky		
1982	A Point of View	Grant Goodman	Short Film	
1983	Utu	Williamson		
1984	Wild Horses	Tyson		
1984	Heart of the Stag	Peter	Also writer	
1984	Death Warmed Up	Tex		
1985	An Indecent Obsession	Matt Sawyer		
1985	The Quiet Earth	Zac Hobson	Also writer	
1986	Bridge to Nowhere	Mac		
1987	Initiation	Nat Molloy		
1988	Rikky and Pete	Sonny		
1988	As Time Goes By	Ryder		
1988	Grievous Bodily Harm	Det. Sgt. Ray Birch		
1989	The Delinquents	Bosun		
1989	O'Reilly's Luck	Jack, Dad	Short film	
1990	The Rogue Stallion	John Peterson		
1991	Spotswood (aka The Efficiency Expert)	Robert, Carey's Father		
1993	Jack Be Nimble	Teddy		
1994	Gino	Mr. Palizetti	Final film role	
2001	Blerta Revisited (aka Blerta – The Return Trip)	Various roles	Documentary film (archive footage); Also writer / original producer	

=== Television ===
Year	Title	Role	Notes	Ref.
1969	Tank Busters	Bruno	TV movie short	
1971	Time Out	Johnny O'Keefe	TV documentary	
1971	Pukemanu	Biker	Episode: "Pukemanu Welcomes You"	
1974	Percy the Policeman	Burglar Bill	5 episodes	
1974	Country Calendar	The Neighbour	Episode: "Fred Dagg"	
1975	Armchair Cinema	Bert	Episode 6: "Tully"	
1975–1983	Close to Home			
1976	Moynihan	Carpenter	1 episode: "You Can't Win 'Em All"	
1976	Blerta	The Wild Man	6 episodes Also producer / writer	
1976	Luke's Kingdom	Man at Inn	2 episodes	
1976	Epidemic	Shamrock	Miniseries, episode 1: "Hemi Te Koaka"	
1977	Three New Zealanders	Various roles	Episode: "Ngaio Marsh"	
1978	All Things Being Equal	Warwick	1 episode	
1979	The Neville Purvis Family Show	Various roles / Guru		
1980	The Mad Dog Gang Spooks Wilkie, Wink Wink and the Wobbler	Wink Wink	TV movie	
1980	A Woman of Good Character		TV movie	
1981	Jocko	Stan		
1982	Loose Enz	Ernest Lovelock	Anthology series, episode: "The Venus Touch"	
1982	Pallet on the Floor (aka Pallet on the Floor)	Ronald Hugh Morrieson	Also composer / music director	
1983	It's Lizzie to Those Close	Younger Son	TV movie	
1984	Welcome to Paradise	Tony Blackwood	TV movie	
1984	Inside Straight	Nick	Episode 7: "Card Game"	
1984	Special Squad	Arthur Poole	Episode 32: "Until Death"	
1985	Kaleidoscope – Roger Donaldson in Hollywood	Himself	TV documentary special	
1986	Pokerface	Ray 'Creepy' Crawley	Miniseries, 3 episodes	
1986	The Great Bookie Robbery	Cracka Park	Miniseries, 3 episodes	
1988	The Rainbow Warrior Conspiracy	Terry Batchelor	TV movie	
1989	Night of the Red Hunter	Ish Murdie	4 episodes	
1990	Winners	Thomas Barnes	1 episode	
1990	The Rogue Stallion	John Peterson	TV movie	
1990	Cowboys of Culture	Himself	TV documentary movie	
1990	Magic Kiwis – Bruno Do That Thing	Himself	TV special	
1992	The Rainbow Warrior	Terry Batchelor	TV movie	
1993	The Feds	Larry 'Icehouse' Porter	Miniseries, 1 episode	
1994	Frontline	Brian Thompson	13 episodes	
2000	Numero Bruno	Himself	TV special (archive footage)	

=== TVC ===
Year	Title	Role	Ref.
1975	Cadbury Crunchie – Great Crunchie Train Robbery	Man with no shirt	
1989	1990 Commonwealth Games promo – Join Together	Betting soldier	

== Theatre ==
Year	Title	Role	Notes	Ref.
1972	Sausage and Mash	Performer	Star Boating Club, Wellington with Blerta & Acme Sausage Company	
1980	The State of the Nation	Musician (drums)	Circa Theatre, Wellington	
1991	Henceforward...	Lupus (appears on video)	Circa Theatre, Wellington	

== Awards and nominations ==
Year	Work	Award	Category	Result	Ref.
1965	"Bruno Do That Thing"	Aotearoa Music Awards	Single of the Year	Nominated	
1965	"Bruno Do That Thing"	Loxene Golden Disc Awards	Best Song	Finalist	
1970	"Ride the Rain"	Loxene Golden Disc Awards	Best Song	Finalist	
1970	Time Out	Feltex Television Awards	Best Actor	Won	
1982	Smash Palace	Manila Film Festival	Best Actor	Won	
1986	The Quiet Earth	Fantafestival	Best Actor	Won	
1987	The Quiet Earth	New Zealand Film and TV Awards	Best Male Performance in a Leading Role (shared with Bill Baer and Sam Pillsbury)	Won	
1987	The Quiet Earth	New Zealand Film and TV Awards	Best Screenplay Adaptation	Won	
1988	Grievous Bodily Harm	Australian Film Institute Awards	Best Actor in a Supporting Role	Nominated	
1988	As Time Goes By	Fantafestival	Best Actor	Won	
1995	Bruno Lawrence	New Zealand Film and TV Awards	Rudall Hayward Award	Won	
