= Ian Watkin =

New Zealand actor (1940–2016)

- Born: 25 January 1940; New Zealand
- Died: 18 May 2016 (aged 76); Australia
- Occupation: Actor
- Years active: 1970–2006

Ian Watkin (25 January 1940 – 18 May 2016) was a New Zealand actor known for the films Braindead and Sleeping Dogs.

Watkin grew up in Greymouth, and started his career in theatre and radio plays, and working as a magazine editor before emigrating to Australia in 1999 where he continued to appear in numerous television and theatre roles and also became a wine broker. He was also known as Mr. Big Cheese due to a television commercial in which he appeared.

After having appeared in Pukemanu, he featured in an episode of Ngaio Marsh Theatre in 1977. His later roles included Star Wars: Episode II – Attack of the Clones and Charlotte's Web in 2006.

== Death ==
Ian Watkin died of cancer on 18 May 2016, aged 76.

== Selected filmography ==
- Pukemanu (1971–72) – Town doctor
- Sleeping Dogs (1977) – Dudley
- Wild Man (1977) – The Colonel
- Middle Age Spread (1979) – Wrightson
- A Woman of Good Character (1980) – Stock Buyer
- Goodbye Pork Pie (1980) – Father in Car
- Nutcase (1980) – Godzilla
- Bad Blood (1981) – Detective Sgt. Knight
- Beyond Reasonable Doubt (1982) – Kevin Ryan
- Carry Me Back (1982) – M.C.
- The Lost Tribe (1983) – Mears
- Utu (1984) – Doorman
- Death Warmed Up (1984) – Bill
- Pallet on the Floor (1984) – Amos
- Peppermint Twist (1987) - Clive Springer
- Send a Gorilla (1988)
- Just Me and Mario (1988)
- Space Knights (1989)
- My Grandpa Is a Vampire (1992) – Father Vincent
- Braindead (1992) – Uncle Les
- Savage Honeymoon (2000) – Frank
- Star Wars: Episode II – Attack of the Clones (2002) – COO-2180 (uncredited)
- Charlotte's Web (2006) – Fair Official (final film role)
