= Off the Edge =

1976 New Zealand skiing documentary film

- Directed by: Michael Firth
- Written by: Molly Gregory
- Produced by: Michael Firth
- Starring: Jeff Campbell; Blair Trenholme
- Narrated by: Ron Hajek; Ron Roy
- Cinematography: Geoff Cocks
- Edited by: Michael Economou
- Production company: Pentacle Films
- Distributed by: Kerridge Odeon
- Release date: 1976
- Running time: 77 minutes
- Country: New Zealand
- Language: English

Off the Edge is a 1976 New Zealand documentary film directed by Michael Firth. It was nominated for an Academy Award for Best Documentary Feature. The film features backcountry skiing, extreme skiing and hang gliding in the Southern Alps. Despite being classed as a documentary, it does have some semblance of a fictionalised storyline.
