= Phillip Gordon (actor) =

New Zealand actor

- Born: ~1959
- Occupation: Actor
- Notable work: Came a Hot Friday, The Returning, Bridge to Nowhere, Inside Straight

Phillip Gordon is a New Zealand actor. He played the lead roles of Cyril Kidman in Came a Hot Friday, Alan Steadman in The Returning, Leon in Bridge to Nowhere, and Steve Keenan in Inside Straight. He won the Best New Talent award at the Feltex Television Awards in 1985 for the latter.

Gordon's first acting job was as a child, touring Australian with a stage production of Oliver!. At 16 years old he played Hugh Clifford on the TV series Close to Home after which he studied drama with Theatre Corporate. Other screen appearances include in Terry and the Gunrunners and Simone de Beauvoir's Babies.
