= Tony Barry =

Australian actor (1941–2022)

- Born: 28 August 1941; Ipswich, Queensland, Australia
- Died: 21 December 2022 (aged 81); Murwillumbah, New South Wales, Australia
- Occupation: actor
- Years active: 1968–2022
- Children: 1

Tony Barry (28 August 1941 – 21 December 2022) was an Australian actor known for television and film roles.

== Personal life ==
Barry was born in Ipswich, Queensland, on 28 August 1941. He had one son. Barry is the only Australian to be featured on a New Zealand postage stamp. He took part in political rallies, was a volunteer for indigenous rights groups and visited high schools to promote environmentalism.

=== Health ===
Barry was diagnosed with melanoma in the early 2000s. In 2014, between seasons of the television drama series The Time of Our Lives, Barry had his left leg amputated above the knee due to the illness. The loss of his leg was written into the storyline. Due to this illness, he died on 21 December 2022, at age 81, in Murwillumbah, New South Wales.

== Career ==
Barry performed in nearly 60 feature films and over 45 television series, across a five-decade career, in both Australia and New Zealand. The longevity of Barry's acting career was recognised when he received the 2014 Film Critics Circle of Australia award for his "extraordinary contribution to the Australian film industry".

After acting in the television series The Box from 1975 to 1976, Barry began his film career in 1977 with The Mango Tree. Roles followed in a range of Australian and New Zealand films, including Newsfront, Goodbye Pork Pie, The Odd Angry Shot, We of the Never Never, Australia and Home for Christmas, for which he won Best Actor in the 2010 New Zealand Film and TV Awards.

Barry's last television appearance was in season one of ABC drama Bay of Fires in 2023.

== Filmography ==
=== Film ===
Year	Title	Role	Notes
1976	Break of Day	Joe	Feature film
1977	The Mango Tree	Tommy Smith	Feature film
1978	Newsfront	"Greasy"	Feature film
1978	Little Boy Lost	Constable O'Day	Feature film
1979	The Odd Angry Shot	Black Ronnie	Feature film
1980	Beyond Reasonable Doubt	Detective John Hughes	Feature film
1980	Hard Knocks	Barry	Feature film
1980	The Earthling	'Red'	Feature film
1981	Goodbye Pork Pie	John	Feature film
1982	We of the Never Never	Mac	Feature film
1982	With Prejudice	Adams	Feature film
1982	Now and Then	Marina manager	
1982	Dead Easy	Ozzie	Feature film
1982	The Settlement	Sergeant Crow	Feature film
1982	Midnite Spares	Detective Howard	Feature film
1984	Pallet on the Floor	Larkman	Feature film
1985	Shout! The Story of Johnny O'Keefe	Alan Heffernan	TV movie
1985	Archer's Adventure	Squatter	TV movie
1985	The Coca-Cola Kid	Bushman	Feature film
1986	The Surfer	Calhoun	Feature film
1986	Two Friends	Charlie	Feature film
1986	I Own the Racecourse	Bert Hammond	TV movie
1986	BabaKiueria	Father (Mr. Smith)	Feature film
1986	Frog Dreaming	Gazza	Feature film
1987	Initiation	Pat	Feature film
1988	Shame	Tim Curtis	Feature film
1988	Never Say Die	Det Insp Bill Evans	Feature film
1988	The Man from Snowy River II	Jacko	Feature film
1990	Breaking Through	Rob, Ann's husband	TV film
1991	Old Scores	Barry Brown	TV movie
1992	Deadly	Deputy Commissioner Graham Stewart	Feature film
1993	Absent Without Leave	Peter	Feature film
1993	Jack Be Nimble	Clarrie	Feature film
1993	Rainbow Warrior	Greenpeace activist	TV movie
1994	The Last Tattoo	James Patrick Carroll	Feature film
1994	Country Life	Logger	Feature film
1995	Vacant Possession	Salvation Army man	Feature film
1997	Road to Nhill	Jim	Feature film
1997	Doing Time for Patsy Cline	Dwayne	Feature film
1999	Paperback Hero	Mack	Feature film
1999	Fresh Air	Bob	Feature film
2000	Mullet	Col Maloney	Feature film
2003	The Night We Called It a Day	Ralph Blue	Feature film
2003	BlackJack: Murder Archive	Joe Bueneroti	TV film
2005	Lady Vengeance	Jenny's adoptive father	Feature film
2006	Home by Christmas		
2006	Solo	Louis	Feature film
2006	Final Call	Boss	Short film
2006	Hunt Angels	Burly Detective	Feature film
2006	Pleasance	Errol	
2006	Gone	Ute driver	
2007	Cross Life	Bill	
2007	Almost	Dr Khan	
2008	Battle of Coal	Ben Chifley	TV movie
2008	Australia	Sergeant Callaghan	Feature film
2009	The Ballard of Betty and Joe	Joe	Short film
2009	Devotion		Short film
2009	Devotion	Narrator	Short film
2010	Home By Christmas	Ed	
2010	Providence Park	Man with Flowers	Short film
2011	Rest for the Wicked	Murray	
2013	The Caretaker	The Promoter	Short film
2013	Mystery Road	Sarge	Feature film
2017	Nobody's Child	Hank	Short film
2018	Grace	Mr Symonds	Short film
2022	Seriously Red	Gramps	

=== Television ===
Year	Title	Role	Notes
1968	Skippy		TV series
1972	Behind the Legend		TV series
1971-72	Pukemanu	Dan Harrigan	TV series, 6 episodes
1973	Certain Women		TV series
1974	Buck House	Joe Donovan	TV series, 6 episodes
1975	Armchair Cinema	Mack	TV series, 1 episode
1975–76	The Box	Doug Jackson	TV series, 2 episodes
1976	Blerta	Morgan	TV series, 4 episodes
1976	Luke's Kingdom	Man at Inn	TV series, 3 episodes
1976	Power Without Glory	Maurice	TV series, 1 episode
1981	I Can Jump Puddles	Alan's father	TV series
1982	A Country Practice	Bernie Peterson	TV series, 2 episodes
1983	Scales of Justice	"Nipper" Jackson	TV miniseries
1983	The Dismissal	Press Secretary	TV miniseries
1983	Cyclone Tracy	Mick Brennan	TV miniseries
1989	Shadow of the Cobra		TV miniseries
1995	Rose Against the Odds	Jack Rennie	TV miniseries
1996	Crocadoo	Rufus B. Hardacare	TV series
	Halifax f.p.		TV series
2002	Heroes' Mountain	Steve Diver	TV movie
2003	All The Way		TV series
1996-06	All Saints	Ross / Frank	TV series, 4 episodes
2009	The Diplomat	The Libertine	TV movie
2009	Dirt Game	Alec Nolan	TV series, 3 episodes
2011	Paper Giants: The Birth of Cleo	Sir Frank Packer	TV series, 2 episodes
2011	Wild Boys	George Jenkins	TV series, 2 episodes
2012	Rake	Father McGuire	TV series, 2 episodes
2013-14	The Time of Our Lives	Ray Tivoli	TV series, 16 episodes
2014	Lessons from the Grave	Ghost	TV series, 1 episode
2018-20	Harrow	Jack Twine	TV series, 6 episodes
2019	Total Control	Phillip Anderson	TV series, 2 episodes
2020	The End	Willie	TV series, 4 episodes
2023	Bay of Fires	Joseph	TV series, 4 episodes

== Live theatre ==
Year	Title	Role	Notes
2004	A Local Man	Former Prime Minister Ben Chifley	One-person drama on Chifley's last night
