= Iowa, Iowa =

Iowa, Iowa can refer to:

- Iowa City, Iowa
- Iowa County, Iowa
- Any of several townships in Iowa; see Iowa Township (disambiguation) § Iowa

== See also ==
- Iowa (disambiguation)
- List of U.S. cities named after their state
