= Lowa =

Lowa may refer to:

- Lowa (Kivu/Maniema), a tributary of the Lualaba in DR Congo in the Kivu and Maniema provinces
- Lowa (Katanga), a tributary of the Lualaba in DR Congo in the Katanga Province, better known as Luvua
- Lowa Health Zone, a health zone of the Democratic Republic of the Congo.
- Lowa District, a district of the Belgian Congo
- Lowa Khatsa, a dish in Tibetan cuisine
- Lowa language, one of the variants of Central Tibetan
- LOWA, a German footwear brand owned since 1993 by the Tecnica Group
- A misspelling of Iowa

== See also ==
- Iowa (disambiguation)
