= ECZ =

ECZ may refer to:

- UCI code for Coldeportes Zenú
- Équipe cadre de la zone, zonal management team for Health zones in the Democratic Republic of the Congo
- Église du Christ au Zaïre, former name of the Church of Christ in the Congo
- Electoral Commission of Zambia, public body of Zambia
- Short name for Eczacıbaşı S.K., Turkish sports club
