= The Scarecrow (1982 film) =

- Directed by: Sam Pillsbury
- Written by: Michael Heath, Sam Pillsbury
- Based on: The Scarecrow by Ronald Hugh Morrieson
- Produced by: Robert Whitehouse
- Starring: John Carradine; Jonathan Smith; Tracy Mann; Daniel McLaren
- Cinematography: James Bartle
- Edited by: Ian John
- Music by: Andrew Hagen, Morton Wilson, Phil Broadhurst
- Release date: 1982
- Running time: 87 minutes
- Country: New Zealand
- Language: English

The Scarecrow is a 1982 New Zealand film, also known as Klynham Summer in America. It was directed by Sam Pillsbury based on the 1963 horror novel by New Zealand author Ronald Hugh Morrieson.

== Plot ==
Set in the fictitious New Zealand small town of Klynham in the early 1950s, teenagers Ned Poindexter (Jonathan Smith) and his friend Les (Daniel McLaren) start raising chickens, only to have them stolen. While stealing them back from Victor, the school bully, they inadvertently cross the path of a murderer who had slain a girl in the woods.

When more girls in the town are killed, and Ned's 16-year old sister, Prudence (Tracy Mann) becomes the new target, Ned begins to suspect that an unsettling town newcomer – travelling magician and hypnotist Hubert Salter (John Carradine), who is living at the undertaker’s place, is responsible. Meanwhile. the police suspect Ned’s alcoholic uncle, Athol.

Prudence’s friend Angela goes missing, and the Fitzherbert mansion is burned to the ground, killing Mr Fitzherbert. Angela’s dead body is found, having been raped and murdered.

Ned’s older brother Herbert goes into Dabney’s funeral parlor to play cards with Dabney and Athol. Dabney accuses Athol of stealing brandy, but they hear an empty bottle clink.

Prudence doesn’t come home the next day. Ned, convinced Pru is in trouble, fetches officer Ramsbottom. As they search around town, Ned finds a piece of Salter’s bow tie, and they go to the dump to ask Dabney. The trio keep silent, eventually revealing that Salter is staying at the funeral parlor. Ramsbottom searches through Dabney’s, finding a hidden backroom containing Sam’s body, as well as a bound and gagged Prudence.

A flashback shows what happened at the funeral parlor. When they hear the bottle clink, the three investigate, finding Salter hiding in the back. They fight, and Salter is killed in the struggle. They were at the dump to bury Salter’s body. They, as well as Prudence, know what really happened, and keep it a secret.

The tagline for the film was: "The same night our fowls were taken, Daphne Moran had her throat cut".

According to Sam Edwards the film is not as bleak as the novel. Small-town New Zealand in the 1950s is puritanical on the surface but depraved to its depths.

== Cast ==
- Jonathan Smith as Ned Poindexter
- Tracy Mann as Prudence Poindexter
- Daniel McLaren as Les Wilson
- John Carradine as Hubert Salter
- Bruce Allpress as Uncle Athol
- Philip Holder as Constable Ramsbottom
- Stephen Taylor as Herbert Poindexter
- Desmond Kelly as Mr. Poindexter
- Anne Flannery as Mrs. Poindexter
- Denise O'Connell as Angela Potroz
- Jonathan Hardy as Charlie Dabney
- Martyn Sanderson as Ned as Adult (voice)
- Greer Robson as Lynette
- Roy Billing as Mr. Potroz
- Greg Naughton as Victor Lynch
- Mark Hadlow as Sam Finn

== Awards ==
Year	Award	Category	Result
1982	Cannes Film Festival	Official Selection – Director’s Fortnight Section (out of competition)	Selected
1983	New Zealand Music Awards	Film Soundtrack of the Year: Schtung	Nominated
1982	Mystfest (Italy)	Best Artistic Contribution: (ensemble cast)	Won
1982	Mystfest (Italy)	Best Film	Nominated

The Scarecrow was the first film from New Zealand to win official selection at the Cannes Film Festival.

== Production ==
The Scarecrow was part of the wave of New Zealand cinema that followed the establishment of the New Zealand Film Commission in 1978.

It was filmed in 1981 in Auckland and Thames and was produced by the National Film Unit and Oasis Films.

== Reception ==
Helen Martin in New Zealand film, 1912-1996 wrote "The narrative is at times confusing and disjointed. Consummate Hollywood character actor John Carradine [...] is well supported by the large cast, although the Lynch gang look too old for their roles" The Press's Hans Petrovic said a "mixture of tongue-in-cheek horror and humour [...] runs through this slightly flawed but very entertaining New Zealand production." Richard Scheib at Moira gave it 3 1/2 stars and said "The Scarecrow's problem is that it suffers from a rare form of cinematic excess – too much of a good thing – the subplots and character sketches dominate the plot to the point of confusion. Even the climax only takes place in a flashback afterwards."
