= Yaleko Health Zone =

Health zone in Tshopo Province, DR Congo

Yaleko Health Zone Zone de santé de Yaleko
- Health zone
- Country: Democratic Republic of the Congo
- Province: Tshopo
- Territory: Opala Territory
- Time zone: UTC+2 (CAT)

Yaleko Health Zone (French: Zone de santé de Yaleko, often abbreviated ZdS Yaleko) is a health zone in Opala Territory, Tshopo Province, in the Democratic Republic of the Congo.

It is one of two health zones in Opala Territory, along with Opala Health Zone. The zone has a general reference hospital and 21 health centres. The Yaleko reference hospital has a capacity of 100 beds, of which 40 were installed. The health zone covers two sectors of the territory and the part of Balinga-Lindja Sector not covered by Opala Health Zone.

Yaleko Health Zone has been reported in humanitarian and public-health updates, including a Médecins Sans Frontières measles response in 2012, local vaccination days following the detection of a type-2 vaccine-derived poliovirus case in 2016, and a 2026 long-lasting insecticidal net distribution plan for Tshopo Province.
