= Iowa (disambiguation) =

Iowa is a state of the United States.

Iowa may also refer to:

== People ==
- Iowa people, a Native American Siouan people
- Iowa Tribe of Kansas and Nebraska, a federally recognized Indian tribe
- Iowa Tribe of Oklahoma, a federally recognized Indian tribe

== Places in the United States ==
- Iowa River, a tributary of the Mississippi River
- Iowa, Louisiana, a town
- Iowa City, Iowa
- Iowa Colony, Texas
- Iowa County, Iowa
- Iowa County, Wisconsin
- Iowa Township (disambiguation)

== Buildings ==
- Iowa Building, listed on the National Register of Historic Places in Linn County, Iowa
- Hotel Iowa, listed on the National Register of Historic Places in Lee County, Iowa

== Schools ==
- University of Iowa
- Iowa State University
- University of Northern Iowa

== Music ==
- IOWA (music group), a musical trio from Mogilyov
- Iowa (album), a 2001 album by Slipknot
  - "Iowa", the last song from the album
- "Iowa", a traditional song from the 1966 album Sixteen Tons of Bluegrass by Pete Stanley and Wizz Jones
- "Iowa", a song from the 1995 Tangerine Dream album The Dream Mixes
- "Iowa (Travelling III)", a song from the 2001 Dar Williams album Mortal City
- "Iowa", a song from the 1999 John Linnell album State Songs

== Ships ==
- USS Iowa, various US Navy ships
- Iowa-class battleship
- SS Iowa, built 1902 as livestock transport, WW I troop ship, sunk as additional breakwater ship Normandy July 1944
- SS Iowa (1920), a steamship which sank in 1936, killing 34 crew and passengers
- Iowa (steamboat), a steamboat built in 1838; also later ships bearing the same name

== Other uses ==
- Episcopal Diocese of Iowa
- IOWA, a 2005 independent neo-noir film

== See also ==
- Aiwa
