= Idiofa Health Zone =

Health zone in Kwilu Province, DR Congo

Idiofa Health Zone Zone de santé d'Idiofa
- Health zone
- Country: Democratic Republic of the Congo
- Province: Kwilu
- Territory: Idiofa
- Time zone: UTC+2 (CAT)

Idiofa Health Zone (French: Zone de santé d'Idiofa, often abbreviated ZS Idiofa or ZdS Idiofa) is a health zone in Idiofa Territory, Kwilu Province, in the Democratic Republic of the Congo.

Idiofa Health Zone has been reported in humanitarian and public-health updates, including measles response activities and malaria prevention campaigns.

Its population was listed as 210,171 in a 2013 Ministry of Public Health document.

== See also ==
- Health zone (Democratic Republic of the Congo)
