= Daniel G. C. Wu =

Chinese American priest and missionary

Rev. Daniel G.C. Wu
- Born: Ng Gee Ching; 1883; China
- Died: 1956; California
- Church: Episcopal Church (United States)

Daniel Gee Ching Wu (October 19, 1883–April 6, 1956), an Episcopal priest and missionary, became a leader among Chinese Americans, especially in the San Francisco Bay Area.

== Biography ==
Ng Gee Ching, born in China in 1883, arrived as a child in Honolulu, Hawaii. Initially lukewarm toward Christianity, he agreed to assist deaconess Emma Drant, who taught him English in exchange for him teaching her Cantonese and assisting the Chinese community in Hawaii. Inspired by Drant's faith, he converted to Christianity, and took "Daniel" as a colloquial name on his baptism as well as changed his surname to "Wu", which is the Mandarin pronunciation of his name, and which Americans not of Chinese descent could pronounce more easily.

== Career ==
When Drant moved to the San Francisco Bay area in 1905 to assist the Chinese community by establishing the True Sunshine Episcopal mission in San Francisco, California, Wu initially remained in Hawaii. However, after the 1906 San Francisco earthquake (which with the resulting fires, killed 3,000 people and destroyed 80% of the city), he responded to her call for help with the mainland community. Chinese immigrants were especially hard hit, and many moved from Chinatown across the bay to Oakland, California where Drant and Wu established another church, which became known as the Church of Our Saviour.

While helping to manage both missions (since Drant soon left for another assignment in the East), Wu also studied for the priesthood at the Church Divinity School of the Pacific. Upon his ordination in 1912, Wu became vicar of both missions, which thrived despite the racial discrimination and other hardships still faced by congregation members.

In 1913, after a three-year courtship, Wu married King Yoak Won (1890-1982), the granddaughter of immigrants from Toi San county in what became southern Guangdong Province, and whose father (by then deceased) had arrived during the California Gold Rush and worked to build railroads. They met in the church, as King Yoak Won (introduced to Christianity by a Chinese Methodist missionary and baptised in a Congregationalist church) was helping roll bandages for the army led by Sun Yat Sen. After a large ceremony conducted in Chinese and English in Grace Cathedral, the Wus eventually had four children.

Wu frequented the port of entry, making contact with newly arrived, many of them Cantonese people. He assisted their transition to their new home and culture, while helping them and their children maintain their Chinese identity and heritage. Wu and his wife King Yoak Won (and the two congregations) offered English and sewing classes for adults, as well as Chinese language classes for children. About 250 persons attended the daily classes at each school. In 1933, with the assistance of All Saints Church, Palo Alto, another Chinese Sunday school began, which in three years had grown from 15 to 45 children. King Yoak Won Wu also assisted immigrants through the Chinese YWCA, founded in 1916 and on whose board of directors she participated for many years.

== Death and legacy ==
Wu retired from both his congregations in 1944, and they called the Rev. Clarence Lee from Canada to succeed him as vicar. He died on April 6, 1956. His wife King Yoak Wu survived him by 26 years, and one of their daughters married an Episcopal priest.

Although the first two Chinese missions of the Episcopal Church, founded in 1874 in Carson, Nevada and the following year in Nevada City, both folded as a result of the Chinese Exclusion Act of 1882, both congregations that Wu shepherded survive to this day, albeit in different locations. They now offer services in English, Cantonese and Mandarin, as well as continue to offer language and sewing classes. Furthermore, the Chinese YWCA, which King Yoak Wu helped found, continues to this day as well, although the original building (designed by Julia Morgan) is now the Chinese Historical Society of America.
