= Sam Pillsbury =

American film director and producer

- Born: Waterbury, Connecticut, US
- Occupations: Director, producer

Sam Pillsbury is an American film director, producer, and winemaker.

== Life and career ==
Massachusetts-raised Sam Pillsbury immigrated to New Zealand at the age of 14. At age 23 he began working for the government-owned National Film Unit of New Zealand, joining a group of emerging filmmakers who were investigating new subjects and creative film making styles.

Pillsbury directed seven films at the National Film Unit, including a multi-faceted study of artist Ralph Hotere, and Men and Supermen, a satirical look at workplace relations. He was also part of the directing team on the Commonwealth Games chronicle Games '74, and worked both on set and at the editing bench for Paul Maunder's Gone Up North for a While.

Pillsbury embarked on a solo career in 1975. His documentary, Birth with R.D. Laing, garnered awards in both Australia and New Zealand, while also generating controversy in England and the United States. The film prominently showcased the outspoken Scottish psychiatrist, R.D. Laing, as he critiqued the Western medical approach to childbirth. Pillsbury also worked on four documentaries for TV programme Seven Days, which variously looked into life for a solo mother, an ex-convict, hospital patients, and young Māori in the city.

Pillsbury made his dramatic debut in 1978, with the short drama Against the Lights. Based on a Witi Ihimaera short story, it examined an attack on a Māori taxi driver from multiple points of view. Pillsbury's 1980 short documentary, The Greatest Run on Earth, captured the 1980 edition of Auckland's Round the Bays fun run, and won awards at festivals in Chicago and Turin.

In 1981 Pillsbury directed his first feature, the horror film The Scarecrow, known as Klynham Summer in America. Based on the gothic novel by Ronald Hugh Morrieson, the film chronicles the arrival in a nineteen-fifties town of a murderous stranger (played by American film legend John Carradine), and the two teenage boys who inadvertently get in his way. In 1982, it became the first New Zealand film accepted to Cannes Film Festival, in the non-competitive Director's Fortnight section.

Pillsbury bought the rights to and worked extensively on a screen adaptation of apocalyptic sci-fi novel The Quiet Earth, before handing the project to director Geoff Murphy. Pillsbury directed a miniseries adaptation of the 1880s immigrant tale Heart of the High Country, based on a novel by Elizabeth Gowans, in which Scottish actress Valerie Gogan played an immigrant servant stuck in New Zealand. His next film was the period road movie Starlight Hotel, which starred Greer Robson as a teenage runaway exploring 1930s New Zealand with an unemployed man played by Peter Phelps. Though poorly distributed, it was met with acclaim by Los Angeles Times critic Kevin Thomas.

After directing two episodes of the Fox legal drama Against the Law in 1990, Pillsbury made his American feature debut with the erotic thriller Zandalee, starring Nicolas Cage, Judge Reinhold, and Erika Anderson. Released straight to video by Live Home Video in 1991, it received negative reviews.

Following Zandalee's financial and critical failure, Pillsbury began a period of directing American television films, including Into the Badlands (1991), Eyes of Terror (1994), Sins of Silence (1996), and A Mother's Instinct, before returning to the silver screen in 1997 with Free Willy 3: The Rescue. Though a financial failure, the film received some positive reviews, including from critic Roger Ebert, who praised the film for returning "to some of the human elements that made the first movie so good." In 1998, Pillsbury directed Kirsten Dunst in the Lifetime television film Fifteen and Pregnant.

He returned to New Zealand in 2000 to direct Crooked Earth, about a Māori soldier, played by Temuera Morrison who returns home after twenty years to bury his chieftain father; in the process he clashes with his militant drug-dealing brother, played by Lawrence Makoare, over who fill their fathers' shoes. Pillsbury returned to America to direct the 2003 Disney film Where The Red Fern Grows and the 2009 road movie Endless Bummer.

== Winemaker ==
Pillsbury has a second career as a winemaker. In 2000 he and a business partner planted a vineyard in Cochise County, Arizona, and in 2006 sold it to a group headed by Maynard James Keenan. Pillsbury Wine Company was launched soon afterwards, with his new vineyard & tasting room across the road in Willcox, Arizona, and a tasting room in Old Town Cottonwood, Arizona.

Pillsbury Wine has earned several national awards including Gold Medals in the Jefferson Cup, and several Double Gold Medals in the San Francisco Chronicle Wine Competition.

== Personal life ==
Pillsbury's wife is the daughter of sculptor Geny Dignac.

== Selected filmography ==
- The Scarecrow (1982)
- The Quiet Earth (1985, producer only)
- Heart of the High Country (1985)
- Starlight Hotel (1987)
- Zandalee (1991)
- Into the Badlands (1991) (TV)
- The President's Child (1992) (TV)
- Knight Rider 2010 (1994) (TV)
- Eyes of Terror (1994) (TV)
- Search for Grace (1994) (TV)
- Shadows of Desire (1994) (TV)
- Between Love and Honor (1995) (TV)
- Sins of Silence (1996) (TV)
- A Mother's Instinct (1996) (TV)
- Thrill (1996) (TV)
- Free Willy 3: The Rescue (1997)
- Fifteen and Pregnant (1998) (TV)
- Secret of Giving (1999) (TV)
- Crooked Earth (2001)
- The Wedding Dress (2001) (TV)
- Morgan's Ferry (2001)
- Taking Back Our Town (2001) (TV)
- Where the Red Fern Grows (2003)
- Audrey's Rain (2003) (TV)
- The King and Queen of Moonlight Bay (2003) (TV)
- Raising Waylon (2004) (TV)
- Endless Bummer (2009)
