= Christmas Snow =

Christmas Snow may refer to:

- "Christmas Snow" (South Park), 2019 TV episode
- A Christmas Snow, 2010 film
- Christmas "Chrissy" Snow, a character in Three's Company
- White Christmas (weather)
