= Muse Watson =

American actor (born 1948)

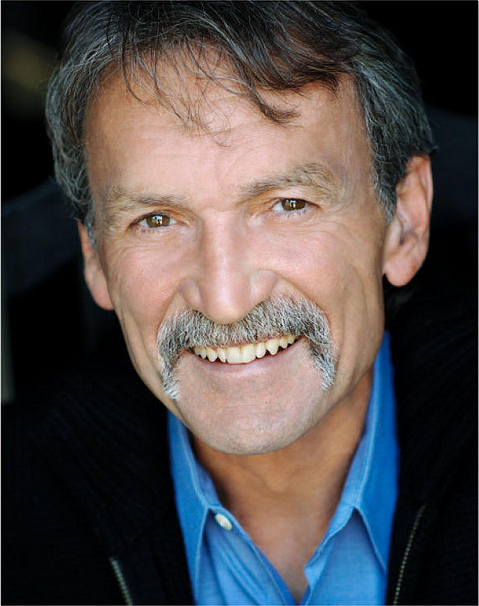
- Watson in March 2009
- Born: Robert Gravel; July 20, 1948 (age 78); Alexandria, Louisiana, U.S.
- Education: Louisiana Tech University; Berea College
- Occupation: Actor
- Years active: 1988–present
- Children: 1

Muse Watson Gravel (born Robert Gravel; July 20, 1948), commonly known as Muse Watson, is an American actor. He is notable for his recurring roles of Mike Franks on NCIS and Charles Westmoreland / D.B. Cooper in Prison Break, and film roles as Hank Corrigan in Something to Talk About, and Ben Willis, the killer in I Know What You Did Last Summer and I Still Know What You Did Last Summer.

== Early life ==
Watson was born and raised in Alexandria, Louisiana. His father died when he was five years old, and Watson and his three siblings were raised by their mother and maternal grandfather. Watson said his grandfather had a big influence on him, and after finding out that Robert Gravel was already registered with the Screen Actors Guild, he legally changed his name to Muse Watson Gravel, in honor of his grandfather. Watson graduated from Bolton High School in 1966, and then attended Louisiana Tech for two years on a music scholarship. After leaving Louisiana Tech, he transferred to Berea College in Berea, Kentucky.

It was at Berea College where he became interested in acting, scoring a role as Petruchio in The Taming of the Shrew. He then left Berea and went on the road starring in productions of Man of La Mancha and Promises, Promises. After a year of touring, he returned to Berea, but at graduation time, he was told his degree would be withheld because he hadn't "gone to church enough". He decided to leave school and moved to Oak Ridge, Tennessee to live with his sister. He worked for Pathway Bellows for seven years before moving to Chattanooga, Tennessee to work as a manufacturing representative, while still making time for auditions and plays.

== Career ==
Watson is credited with appearing in more than 60 movies and 50 television episodes. He is best known for his recurring roles of Mike Franks on NCIS and Charles Westmoreland in Prison Break, and as Ben Willis, the killer in the horror films, I Know What You Did Last Summer and I Still Know What You Did Last Summer, and as the vampire C. W. Niles in From Dusk Till Dawn 2.

Other notable appearances include: American Outlaws, Austin Powers: The Spy Who Shagged Me, A Day Without a Mexican, Dead Birds, Down in the Valley, IOWA, Morgan's Ferry and Songcatcher.

When Watson was living in Chattanooga, he was hired to do extras casting for King Kong Lives. He also made connections with people in the North Carolina film industry and became a Teamster, building his own fleet of trucks that he hired out for productions on the East Coast. After a guest appearance on Matlock and his role in Something to Talk About, he moved to Los Angeles where Marion Dougherty helped him in obtaining an agent. Watson said he considers his appearance in the film Something to Talk About as his "breakout role".

He has also directed theater for the Tennessee Performing Arts Center and the Bessie Smith Foundation, taught acting at the Georgia State Prison, and taught reading and writing at Berea College's literacy outreach program. Before changing his name to Muse Watson, he had credits as Robert Gravel, working as a stunt driver in Steel Magnolias and Mississippi Burning. In the film I Know What You Did Last Summer, Watson performed the majority of his own stunts, which included a very long underwater sequence.

In 2002, he was nominated for best supporting actor for his role in If I Die Before I Wake at the Fangoria Chainsaw Awards, and in 2011, won best actor for his performance in A Christmas Snow, at the Trail Dance Film Festival.

Watson starred in a stage adaptation of the TV movie A Christmas Snow at the Starlite Theater in Branson, Missouri.

In 2007, Watson made a guest appearance on Ghost Whisperer in the episode "Delia's First Ghost"; the episode reunited with his I Know What You Did Last Summer co-star and series star Jennifer Love Hewitt, who plays Melinda Gordon on the show.

== Personal life ==
Watson is married and has a daughter with autism, for which he has become an advocate.

== Filmography ==
Films
Year	Title	Role	Notes	Refs
1988	Mississippi Burning		Stunt driver	
1989	Steel Magnolias		Stunt driver	
1989	Black Rainbow	Patrol officer		
1990	The Handmaid's Tale	Guardian		
1990	Blind Vengeance	Varsac		
1993	Sommersby	Drifter		
1995	Something to Talk About	Hank Corrigan		
1995	The Journey of August King	Zimmer		
1995	Assassins	Ketcham		
1997	I Know What You Did Last Summer	Ben Willis		
1997	Rosewood	Henry Andrews		
1997	Lolita	Store clerk		
1997	Acts of Betrayal	Trenton Fraser		
1997	A Texas Birthday			
1998	Break Up	Baker cop		
1998	I Still Know What You Did Last Summer	Ben Willis		
1998	Shadrach	Captain		
1998	If I Die before I Wake	Daryl		
1999	From Dusk Till Dawn 2: Texas Blood Money	C. W. Niles		
1999	The Art of the Bullet	Captain Walters		
1999	Austin Powers: The Spy Who Shagged Me	Klansman		
1999	It's the Rage	Cleaner		
2000	Songcatcher	Parley Gentry		
2000	Ten Grand	Big Tony		
2001	Morgan's Ferry	Sheriff Billy Ray Barnwell		
2001	American Outlaws	Burly detective		
2002	Hollywood Vampyr	Professor Fulton		
2003	Season of the Hunted	Frank		
2003	Wild Turkey		Short film	
2004	Christmas Child	Sheriff Jimmy James		
2004	Frankenfish	Elmer		
2004	Dead Birds	Father		
2004	The Last Summer	Jerimiah Shuman		
2004	A Day Without a Mexican	Louis McClaire		
2004	The Dark Agent and the Passing of the Torch Chapter	Lester King		
2005	House of Grimm			
2005	Down in the Valley	Bill Sr.		
2005	IOWA	Sheriff Walker		
2005	End of the Spear	Adolfo		
2009	White Lightnin'	D. Ray White		
2009	Stellina Blue			
2009	Timer	Rick O'Leary		
2010	Small Town Saturday Night			
2010	The Presence	Mr. Browman		
2010	The Steamroom	Pat		
2011	The Lamp	Sam		
2012	Meeting Evil	Frank		
2013	The Last Exorcism Part II	Frank Merle		
2014	Between the Sand and the Sky	Boss		
2014	Suburban Gothic	Ambrose		
2016	Dark Resonance	Professor Walter Jackson		
2016	Saved From Sorrow: Mysterious Grace	Jeremiah		
2017	Valley of Bones	Terry		
2019	The Dead Ones	Gus		

Television
Year	Title	Role	Notes	Refs
1990	Blind Vengeance	Vrsac	TV movie	
1993	Matlock	Patrol officer	TV series; (2 episodes)	
1994	The Birds II: Land's End	Bartender Jesse	TV movie	
1994	Justice in a Small Town	Robert Stubbs	TV movie	
1994	Leave of Absence	Guy	TV movie	
1995	American Gothic	Wash Sutpen	TV series	
1995	Gramps	Father	TV movie	
1995	Tad	Tom Pendel	TV movie	
1995	Tecumseh: The Last Warrior	Whitley	TV movie	
1996	The Lazarus Man	Dawkins	TV series; (2 episodes)	
1999	JAG	Admiral Arthur Fessenden	TV series	
1999	Walker, Texas Ranger	Freddie Forbes	TV series; (2 episodes)	
2003	The Last Cowboy	Otis Bertram	TV movie	
2005–2008	Prison Break	Charles Westmoreland	TV series; (19 episodes)	
2006	Close to Home	Bob Peters	TV series	
2006	Jane Doe: The Harder They Fall	Captain Barnes	TV movie	
2006–2017	NCIS	Mike Franks	TV series; (20 episodes)	
2007	Criminal Minds	Mickey Bates	TV series	
2007	Ghost Whisperer	Milt Charles	TV series	
2009	The Mentalist	Jake Cooby	TV series	
2009	Cold Case	John Norwood	TV series	
2009	iCarly	Bucky	TV series	
2010	Castle	Ivan Podofski	TV series	
2011	Franklin & Bash	Officer Tom Werth	TV series	
2013	Eagleheart	Quint	TV series	
2014	Justified	Elmont Swain	TV series	
2021	Diary of a Lunatic: Sylke's Tales	The Creator	TV miniseries; (8 episodes)	
2026	NCIS: Origins	Mike Franks	TV series (season 3, episode 6)	
