= Lowa Health Zone =

Health zone in Tshopo Province, DR Congo

Lowa Health Zone Zone de santé de Lowa
- Health zone
- Country: Democratic Republic of the Congo
- Province: Tshopo

Population (2025 (est.))
  - Total: ~152,000
- Planning denominator.
- Time zone: UTC+2 (CAT)

Lowa Health Zone (French: Zone de santé de Lowa, often abbreviated ZdS Lowa) is a health zone in Tshopo Province, in the Democratic Republic of the Congo.

Lowa Health Zone has been reported in humanitarian and public-health updates, including cholera and poliomyelitis response activities and malaria prevention campaigns.

As of 2025 campaign planning, the zone served an estimated ~152,000 residents.

== See also ==
- Health zone (Democratic Republic of the Congo)
