= Deadly Desire =

1991 television film directed by Charles Correll

- Genre: Drama
- Written by: Jerrold L. Ludwig; Tobi Ludwig
- Directed by: Charles Correll
- Starring: Jack Scalia; Kathryn Harrold; Will Patton; Joe Santos
- Music by: Nan Schwartz
- Country of origin: United States
- Original language: English

Production
- Producer: Vanessa Greene
- Production location: San Diego
- Cinematography: Paul Onorato
- Editor: Stephen Lovejoy
- Running time: 93 min
- Production companies: Paramount Television; Skylark Films; Wilshire Court Productions

Original release
- Network: USA Network
- Release: January 29, 1991

Deadly Desire is a 1991 made-for-TV thriller film directed by Charles Corell and starring Jack Scalia, Kathryn Harrold, and Will Patton.

== Synopsis ==
Frank Decker (Scalia) is an ex-Los Angeles policeman now partnered in a private security firm in San Diego. During the course of his job, he meets and falls in love with the beautiful Angela (Harrold) who's unhappily married to the rich and dangerous Giles Menteer (Patton). The complications which result from this "triangle" follow a pattern reminiscent of Double Indemnity and Body Heat.
