= Search for Grace =

1994 television film by Sam Pillsbury

- Promotional poster
- Genre: Fantasy; Thriller
- Written by: Alex Ayres
- Directed by: Sam Pillsbury
- Starring: Lisa Hartman Black; Ken Wahl
- Music by: Michael Hoenig
- Country of origin: United States
- Original language: English

Production
- Executive producer: Cynthia Whitcomb
- Producers: Vanessa Greene; Susan Jeter
- Cinematography: Eric Van Haren Noman
- Editor: Pam Malouf-Cundy
- Running time: 89 minutes
- Production company: CBS Entertainment Productions

Original release
- Network: CBS
- Release: May 17, 1994

Search for Grace is a 1994 American fantasy and thriller television film directed by Sam Pillsbury and written by Alex Ayres. It was produced by CBS Entertainment Productions and stars Lisa Hartman Black and Ken Wahl. The film tells the story of Ivy (played by Hartman Black), a landscaper who leaves her long-time boyfriend to be with the mysterious Johnny (Wahl). Ivy begins experiencing flashbacks to the life of a long-dead woman named Grace (also played by Hartman Black), whose life in 1927, including her doomed relationship with the gangster Jake (Wahl), mirrors her own.

Billed as being "inspired by an actual case history", Ayres got the idea for the story from an account of a woman who had purportedly described a past unsolved murder while under hypnosis. The film was shot in Wilmington, North Carolina, from March to April 1994. Search for Grace premiered on CBS on May 17, 1994, earning a Nielsen rating of 10.5 to become the 36th highest-rated prime time broadcast for its respective week. Reviewers generally found the plot absurd and the acting mediocre, with some criticizing the film as contrived and poorly-executed, and others giving it credit for originality and imaginative storytelling.

== Plot ==
In contemporary Wilmington, North Carolina, Ivy, a 30-year-old landscaper, receives a marriage proposal from her long-time boyfriend Dave. The proposal unsettles Ivy who has doubts if Dave is truly her soulmate. She also begins suffering from fainting spells which are accompanied by visions of a woman being strangled to death. After a chance meeting, Ivy finds herself drawn to a stranger claiming to be the notorious playboy Johnny Danielli. Ivy breaks up with Dave and begins dating Johnny.

Meanwhile, Ivy's visions trigger memories of someone named Sarah, and her physician suggests psychological help. She starts seeing a psychologist, Dr. Randolph, who suspects her visions may be repressed memories and helps her uncover them using hypnosis. Under hypnosis, Ivy claims to be Grace, a 31-year-old housewife from Buffalo, New York, who was killed in 1927. Over several hypnosis sessions, Ivy learns that Grace was stuck in an unhappy marriage with Sam, with whom she had a daughter named Sarah. Grace was also having an affair with a dangerous gangster named Jake. On the night she died, Grace had decided to leave Sam to be with Jake. Ivy suspects that she was Grace in her past life, with Jake similarly being the past incarnation of Johnny.

Johnny initially showers Ivy with romantic gestures and expensive gifts. Over time, however, he becomes increasingly controlling and violent. Ivy ends their relationship after he becomes physically violent with her during an argument. She also finds out that Johnny is a con man who has been lying about his real identity. Dave is concerned when he finds out about Johnny's abusive behavior, but Ivy insists she can handle her own problems. Meanwhile, Johnny refuses to leave Ivy alone and threatens her in her home. Ivy realizes Johnny has stolen her money and steals his expensive car in return, driving to Buffalo to investigate her past life as Grace. In the local library, Ivy finds old newspaper articles confirming Grace's existence and death, and her memories of Grace resurface. Ivy realizes that it was Jake who killed Grace after she changed her mind about running away with him, dumping her body in the Niagara Falls.

Meanwhile, Johnny has secretly followed Ivy to Buffalo and confronts her in her motel room. He forces her into his car and drives her to a secluded spot by the Niagara Falls, where he attempts to kill her, mirroring Jake's actions on the night he killed Grace. However, unbeknownst to them, Dave has also been following Johnny. With Dave's help, Ivy manages to escape from Johnny, who ends up drowning during their struggle. Reunited with Dave, Ivy visits Grace's grave to say goodbye and meets Sarah, Grace's daughter, now in her old age.

== Cast ==
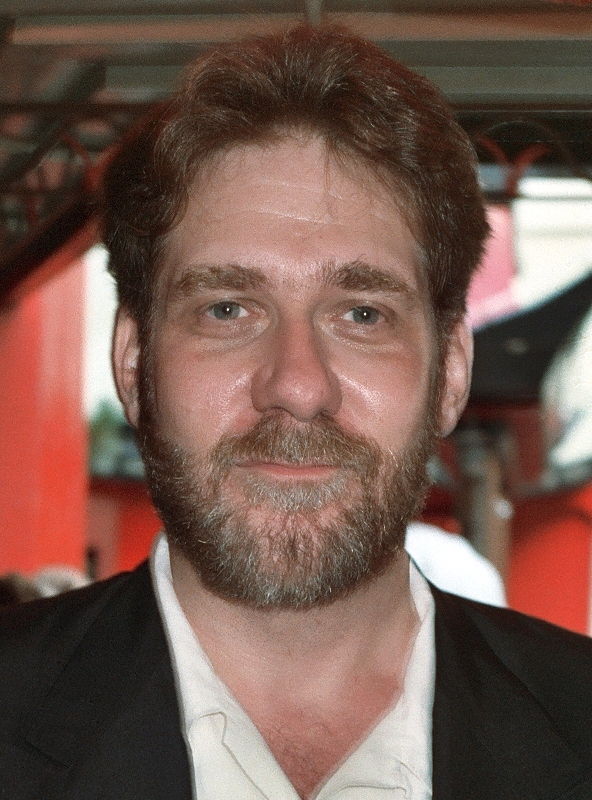
Richard Masur, pictured in 1990

- Lisa Hartman Black as Ivy/Grace
- Ken Wahl as John "Johnny" Danielli/Jake
- Richard Masur as Dr. Randolph
- Suzzanne Douglas as Margaret/Melody
- Don Michael Paul as Dave/Sam
- Lori Lindberg as Dr. Sanders
- Evan Rachel Wood as young Sarah/Robin
- Ann Donnell as mature Sarah
- Delbert C. Taylor as a piano player
- Winston Hemingway as a doorman

== Production ==
Search for Grace was directed by Sam Pillsbury and written by Alex Ayres. It was produced by CBS Entertainment Productions, with Cynthia Whitcomb serving as executive producer, and Vanessa Greene and Susan Jeter serving as producers. The creative team also included cinematographer Eric Van Haren Noman, editor Pam Malouf-Cundy, and composer Michael Hoenig.

Billed as being "inspired by an actual case history", Ayres got the idea for the story from an account of a Southern woman who had purportedly described a past murder while under hypnosis. According to Ayres, he looked into the details of said account and found that they matched those of an unsolved 1927 death of a woman named Grace Doze in Buffalo, New York. Ayres noted that while "there is a research basis for this", the film sensationalized events for dramatic purposes. Hartman Black was drawn to the project because she felt it was different from the typical "true story" television fare, noting that it features flashbacks and aspects of mysticism. She prepared for the role by observing and taking part in various hypnosis sessions herself. For Wahl, the role marked a return to acting after a two-year absence. He said he chose to make his comeback with Search for Grace because a television film would not be as demanding as a feature film or television series. Wahl described his character as "evil" and devoid of positive traits.

Search for Grace was filmed in Wilmington, North Carolina, from March to April 1994. For the scenes set in the 1920s, the production used actual clothing that had been preserved from that time period.

== Release and reception ==
Search for Grace premiered on CBS on May 17, 1994, in the 9:00–11:00 pm time slot, as part of the network's May "sweeps" line-up.

=== Ratings ===
The film earned a 10.5 national Nielsen rating, where each ratings point represents 942,000 households, and a 17-percent audience share. It was the 36th highest-rated prime time broadcast for the week of May 16 to 22, 1994.

=== Critical response ===
Variety's Tony Scott panned the film as lacking suspense and intrigue, which he attributed to the absurd plot, the unsubtle performances of the lead actors, and the director's failure to create tension. In the Courier News, John McMartin criticized the "contrived" and "unbelievable" story, and found Hartman Black's performance unmemorable. He was also dismissive of the use of reincarnation to explain Ivy's visions, and concluded that watching the film was a waste of time. Similarly, The Seattle Times' John Voorhees thought the film was dull, poorly-executed, and devoid of believable moments. Meanwhile, Hartford Courant's Jon Burlingame found the film formulaic, and New York's John Leonard did not understand why Hartman Black's character was even attracted to Wahl's in the first place.

While Mark Lorando of The Times-Picayune also found the plot absurd and the acting average, he credited the film for having a style and novelty that made it a distinct, and overall, decent "sweeps" film. The Los Angeles Times' Ray Loynd agreed that by combining the past and present to create a shroud of mystery, Search for Grace was an imaginative departure from the typical television fare.
