= Starlight Hotel =

1987 New Zealand Depression-era drama film

- Directed by: Sam Pillsbury
- Written by: Grant Hindin-Miller
- Produced by: Finola Dwyer; Larry Parr
- Starring: Greer Robson-Kirk; Peter Phelps; Bruce Phillips
- Cinematography: Warrick Attewell
- Edited by: Michael Horton
- Music by: Andrew Hagen; Morton Wilson
- Production companies: Challenge Film Corporation; New Zealand Film Commission
- Release date: 1987
- Running time: 93 minutes
- Country: New Zealand
- Language: English

Starlight Hotel is a 1987 New Zealand Depression-era drama film.

== Synopsis ==
During the Great Depression era of the 1930s in New Zealand's South Island, two outcasts, one of them a 13-year-old in search of her father, link up and become friends.

== Cast ==
- Greer Robson-Kirk as Kate
- Bruce Phillips as Kate's Father
- Alice Fraser as Aunt
- Patrick Smyth as Uncle
- The Wizard of New Zealand as Swaggie
- John Watson as School Teacher
- Robin Harris as Minister
- Vanessa Young as Schoolgirl #1
- Teresa Bonney as Schoolgirl #2
- Duncan Anderson as Railway Foreman
- Russell Gibson as Railway Worker
- Marshall Napier as Det. Wallace
- Norman Forsey as Farmer
- Craig Halkett as Farmer's Son
- Peter Phelps as Patrick
- Louise Petherbridge as Chairwoman
- Laura Robertson as Panel Member
- Robert Borthwick as Panel Member
- Geoffrey Wearing as Panel Member
- Ian Elliot as Man in Village Hall
- Lex Cochrane as Cop on Bike
- Peter McCauley as Repo Man
- William Walker as Repo Man (as Bill Walker)
- Mervyn Glue as Mr. Skip
- Shirley Kelly as Mrs. Skip
- Peter Brunt as Constable #1
- Donogh Rees as Helen
- Timothy Lee as Bailiff
- Michael Brown as Street Speaker
- Lee Matheson as Constable #2 (as Lex Matheson)
- Peter Dennett as Des
- Yvonne Martin as Desk Nurse
- Reuben Pillsbury as Boy in Hospital
- Deanna Briant as Sister
- Sue Curnow as Barbara
- Gary McCormick as Desk Cop
- Kath Te Maiharda as Salvation
- Doug Randall as Tent Town Henry
- Janice Gray as Pickup Driver
- Pat Anglem as Maori Woman
- Janet Ruben as Maori Woman
- Desmond Kelly as Train Gateman
- Patrick Paynter as Station Master
- Judy Cleine as Social Worker
- John Mellor as Sailor

== Reception ==
- Variety, reviewing the film after viewing it at the Cannes Film Festival, found "the film benefits tremendously from the charismatic performances of the leads" and called it "a very appealing pic."
- TV Guide described Starlight Hotel as "Beautifully photographed...Had [the actors'] performances been weaker, the story might easily have been lost in the gorgeous photography of the magnificent New Zealand countryside...even though they realized it would require considerable extra expense, Mirage decided the incredible natural beauty of the South Island would immeasurably enhance the film, and they shot the entire film there."
- Best Family Videos gave it an A− quality rating and recommended it for teens to adults.
