= A Mother's Instinct =

- Genre: Mystery; Drama
- Written by: Norman Morrill
- Directed by: Sam Pillsbury
- Starring: Lindsay Wagner; Debrah Farentino; John Terry
- Music by: James McVay
- Country of origin: United States
- Original language: English

Production
- Executive producer: Joel S. Rice
- Cinematography: Daryn Okada; Matthew Williams
- Editor: Sabrina Plisco
- Running time: 88 minutes
- Production companies: CBS Productions; Erica Film Productions Inc.; WildRice Productions

Original release
- Network: CBS
- Release: March 13, 1996

A Mother's Instinct is a 1996 American mystery drama television film directed by Sam Pillsbury and written by Norman Morrill. It stars Lindsay Wagner, Debrah Farentino, and John Terry, and was filmed in Wilmington, North Carolina. It aired in the United States on CBS, on March 13, 1996.

== Plot ==
A former divorcée learns that her new husband's past includes an abandoned wife. After he disappears with his two sons, the two wives team up to find him.

== Cast ==
- Lindsay Wagner as Raeanne Gilbaine
- Debrah Farentino as Holly Mitchell
- John Terry as Carl Gibbons / Gilbaine
- Lynne Thigpen as "Mike" Wheelwright (credited as Lynn Thigpen)
- Alana Austin as Amanda
- Lee Norris as Jeremy / Joey
- Andres Nichols as Ronald / Robby (credited as Andy Nichols)
- Barbara Babcock as Mrs. Mitchell
- Laura Robbins as Sheila
- Alex Van as Bobby Mitchell
- Mert Hatfield as Gerard Fudge
- Pete Burris as Cop
- Chris Daughtry as Richard Mitchell
- Bob Hannah as Headmaster
- Richard K. Olsen as Justice of the Peace
- George Nannarello as Hal Bingham
