= Into the Badlands (film) =

1991 American made-for-television film

- Promotional poster
- Based on: "The Streets of Laredo" by Will Henry; "The Time of the Wolves" by Marcia Muller; "The Last Pelt" by Bryce Walton
- Written by: Dick Beebe; Marjorie David; Gordon Dawson
- Directed by: Sam Pillsbury
- Starring: Bruce Dern; Mariel Hemingway; Helen Hunt
- Music by: John Debney
- Country of origin: United States
- Original language: English

Production
- Executive producers: Michael Ogiens; Josh Kane
- Producer: Harvey Frand
- Cinematography: Johnny E. Jensen
- Editors: Stanford C. Allen; John A. Barton
- Running time: 89 minutes
- Production company: Ogiens/Kane Company

Original release
- Network: USA Network
- Release: July 24, 1991

Into the Badlands is a 1991 American Western horror television film directed by Sam Pillsbury, and written by Dick Beebe, Marjorie David and Gordon Dawson. It stars Bruce Dern, Mariel Hemingway and Helen Hunt. The film was nominated for a 1992 Primetime Emmy in Cinematography for a Miniseries or a Special (Johnny E. Jensen).

== Plot ==
Three seemingly disconnected stories are joined together by a mystery Man in Black (T.L. Barston, played by Bruce Dern). This bounty hunter searches the Old West for Red Roundtree, a wanted outlaw.

== Cast ==
- Bruce Dern as T. L. Barston
- Mariel Hemingway as Alma Heusser
- Helen Hunt as Blossom
- Dylan McDermott as McComas
- Lisa Pelikan as Sarah Carstairs
- Andrew Robinson as Sheriff Aaron Starett
- Michael J. Metzger as Red Roundtree
