= Wait till Your Mother Gets Home! =

1983 American made-for-television film

- VHS cover
- Genre: Comedy
- Written by: David Eyre; Bill Persky
- Directed by: Bill Persky
- Starring: Paul Michael Glaser; Dee Wallace; Tamar Howard; Robert Jayne; Joseph Lawrence
- Music by: Ken Harrison
- Country of origin: United States
- Original language: English

Production
- Executive producers: Blue André; Vanessa Greene; Alice Gwyn Pardo
- Producer: Albert J. Salzer
- Cinematography: Frank Stanley
- Editor: Gerald Shepard
- Running time: 97 min. (approx.)
- Production companies: NBC; Blue Greene Productions

Original release
- Network: NBC
- Release: January 17, 1983

Wait till Your Mother Gets Home! is a 1983 American made-for-television comedy film starring Paul Michael Glaser and Dee Wallace.

== Plot ==
Bob Peters (Paul Michael Glaser) works as a High School football coach while his wife Pat (Dee Wallace) is a stay-at-home mom. Now without any gain of support, Pat becomes restless after Bob wins the "Man of the Year Award".

After receiving his award, the school principal (David Doyle) asks if Pat would be interested in becoming the school's secretary for the summer, but Bob says no, believing that her place is in the home. After learning that Bob's summer driving instructor job has been cancelled, Pat rebels against Bob and takes the job. Bob bets Pat that being a full-time caregiver will be easy for him, but quickly realizes that it is more difficult than he thought. Meanwhile, Pat loves her job and getting to talk to other adults.

Bob has enough of housekeeping and storms out of the house after getting into a fight with Pat. After several calls trying to contact him, Pat turns on the TV and sees Bob apologizing about how hard it is to be a homemaker. Bob then gets the entire high school marching band to come down their street to honor Pat and all of the hard work she does.

== Cast and crew ==
- Paul Michael Glaser as Bob Peters
- Dee Wallace as Pat Peters
- Peggy McCay as Cynthia Peters
- James Gregory as Dan Peters
- Tamar Howard as Jenny Peters
- Bobby Jacoby as Robert Peters
- Joey Lawrence as Chris Peters
- David Doyle as Herman Ohme
- Ray Buktenica as Fred
- Lynne Moody as Marion
- Rita Taggart as Mrs. Walt Johnson
