= Anthony Tyler Quinn =

American actor

- Occupation: Actor
- Years active: 1982–present
- Spouse: Margaret Quinn (m. 1985)
- Children: 2

Anthony Tyler Quinn is an American actor best known for playing Jonathan Turner on Boy Meets World from 1994 to 1997, a role he later reprised on Girl Meets World.

== Career ==
In 1998, Quinn starred as columnist Jack Cody in the Fox sitcom Ask Harriet. In 2017, he portrayed Wendell Corey in Feud: Bette and Joan.

== Personal life ==
Quinn married his high school sweetheart Margaret on June 15, 1985. They have two children, a daughter named Andie Tyler and a son named Roman Gabriel. Quinn is a Christian.

== Partial filmography ==
Additional information needed

- Angel (1982) - Maloney
- Airwolf (1984, TV Series) - Everett
- Peyton Place: The Next Generation (1985, TV Movie) - Joey Harrington
- Problem Child (1990) - (voice)
- Working Girl (1990, TV Series) - Sal Pascarella
- The Chase (1991, TV Movie) - Dale
- Someone Like Me (1994, TV Series) - Steven Stepjak
- Boy Meets World (1994–1997, TV Series) - Jonathan Turner
- Melrose Place (1998, TV Series) - Rory Blake / Lt. Tim Truman
- Abandoned and Deceived (1995, TV Movie) - Gary
- Killer: A Journal of Murder (1995) - (voice)
- JAG (1998, TV Series) - Sergente Giovanni Cade
- Ask Harriet (1998, TV Series) - Jack Cody / Sylvia Coco
- 3rd Rock From the Sun (1999, TV Series) - Sam "the butcher" Marchetti
- Caroline in the City (1999, TV Series) - Randy / Randy Thorsen
- Just Shoot Me! (2000, TV Series) - Brad
- Diagnosis Murder (2001, TV Series) - Calvin Laird
- Smuggler's Ransom (2006) - Bill Donley
- Ghost Whisperer (2008, TV Series) - Mr. Linarcos
- Cold Case (2008, TV Series) - Hugh Masterson
- The Mentalist (2009, TV Series) - Lawyer
- No Greater Love (2010) - Jeff Baker
- House M.D. (2010, TV Series) - Eli Morgan
- A Christmas Snow (2010) - Andrew
- The New Republic (2011) - Hendrix
- Pretty Little Liars (2012, TV Series) - Ron
- Days of Our Lives (2013, TV Series) - Joe Bernardi
- NCIS (2014, TV Series) - Navy Commander Clarence Daniels
- Greyscale (2015) - Jonathon Cole
- Zer0-Tolerance (2017) - Anthony Boyd
- Girl Meets World (2015-2017, TV Series) - Jonathan Turner
- Feud: Bette and Joan (2017, TV Series) - Wendell Corey
