= Morgan's Ferry =

2001 film by Sam Pillsbury

- VHS cover
- Directed by: Sam Pillsbury
- Written by: Kathy McCormick
- Produced by: Daniel Levin
- Starring: Billy Zane; Kelly McGillis; Johnny Galecki; Henry Rollins; Roscoe Lee Browne
- Cinematography: Johnny E. Jensen
- Edited by: Margaret Goodspeed
- Music by: Mader
- Production companies: James-Furman Productions; Oregon Trail Films; Platform Entertainment; Zane Productions Inc.
- Distributed by: Artist View Entertainment
- Release date: 2001
- Running time: 91 minutes
- Country: United States
- Language: English

Morgan's Ferry is a 2001 American crime drama film directed by Sam Pillsbury, written by Kathy McCormick, and starring Billy Zane, Kelly McGillis, Johnny Galecki, Henry Rollins and Roscoe Lee Browne.

== Plot ==
A trio of escaped criminals hide out in a woman's home as they wait to catch a ferry.

== Cast ==
- Billy Zane as Sam
- Kelly McGillis as Vonnie Carpenter
- Johnny Galecki as Darcy
- Henry Rollins as Monroe
- Roscoe Lee Browne as Peabo
- Muse Watson as Sheriff
