= New Llano, Louisiana =

- Town
- Location of New Llano in Vernon Parish, Louisiana.

- Location of Louisiana in the United States
- Coordinates: 31°06′47″N 93°17′06″W
- Country: United States
- State: Louisiana
- Parish: Vernon

Area
  - Total: 2.71 sq mi (7.01 km^{2})
  - Land: 2.67 sq mi (6.92 km^{2})
  - Water: 0.035 sq mi (0.09 km^{2})
- Elevation: 246 ft (75 m)

Population (2020)
  - Total: 2,213
  - Density: 827.7/sq mi (319.59/km^{2})
- Time zone: UTC-6 (CST)
  - Summer (DST): UTC-5 (CDT)
- ZIP code: 71461
- Area code: 337
- FIPS code: 22-54175
- GNIS feature ID: 2406977
- Website: www.townofnewllano.com

New Llano is a town in Vernon Parish, Louisiana, United States. As of the 2020 census, New Llano had a population of 2,213. It is a part of the Fort Johnson South Micropolitan Statistical Area.

Originally known as Stables, the town was renamed when 200 members of the whites-only socialist commune Llano del Rio Cooperative Colony in California relocated to this site in 1917, giving the town its present name.

== History ==
The New Llano Cooperative Colony was founded in 1917 when Job Harriman relocated, with other commune members of the Llano del Rio colony, to 20,000 acres of cut-over land two miles south of Leesville after difficulties securing water at the California site and power struggles at the commune. The location chosen was the Gulf Lumber Company sawmill town named Stables. The mill had burned in 1913 and again in 1916. After the sawmill burnt for the second time, it was not rebuilt because the stumpage reserves were depleted. The land, was sold on contract to the Cooperative Colony.

The colony attempted to achieve self-sufficiency through community ownership of a newspaper, broom factory, sawmill, ice plant, and sheet metal factory. There was also a school, infirmary, hospital, and recreational facilities. The colony closed in 1937.

New Llano has developed a reputation as a "speed trap." Local media has covered allegations of predatory ticket-writing.

== Geography ==
According to the United States Census Bureau, the town has a total area of 1.0 square mile (2.5 km^{2}), all land.

== Demographics ==
Historical population
Census	Pop.	Note	%±
1950	277		—
1960	264		−4.7%
1970	1,800		581.8%
1980	2,213		22.9%
1990	2,660		20.2%
2000	2,415		−9.2%
2010	2,504		3.7%
2020	2,213		−11.6%
2025 (est.)	2,015	▼	−8.9%
U.S. Decennial Census

=== 2020 census ===
As of the 2020 census, New Llano had a population of 2,213, with 914 households and 591 families residing in the town. The median age was 35.9 years. 24.0% of residents were under the age of 18 and 14.5% were 65 years of age or older. For every 100 females there were 92.4 males, and for every 100 females age 18 and over there were 88.4 males age 18 and over.

97.6% of residents lived in urban areas, while 2.4% lived in rural areas.

Of the town's households, 32.4% had children under the age of 18 living in them. 35.0% were married-couple households, 21.0% were households with a male householder and no spouse or partner present, and 36.1% were households with a female householder and no spouse or partner present. About 31.7% of all households were made up of individuals, and 10.0% had someone living alone who was 65 years of age or older.

There were 1,055 housing units, of which 13.4% were vacant. The homeowner vacancy rate was 1.1% and the rental vacancy rate was 11.4%.

New Llano racial composition
Race	Number	Percentage
White (non-Hispanic)	837	37.82%
Black or African American (non-Hispanic)	843	38.09%
Native American	26	1.17%
Asian	114	5.15%
Pacific Islander	11	0.5%
Other/Mixed	160	7.23%
Hispanic or Latino	222	10.03%

=== 2000 census ===
As of the census of 2000, there were 2,415 people, 925 households, and 640 families residing in the town. The population density was 2,488.0 inhabitants per square mile (960.6/km^{2}). There were 1,037 housing units at an average density of 1,068.3 per square mile (412.5/km^{2}). The racial makeup of the town was 46.09% White, 40.29% African American, 0.83% Native American, 3.77% Asian, 0.29% Pacific Islander, 4.10% from other races, and 4.64% from two or more races. Hispanic or Latino of any race were 8.57% of the population.

There were 925 households, out of which 40.8% had children under the age of 18 living with them, 46.4% were married couples living together, 18.3% had a female householder with no husband present, and 30.8% were non-families. 24.4% of all households were made up of individuals, and 5.1% had someone living alone who was 65 years of age or older. The average household size was 2.61 and the average family size was 3.11.

In the town, the population was spread out, with 30.8% under the age of 18, 10.6% from 18 to 24, 33.5% from 25 to 44, 19.7% from 45 to 64, and 5.3% who were 65 years of age or older. The median age was 29 years. For every 100 females, there were 100.9 males. For every 100 females age 18 and over, there were 95.8 males.

The median income for a household in the town was $35,417, and the median income for a family was $34,271. Males had a median income of $26,563 versus $20,500 for females. The per capita income for the town was $15,902. About 13.5% of families and 15.6% of the population were below the poverty line, including 18.4% of those under age 18 and 13.9% of those age 65 or over.
