= Llano del Rio =

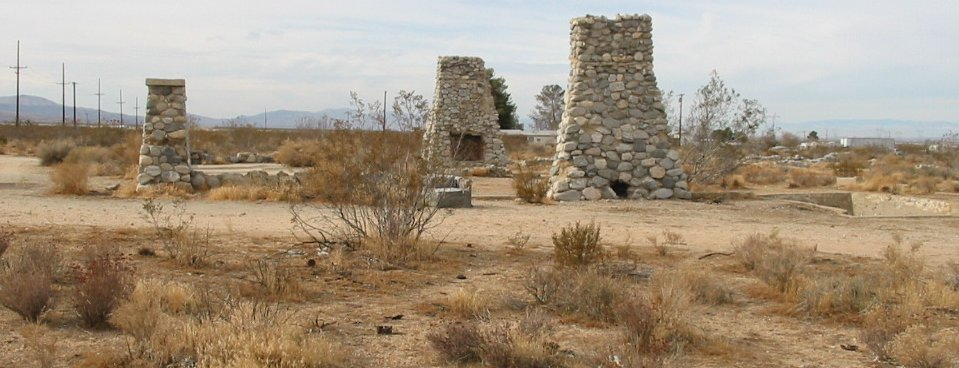
- Llano del Rio ruins in late 2009

- Location in Los Angeles County
- 34°30′23.3″N 117°49′37.5″W
- Location: Llano, California

California Historical Landmark
- Official name: Llano del Rio Cooperative Company
- Reference no.: 933

Llano del Rio was a commune (or "colony") located in what is now Llano, California, east of Palmdale in the Antelope Valley, Los Angeles County. The colony was devised by lawyer and socialist politician Job Harriman after he had failed in his bid to become the mayor of Los Angeles in 1911. The colony's land was acquired in 1913 and it was formally launched on May 1, 1914.

The Llano del Rio Colony settled in the southern edge of the Mojave Desert along what is now Highway 138 near what is now 165th Street East, in the alluvial plain spreading to the north from the San Gabriel Mountains. The colony took advantage of water from Big Rock Creek, an intermittent stream that flows from the San Gabriel Mountains. Several structures were constructed using local granite boulders and lumber, including a hotel, meeting house, and water storage tank. There was also a small open aqueduct made of granite cobbles and cement. As of 2024, remnants of the structures are still visible at the site.

The site was abandoned in 1918. Llano del Rio turned out to be too far from other settlements to develop a sustaining economy, and the water supply from Big Rock Creek proved to be unreliable. Some of the settlers, approximately 60 families in all, relocated to form New Llano, Louisiana.

== History ==
=== Background ===
Full page ad for the new Llano del Rio colony published in July 1914 in The Western Comrade, a monthly magazine started by Job Harriman to help promote the venture

Job Harriman, a lawyer by training and a politician by proclivity, was the founder of the socialist cooperative colony known as Llano del Rio. Harriman, a former candidate for governor of the state of California on the ticket of the Socialist Labor Party and 1900 vice-presidential candidate of the Social Democratic Party on a ticket headed by Eugene V. Debs, was long an advocate of political action for the achievement of socialism in America.

Only after his defeat in the 1911 election as the Socialist Party's candidate for mayor of Los Angeles, California, did Harriman's thinking turn from politics to an interest in directly demonstrating what he believed to be the inherent superiority of cooperative and collective economic activity as a means for building public support for the socialist idea. Like others before him, Harriman theorized that by creating a functioning socialist community within the larger society of capitalism, the larger society would gradually convert to socialism.

"It became apparent to me that a people would never abandon their means of livelihood, good or bad, capitalistic or otherwise, until other methods were developed which would promise advantages at least as good as those by which they were living," Harriman later recalled.

Several prominent Southern California friends were solicited for financial and practical support and a 9,000-acre (3,600 ha) site was located about 45 miles (72 km) north of Los Angeles in the Antelope Valley. A purchase option was taken on the land, which had earlier been partially developed by a colony of temperance advocates. Assets of the Mescal Water and Land Company, including water rights and bonds sold for $150,000 to finance the earlier colonization effort, were purchased by Harriman and his associates for a small fraction of their original value.

A new nine-member board of directors was appointed and sale of stock was begun in the fall of 1913 with a view to financing a new socialist community on the existing colony's site. A restructuring followed in 1914 and the Mescal Water and Land was incorporated as the Llano Del Rio Company.

=== Establishment ===
Colonists outside a crude machine shop at the Llano del Rio colony, 1914.

To become a member of the colony, one was required purchase exactly 2,000 stock shares and to reside at Llano at the par value of $1 per share. Colonists were allowed to buy a maximum of three fourths of their stock shares on credit. Applicants for membership were required to be idealistic, industrious, and sober. To ensure standards were met, applicants needed three references, written ideally by a local union president or secretary. Questions testing an applicant’s dedication to socialism were also part of the entrance procedure.

Additionally, only Caucasians were admitted. An article in The Western Comrade attempted to explain this admittance discrimination, “The rejection of these applications are [sic] not due to race prejudice but because it is not deemed expedient to mix the races in these communities."

In addition to the appeal of building a new socialist society, colonists were drawn to Llano by promises of good wages paid to colony members. Initially members were to be paid a salary of $4 a day, less deductions for living expenses and $1 a day towards the purchase of colony stock purchased on credit. Conditions of employment and compensation were specified in a signed labor contract. Two week vacations were promised and colonists were permitted to hold their own personal property, including automobiles. In practice this wage was illusory, however, as surplus wages were held in trust by the colony and were only to be paid out in cash if the colony ran a financial surplus — which never occurred. This pretense was ultimately abandoned for an arrangement which guaranteed all colonists’ needs would be met in exchange for their labor.

The activities at Llano del Rio were publicized to a national audience through the pages of The Western Comrade, a magazine purchased by Job Harriman in 1914. The magazine was effusive in its praise of the colony and painted the situation faced by the colonists in rosy colors. The valley in which the colony was located was bordered by the San Bernardino Mountains to the east and contained sites for fruit orchards, alfalfa fields, and vegetable production. Two creeks provided water for the land. The colony's sales techniques gave buyers unrealistic expectations about the luxury of living at Llano, which ultimately created discontent in the community when these expectations were not met.

=== Development ===
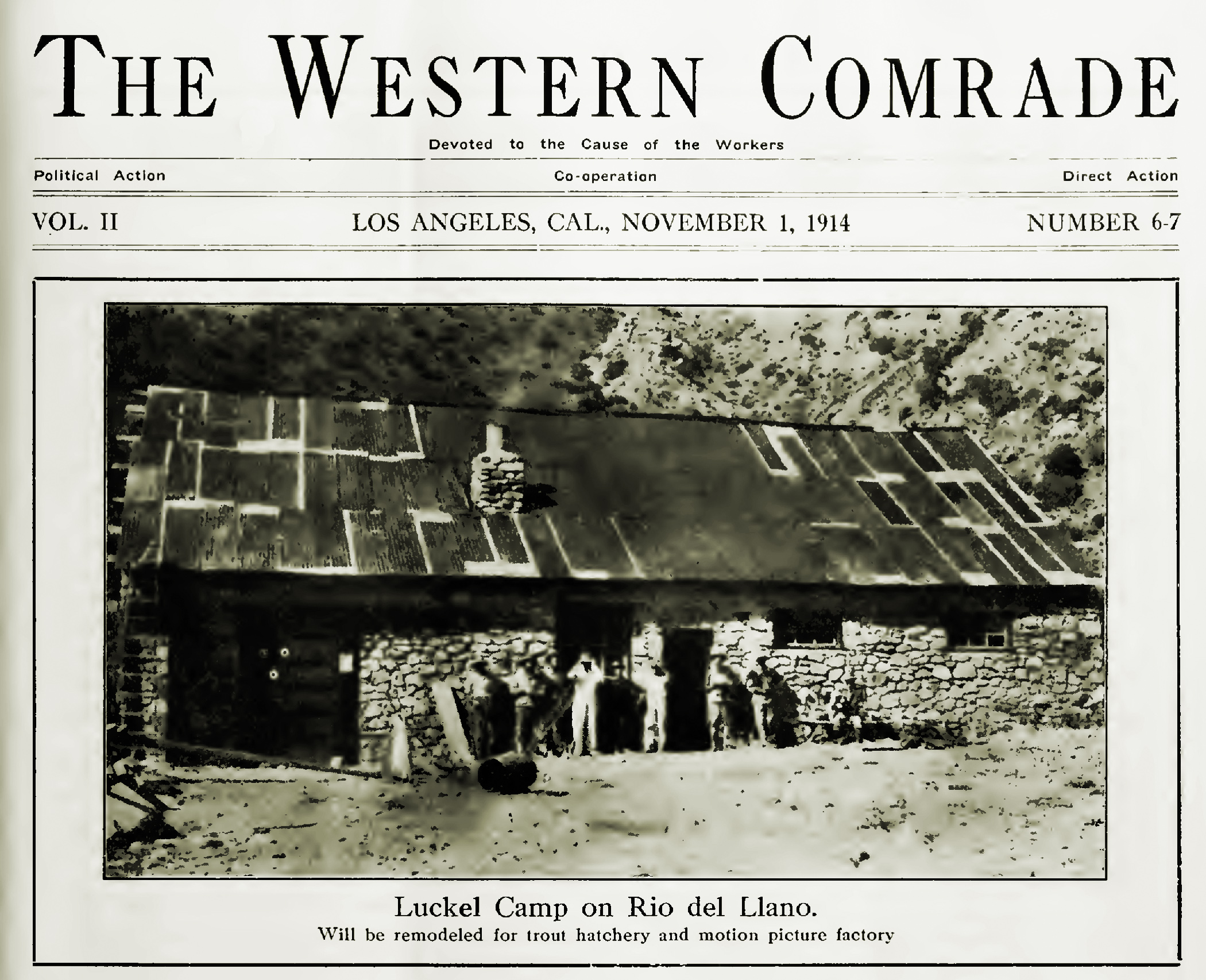
The Western Comrade conveyed grandiose plans for the Llano del Rio colony to its readers. This raw rock-walled building with a corrugated metal roof was to be "remodeled for trout hatchery and motion picture factory," according to the photo caption.

Llano opened to public membership on May Day of 1914. Only five people were residents at the time of the colony's formation, joined by a team of horses, a cow, and five pigs. By the beginning of 1915 the colony had grown to over 150 residents, possessing more than 100 cows and 110 pigs. A community center for the hosting of dances and assemblies was constructed. Unmarried men lived in an attached dormitory, while married couples lived in canvas tents during the colony's initial phase. In fairly short order a post office, dairy building, and laundry facility were built on the colony's site.

The colony was planned for development by Alice Constance Austin and stands as her most recognized project. She designed a circular city plan that included administrative buildings, restaurants, churches, schools, and markets. The houses were to be of "feminist" design and included plans for a kitchenless house, communal daycare areas, built-in furniture, and heated tile floors, all of which would serve in reducing the amount of domestic work done by women. An even more elaborate plan was unveiled in 1917, which called for row houses, a central park, and a playground. This dream world stood in marked contrast to the reality of tents and two room shacks faced by the colonists.

Colonists tended to hail from the Western United States and included substantial contingents of farmers and businessmen, with few wage workers. The colony was marked by personal disagreements and petty political controversies from its earliest days, resulting in a steady turnover of members.

Membership in the colony peaked in the summer of 1917, when over 1100 people shared the colony's grounds. By this time temporary adobe homes had sprung up, as did more permanent facilities such as a large collective dining room, a hotel, and various industrial buildings, including one of the largest rabbit facilities in the United States as well as the printing shop for production of The Western Comrade. Orchards were planted and about 2,000 acres (810 ha) of irrigated alfalfa harvested.

== Life at Llano ==
=== Economy ===
Although Llano did not export goods to outside markets, its local economy was almost completely sustaining. The economy included a paint shop, agriculture, orchards, a poultry yard, a rabbitry, a print shop, and a fish hatchery. Despite the arid environment and sandy soil, Llano’s farms flourished. Using the water purchased by the Llano Del Rio Company, Llano’s farmers transformed the dry soil into fertile farmland. Southern California’s warm climate proved to be ideal for agricultural production. Alfalfa, corn, and grain were Llano’s staple crops. By 1916, Llano grew ninety percent of the food eaten at the colony. However, agricultural exports were prevented by Llano’s distance from a train depot. Though Llano’s export economy never developed much, some goods, such as rag rugs and underwear, were sold at external markets.

=== Education ===
Llano had a school system, which followed both the Montessori and the Industrial principles of teaching. Montessori and Industrial schools encourage practical and active learning, teaching methods consistent with socialist values. In the Industrial School or Kids’ Colony children raised livestock, built the school’s facilities, made their own laws, and held their own disciplinary hearings. Consistent with Llano’s philosophy of gender division of labor, girls were registered into the “domestic science department.”

=== Culture and free time ===
May Day, a holiday that celebrates laborers, was a community celebration at Llano, including a parade and a community picnic. Dances were held every Thursday and Saturday night. One colonist praised these dances saying, “‘If Llano never offers or gives me more than the pleasure of attending these dances I shall feel repaid for all the effort I have made to become a member of this Colony." Additionally, there was a champion baseball team and other club sports. There was even a drama society. For entertainment, Llano staged black-face minstrel shows, swear words were prohibited when in the presence of women or children, and liquor was not allowed unless permission by a doctor was given. Violation of this ordinance was punishable by unemployment or expulsion from Llano.

== Llano’s downfall ==
=== Dissent ===
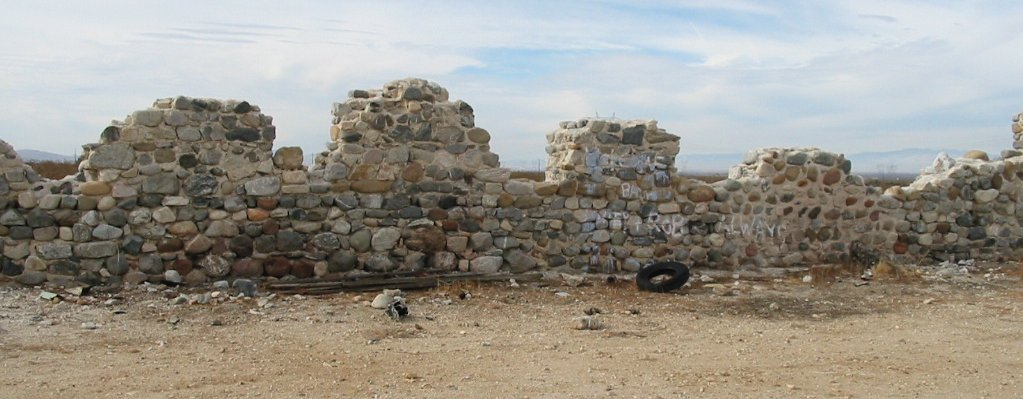
The ruins of Llano del Rio, December 2009

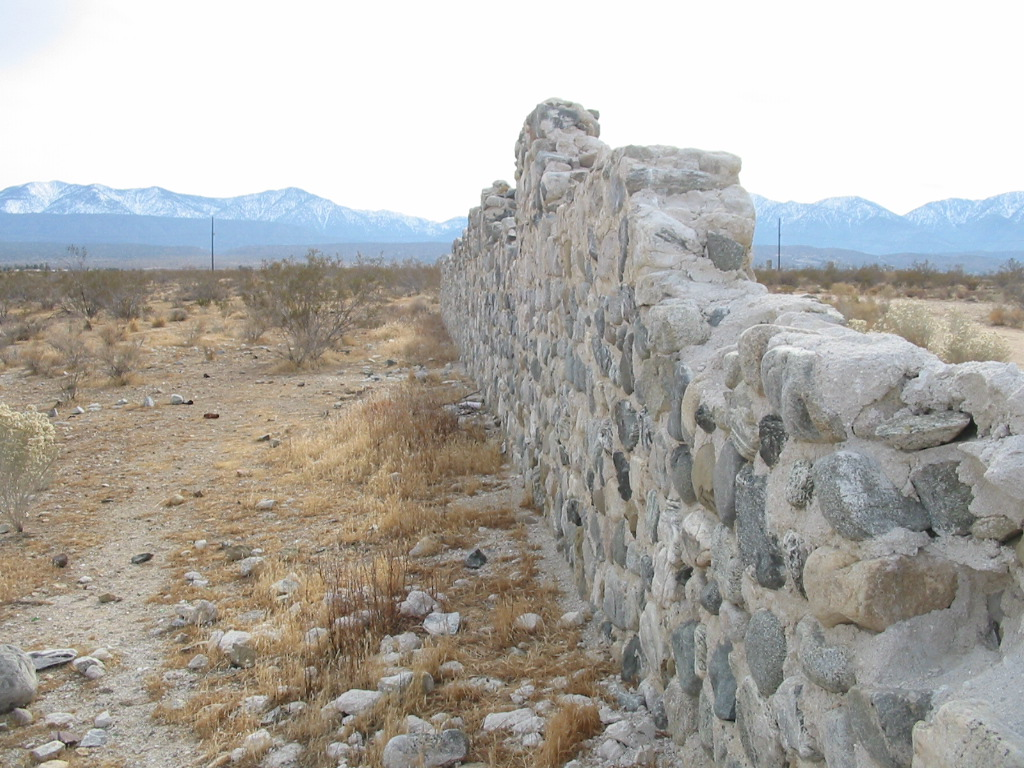
The ruins of Llano del Rio, December 2009

The political stability of Llano was threatened by internal power struggles between the Board of Directors, which was composed of seven (and eventually nine) members and the General Assembly, which was composed of all of the Llano Company’s stockholders, the members of the colony. Though the Board was efficient, it caused political dissent. Llano’s “Declaration of Principles” proclaimed “equal ownership, equal wage, and equal social opportunities.” However, Llano was not run in a democratic manner. The Board dictated all rules and regulations.

Eventually groups developed, such as the “Brush Gang”, opposing the authoritarian rule of the Board. Some members also believed that Harriman lacked strong socialist principles. One of the founders of the “Brush Gang”, Frank Miller, believed Harriman to be “Czar-like” and against the democratic election of Llano’s leadership. Additionally, many “Brush Gang” members believed that not only the political but also the economic layout of Llano was counter to socialist ideals.

However, rule by the General Assembly was also problematic. Its decisions were influenced by personal disputes, which created an ineffective political environment. Resolutions were disputed for hours, made, and then rebuked at the next meeting. In response to dissenters, one of Harriman’s supporter’s, RK Williams, wrote, “Newcomers arrived here filled with idealism and notions of a weird form of democracy that are utterly out of place in an institution dealing with... practicalities. It must be insisted that if this colony is to exist we must allow the well tried and wrought out formulas of corporations organized under capitalism... We are not attempting a Utopian phantasmagoria.’

Supporters felt that unseating the Board would result in anarchy and chaos and that central control was essential to the formation of a flourishing socialist colony.

=== World War I ===
Although Llano supported the Socialist Party’s pacifism, the threat of the draft was real. Llano attempted to ensure that all members were conscientious objectors, still the colony lost young men to the draft. WWI also posed an economic threat, because the wartime industry created jobs with higher wages and many less committed members of Llano left to work in the newly booming economy.

=== Water ===
During the early period of Llano, Harriman had secured large amounts of water for the growing colony. Though in theory Llano had enough water to sustain itself and to grow, much of the water could only be accessed by building a dam. Llano applied to California for a permit to build a dam. However, California Commissioner of Corporations denied Llano’s application to construct a dam saying, “‘Your people do not seem to have the necessary amount of experience and maybe the sums of money it will involve.’” Though planners were aware of Llano’s water shortage, they continued to deny the crisis to potential buyers until May 1917.

=== The move ===
In November 1917 The Western Comrade magazine announced that the majority of the colony was going to move to an alternative site in New Llano, Louisiana. Despite the impending relocation of Llano, Harriman asserted that Llano had “progressed from a ‘Utopian, chimerical idea’ to a concrete practicality – from a dozen dreamers to a thousand determined doers.” New Llano never attained the same size or level of productivity as the original colony. This failure was most likely due to cultural clashes with the greater culture of Louisiana and the Great Depression. The remaining Llano community in California ended due to faulty legal maneuvers. In 1918, Llano filed for bankruptcy.

=== Legacy ===
From 1967 - 2022, Llano was given tribute at Twin Oaks, a contemporary intentional community of 100 members in Virginia. All Twin Oaks' buildings are named after communities that are no longer actively functioning, and "Llano" was the name of one of the communal kitchens. In 2022, Twin Oaks changed the name because of Llano’s racist practice of admitting only white members.

The site is now registered as California Historical Landmark #933.

In Llano del Rio lived socialist architect Gregory Ain, son of Russian immigrants, in his childhood.

The song "Llano Del Rio" from the Frank Black and the Catholics 2001 album Dog in the Sand is written about a visit to this area in the present day.

== Today ==
The land where Llano del Rio sits is owned by the Los Angeles County Department of Parks and Recreation and several private landowners. The county land is a California Historical Landmark, but that does not include ruins that are still visible today. There are no future plans for the land.

== California Historical Landmark Marker ==
California Historical Landmark Marker NO. 933 at the site reads:

- NO. 933 SITE OF LLANO DEL RIO COOPERATIVE COLONY - This was the site of the most important non-religious Utopian experiment in western American history. Its founder, Job Harriman, was Eugene Debs' running mate in the presidential election of 1900. In subsequent years, Harriman became an influential socialist leader and in 1911 was almost elected mayor of Los Angeles. At its height in 1916, the colony contained a thousand members and was a flourishing communitarian experiment dedicated to the principal of cooperation rather than competition.'
- The plaque was later stolen and there are no plans to replace it.

== See also ==
- List of ghost towns in California
- Nevada City, Nevada

== Colony publications ==
- Job Harriman (ed.), The Western Comrade. Los Angeles, CA and Leesville, LA: 1913-1918.
  - Vols. 1-2 | Vols. 3-4 | Vol. 5 Owned by Harriman from June 1914 (v. 2, no. 2).
