= Geny Dignac =

American sculptor

Geny Dignac (Buenos Aires, 1932) is an American sculptor and environmental artist of Argentine birth.

== Biography ==
Born in Buenos Aires, Dignac moved to the Washington, D.C. area in 1954; she left in 1974 and settled in Arizona. Her art, much of which is created using fire and light as media, has been exhibited widely. She has lectured on the use of fire as an artistic medium, and worked with a metallurgist and the Naval Ordnance Laboratory to create works involving fire and nitinol alloys. Dignac lives in Phoenix, Arizona. She was married to José Bermudez; their son-in-law is the director Sam Pillsbury.

== Exhibitions ==
In 1968, one of her pieces was exhibited in the first show of E.A.T. which was held at the Museum of Modern Art and at the Brooklyn Museum in New York. Two of her fire sculptures were included in the "Earth, Air, Fire, and Water. Elements of Art" at the Museum of Fine Arts in Boston Massachusetts. Her solo exhibitions contain her works with fire and she has had various solo exhibitions. Her solo exhibitions include various types of her art ranging from drawing to sculptures and monuments. Her work is popular in the United States and abroad. She has been a part of group exhibitions in Medellin, Colombia, Antwerp, Belgium, New York City, Paris, France, Pamplona, Spain, Caracas, Venezuela, and San Juan, Puerto Rico. Since 1969, Geny Dignac has been expressing her use of fire in Art all over the United States and South America. She diffuses the concept of using the element of fire in her art by sharing her thoughts at many different schools and museums. She collaborated with a metallurgist and the Naval Ordnance Laboratory to create sculpture employing fire and nitinol alloys in 1971. R. Osuna and J.Y. Bermudez made her the subject of several films and videos during 1967 to 1980. Dignac wrote "Lightning is the gesture of the storm. Flames are the gesture of the fire. Fire is a magical element. Magical thinking is art" Her work can be found in private, public and corporate permanent collections. Most of the exhibitions her work is held at are Fundacio Joan Miró (Barcelona, Spain), Palazzo Dei Diamanti (Ferrara, Italy), La Tertulia Museum (Cali, Colombia), Museo del Banco Central del Ecuador (Guayaquil, Ecuador), and The Latinoamericano Art Foundation in San Juan, Puerto Rico. Her private collections are in USA, Italy, Germany, Spain, Argentina, Chile, Ecuador and Venezuela.

== Art works ==
Her art may be seen in numerous public, private, and corporate collections including that of the Fundació Joan Miró. Her projects include: "Sand Fire", "Fire Over Water" and "Forms of Fire in Mid-Air". She believes that her art should go beyond modern day art. Her most popular artworks include “3 Fire Gestures” 1970 held in Sand Hills, California, “234 Gloves” at the Arcosanti Festival. Cordes Junction, Arizona, USA, Sarasota, Florida, USA and Boston, Mass, USA, “South Arrow & La Casualidad” in Buenos Aires, Argentina, “Snow & Fire” in Oakton, Virginia, USA, “Drawing with Fire in Space” in Oakton, Virginia, USA, “Caroni and Orinoco Rivers” in Venezuela, “Sunrise” Apache Reservation in Arizona, USA, “Rio Salado” in Tempe, Arizona, USA, and "Conflagration-Iraq" in Phoenix, Arizona, USA.
