= Fifteen and Pregnant =

1998 American TV movie

- 2005 DVD cover
- Written by: Susan Cuscuna
- Directed by: Sam Pillsbury
- Starring: Kirsten Dunst; Park Overall; David Andrews; Margot Demeter
- Music by: Stephen Edwards
- Country of origin: United States
- Original language: English

Production
- Executive producer: Diana Kerew
- Cinematography: James Bartle
- Editor: Michael S. Murphy
- Running time: 96 minutes
- Production companies: Diana Kerew Productions; Hearst Entertainment

Original release
- Network: Lifetime
- Release: January 19, 1998

Fifteen and Pregnant is a 1998 American drama television film on Lifetime, starring Kirsten Dunst as a teenager who becomes pregnant. Directed by Sam Pillsbury and written by Susan Cuscuna, the film was based on a true story.

== Plot ==
14-year-old Tina Spangler has sex with her new boyfriend, Ray Wood. Ray later ends his relationship with Tina, telling her that he must focus upon his athletic goals. When Tina discovers that she has started her period, she is extremely relieved. On Tina's 15th birthday, she is despondent because another birthday has passed and she does not have a boyfriend.

Tensions arise between Tina and her mother when they are in the car together and listen to a radio program where the commentator makes remarks about the high number of teenagers getting pregnant. Tina's mother asks her daughter if she knows anyone who is sexually active, or if she has ever been sexually active. Tina is evasive and gives a non-committal response. She and her friend Laurie, a young mother who became pregnant at 17, attend a sexual health clinic where it is confirmed that Tina is pregnant.

It all comes to a head when Laurie tells Tina to tell her mother Evie about the pregnancy. Evie, a conservative Christian, is shocked but due to her beliefs, decides to help her daughter. Her dad Cal is less upset and comforts his daughter. When Tina tells Ray, he feigns happiness and acts like he wants to be with her. Tina begins pregnancy classes with Evie. After hearing a story from a girl about how hard teenage motherhood is and how her boyfriend cheated on her, Tina calls Ray and yells at him because she thinks he won't be a good father as he promised he would be. She tries to make him stay with her, but when Ray isn't as present as she'd hoped, Tina is suspicious. At the mall she finds Ray kissing another girl, cheating on her. She is upset and tells him she is over him and ends their relationship.

Throughout the stressful pregnancy, Tina's younger brother Adam tries to be supportive while younger sister Rachel reacts with both disgust and jealousy to the attention Tina receives from her concerned parents. Even when Rachel breaks her ankle, Tina receives more attention. In one instance, Rachel loses her place on the couch because Tina wants it; Rachel is told to go upstairs on her crutches if she wants to lie down. Exasperated, Rachel calls their grandmother to ask permission to live with her. As the pregnancy becomes overwhelming, Tina is rushed to the hospital and is about to give birth when Evie has a panic attack on how her daughter is going to have a baby. While Tina is in labor, Ray shows up at the hospital with his new girlfriend only to be turned away by Cal, telling him "sperm doesn't entitle you to much" and making him go to the waiting room. After a grueling labor, Tina gives birth to a baby boy whom she names Caleb. She, along with Cal, Evie, and Adam meets her grandmother and Rachel outside the hospital where they all have a small family reunion.

== Cast ==
- Park Overall as Evie Spangler, Caleb's maternal grandmother
- Kirsten Dunst as Tina Spangler, Caleb's mother
- David Andrews as Cal Spangler, Caleb's maternal grandfather
- Julia Whelan as Rachel Spangler, Caleb's maternal aunt
- Margot Demeter as Laurie Walsh
- Karen Trumbo as Jane Walsh
- Zachary Ray Sherman as Adam Spangler, Caleb's maternal uncle
- Daniel Kountz as Ray Wood
- Marlyn Mason as Grandmom Spangler, Caleb's maternal great-grandmother
- Katee Sackhoff as Karen Gotatus
- Karen Johnson Miller as Coach Mary
- Tyler Gannon as Melody
- Sherilyn Lawson as Dr. Ross
- Joe Ivy as Dr. Warsaw
- Rebecca Nachison as Mrs. Knapp
- Jan Brehm as Mrs. Crawley
- Angela Uherbelau as Carmela
- Kaci Baxter as Holly
- Skylar Thiel-Klare and Karina Thiel-Klare as Allison Wales
- Victor Morris as Tom

== Reception ==
A review in TV Guide said, "Susan Cuscuna's teleplay functions as an instructional video on how parents should handle a teenager's unplanned motherhood....What distinguishes this glorified Afterschool Special is its handling of the disintegration of a family under pressure. Dysfunctional parents and jealous siblings share the spotlight with a physically precocious teen, whose heedless behavior has long-term impact on several lives."

According to Variety, Fifteen and Pregnant helped to mark a new era of programming for Lifetime, which subsequently became known for high-quality original movies in the early 2000s.
