= Johnny E. Jensen =

Danish-American cinematographer (born 1947)

Johnny E. Jensen (born 1947) is a Danish-American cinematographer. He is best known for the films Rambling Rose, Grumpy Old Men, and Rosewood, and the television film Into the Badlands for which he received a Primetime Emmy nomination.

Jensen was born in Copenhagen, Denmark and immigrated to the United States at age 20. He has been a member of the American Society of Cinematographers since 1994.

Since 2011 he has taught cinematography as a faculty member at Chapman University's Dodge College.

== Filmography ==
=== Films ===
- Material Girls (2006)
- The Game of Their Lives (2005)
- WiseGirls (2002)
- Morgan's Ferry (2001)
- The Ladies Man (2000)
- Rosewood (1997)
- Three Wishes (1995)
- Angie (1994)
- Grumpy Old Men (1993)
- Lost in Yonkers (1993)
- Benefit of the Doubt (1993)
- Rambling Rose (1991)

=== Television ===
- Heartland (2007, seven episodes)
- Deceit
- Two Against Time (2002)
- The Ponder Heart (2001)
- The Flamingo Rising (2001)
- Swing Vote (1999)
- Crazy in Love (1992)
- Into the Badlands (1991)
- Bare Essentials (1991)
