= List of U.S. cities named after their state =

This is a list of U.S. cities (or census-designated areas) named for the state in which they are located. Locations which are no longer functioning cities (including former cities and present ghost towns) are marked with an asterisk (*).

- Alabama City, Alabama* (Now part of Gadsden, AL zip code)
- Arizona City, Arizona
- Arkansas City, Arkansas
- California City, California
- Colorado City, Colorado
- Colorado Springs, Colorado
- Dakota Dunes, South Dakota
- Delaware City, Delaware
- Florida City, Florida
- Idaho City, Idaho
- Idaho Falls, Idaho
- Illinois City, Illinois
- Illiopolis, Illinois
- Indianapolis, Indiana
- Iowa City, Iowa
- Jersey City, New Jersey
- Kansas City, Kansas
- Kanopolis, Kansas
- Maryland City, Maryland
- Minnesota City, Minnesota
- Minneapolis, Minnesota
- Mississippi City, Mississippi* (Now part of Gulfport, MS zip code)
- Missouri City, Missouri
- Montana City, Montana
- Nebraska City, Nebraska
- Nevada City, Nevada*
- Adaven, Nevada* (Nevada spelled backwards)
- New York Mills, New York
- New York, New York
- Ohio City, Ohio
- Oklahoma City, Oklahoma
- Oregon City, Oregon
- Tennessee City, Tennessee* (Now part of Dickson, TN zip code)
- Tennessee Ridge, Tennessee
- Texas City, Texas
- Virginia City, Virginia* (Now part of St. Paul, VA zip code)
- Virginia Beach, Virginia
- Wisconsin Dells, Wisconsin
- Wisconsin Rapids, Wisconsin
