= Vanessa Greene =

American film producer

- Born: Vanessa Linsell; 15 September 1954; London, England
- Died: 13 December 2017 (aged 63); Rancho Mirage, California, U.S.
- Occupation: Television producer
- Spouse: David Greene (1975-1981)

Vanessa Greene (née Linsell; 15 September 1954 – 13 December 2017) was a British-American television producer and screenwriter. She served as a producer or executive producer on several made-for-television films, including Stolen Women: Captured Hearts (1997) starring Janine Turner, Monday After the Miracle (1998) starring Roma Downey, Under the Influence (1986) starring Andy Griffith, and Wait Till Your Mother Gets Home! (1983) starring Paul Michael Glaser. She co-wrote the teleplay for the Star Trek: The Next Generation episode "The Loss" with Alan J. Adler. She married British director David Greene in 1975; they divorced in 1981.

== Selected filmography ==
- Murder at 75 Birch (1998) TV movie, producer
- Before He Wakes (1998) TV movie, supervising producer
- Our Son, the Matchmaker (1996) TV movie, co-executive producer
- Nothing Lasts Forever (1995) TV miniseries, producer
- Search for Grace (1994) TV movie, producer
- With Hostile Intent (1993) TV movie, producer
- Deadly Desire (1991) TV movie, producer
- Secret Witness (1988) TV movie, producer
