= Games '74 =

- Official Games logo
- Directed by: John King; Sam Pillsbury; Paul Maunder; Arthur Everard
- Produced by: David H. Fowler; Lance J. Connolly
- Starring: the competitors
- Edited by: Paul Maunder; Beth Butler; Stanley Harper
- Music by: Malcolm Smith
- Production company: National Film Unit
- Release date: 1974
- Running time: 106 min.
- Language: English

Games '74 is a 1974 New Zealand–made documentary film of the 1974 British Commonwealth Games, held in Christchurch, New Zealand, from 24 January to 2 February 1974. The full title was Games '74: Official Film of the Xth British Commonwealth Games, Christchurch, New Zealand, 1974.

The feature-length documentary in colour and on 35 mm was shot and processed by the New Zealand National Film Unit (NFU). The directors became prominent in New Zealand film-making in the next two decades, and one of the location assistants, one Sam Neill, went on to an international career.

The spectator's-eye camera avoids camera comment. The prime targets are track events, then field events, with “elephantine drama” from the male weightlifters and shots of the marathon which go outside the stadium. There is a surprisingly (for the time) gender-balanced and apolitical narrative which underlines the humanity of the competitors as much as it shows the drama of success and failure” according to Sam Edwards, although “woman’s events receive scant coverage”. Divers are captured in slow motion, and a “series of high jumpers, using similar techniques to cross the bar are edited in collapsed sequence, reminding viewers of salmon exploding up a waterfall”.

The film has been restored and is available on DVD.
