= 1974 British Commonwealth Games =

Multi-sport event in Christchurch, New Zealand

X British Commonwealth Games
- Host city: Christchurch, New Zealand
- Nations: 38
- Athletes: 1276
- Events: 121 events in 10 sports
- Opening: 24 January 1974
- Closing: 2 February 1974
- Opened by: Prince Philip, Duke of Edinburgh
- Queen's Baton Final Runner: Sylvia Potts
- Main venue: QEII Park

The 1974 British Commonwealth Games were held in Christchurch, New Zealand, from 24 January to 2 February 1974. The bid vote was held in Edinburgh at the 1970 British Commonwealth Games. The event was officially named "the friendly games", and was the last edition to include "British" in the title; the 1978 edition (and every subsequent edition) was simply the Commonwealth Games.

There were 1,276 competitors and 372 officials, according to the official history, and public attendance was excellent. The main venue was the QEII Park, purpose-built for this event, which included the athletics stadium, fully covered Olympic standard pool, diving pool, and practice pools.

The Games village was located at the University of Canterbury and had accommodation in the halls of residence and a dining hall for the competitors.

The theme song was "Join Together", sung by Steve Allen. The event was held after the 1974 Commonwealth Paraplegic Games in Dunedin for wheelchair athletes.

== Host selection ==
1974 Commonwealth Games bidding results
City	Round 1
(New Zealand) Christchurch	36
(Australia) Melbourne	2

== Preparation ==
=== Security ===
The event was the first large international athletic event after the murder of Israeli athletes at the 1972 Munich Olympics. The Athletes Village, the student accommodation of the University of Canterbury, was temporarily fenced in and guarded for the duration of the games. Only official vehicles and persons were allowed into sensitive areas around the venues.

=== Logo ===
The logo was the second (after Edinburgh) to be protected and trademarked, and set a design benchmark which was echoed in the logos of the next five games. The logo was designed by Wellington designer Colin Simons as the result of a design competition, and posters were designed by Bret de Thier. In recent years the logo has been regarded as one of New Zealand's iconic symbols, being reproduced on clothing and elsewhere.

== Venues ==
- Queen Elizabeth II Park – ceremonies, athletics
- Cowles Stadium – badminton
- Woolston Working Men's Club – bowls
- Canterbury Court – boxing
- Denton Park Velodrome – track cycling
- Christchurch Town Hall – weightlifting, wrestling
- McLeans Island – shooting (smallbore)
- West Melton – shooting (largebore)
- Yaldhurst – shooting (trap, skeet)
- Cashmere/Beckenham/Huntsbury – road cycling
- University of Canterbury – athlete's village
- QEII Leisure Centre - diving, swimming

== Opening ceremony ==
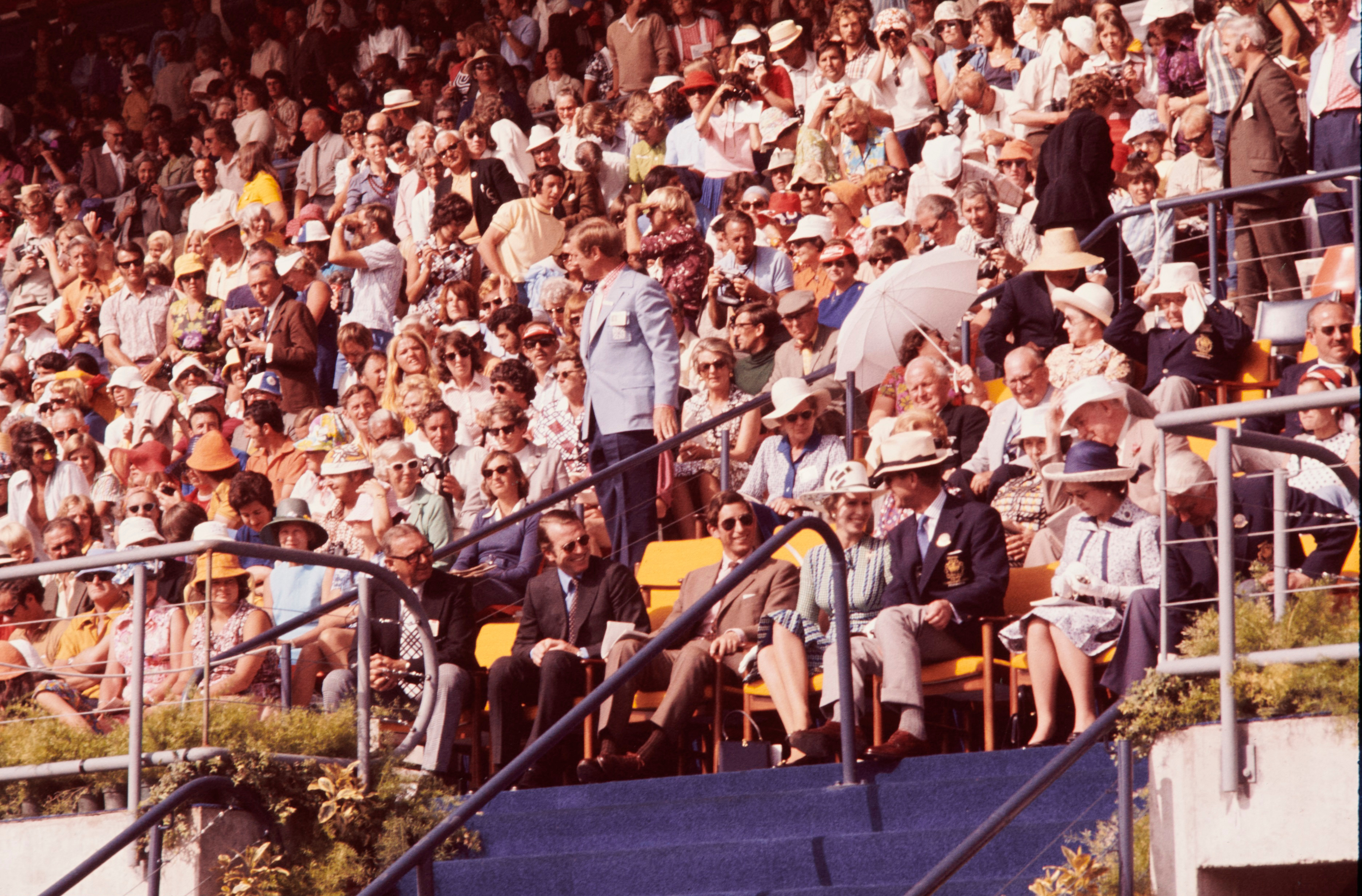
Elizabeth II, Prince Philip, Duke of Edinburgh, Princess Anne and Charles, Prince of Wales in attendance at the Games

The opening ceremony was held in the mid afternoon, with Prince Philip as the attending royal. A fanfare announced the guard of honour by the New Zealand Defence Forces, inspected by Prince Philip. This was followed by the raising of flags of the past, present, and future hosts. God Save the Queen was sung. The field was then invaded by 2500 school children in red, white and blue rain slicks all forming in the centre to create the NZ74 symbol. The official promotional song, 'Join Together', composed especially for the games by Steve Allen, was performed by a mass choir, as well as 'What the world needs now is love'. A Māori concert group then performed action songs and a haka, before the teams march past. The athletes then took the oath and Sylvia Potts, the runner who fell mere meters from a gold medal finish in the 1970 Games, entered the stadium with the Queen's Baton. It was presented to Prince Philip who read the message from the Queen declaring the 1974 Christchurch 10th British Commonwealth Games open. The Commonwealth flag was then marched in and hauled up with a 21-gun salute.

== Broadcasting ==
The Games were also an important milestone in New Zealand television, marking the introduction of colour television. However, due to the NZBC's limited colour facilities, only athletics, swimming, and boxing could be broadcast in colour.

Meanwhile, paralleling the television coverage, the National Film Unit produced Games '74, a feature-length documentary of the Christchurch games (and the many events) in full colour. This has since been restored and is available on DVD.

== Legacy ==
=== Economic aspects ===
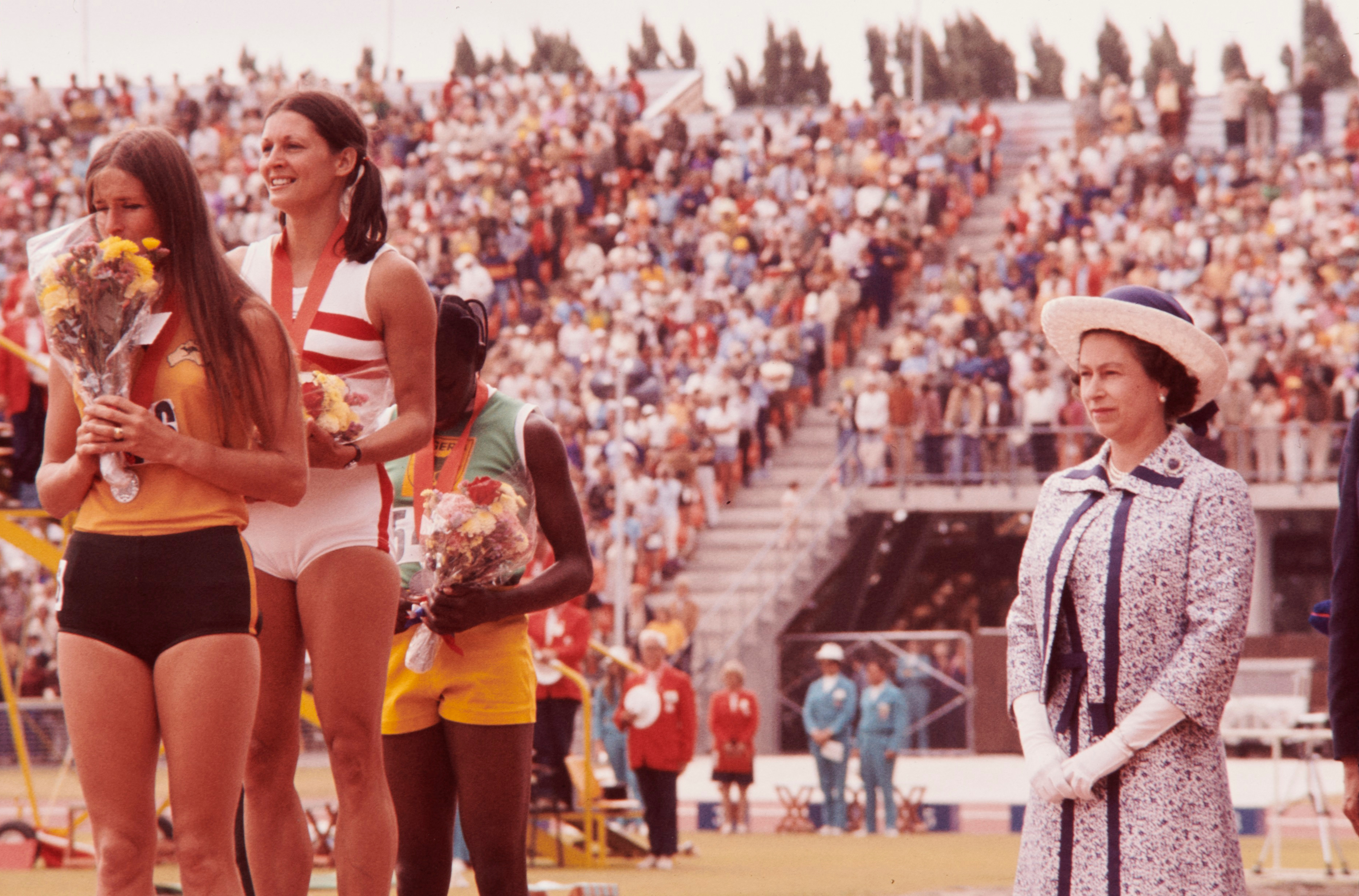
Elizabeth II at a medal ceremony

Christchurch was (and still is) the smallest city to host the modern televised Commonwealth Games. This was the first games that tried using the "Olympic" look with a standard colour scheme for facilities, passes, flags, stationery, and above all uniforms (which wearers only borrowed, but could buy outright as a memento thus helping keep costs down).

Its striking NZ74 design logo is now a well used (sometimes illegally) symbol of New Zealand as a nation and Christchurch as a city. It is still copyright owned by Christchurch City Council but is allowed for free use unless for commercial gain. Badges, lapels, stationery and postcards are still in re-manufactured circulation.

This was also the first time that a city had asked the Games Federation to allow commercial advertising. This was voted down as the Federation feared that advertising by big corporations would remove focus away from the amateur ethos of the Games. As no commercial hoardings were allowed, Christchurch got around this with the use of "sponsorship", one example being General Motors providing a lease fleet of Holden HQ Kingswood sedans that would be sold off after the games. The cars are now sought after by private and museum collectors and have depreciated little in value. Air New Zealand allowed large NZ74 symbols to be placed on the fuselage sides of the airline's brand new McDonnell Douglas DC-10s, giving free advertising around the world. This in itself set a trend since with airlines vying to be "official airline" of a particular event.

Although the Games themselves were a success, making a then sizable profit of $500,000, the "sponsorship" was nowhere near enough. The City of Christchurch was left with a financial facilities management debt (QEII Park) of what would be in today's (2016) amount of NZ$120 million. This deterred the city from hosting major events until 1990 when the government stepped in with lotteries funding to clear the remaining debt. By then, Auckland's 1990 games had been fully commercialized.

Queen Elizabeth II Park The most visible facility left behind by the 1974 Commonwealth Games was the purpose-built stadium and swimming complex. For a few years after, the stadium was a popular destination for sports and leisure patrons who were well indulged in first class facilities. However the costs of maintaining the complex grew over time and soon other additions included hydro-slides and fun park outside on the large grassed area that was once the race course. Christchurch City Council, the owner of the complex continued to develop the ground and for five years from 1990, allowed the Canterbury Greyhound Club to run a track on the inner oval. The main swimming pool was adapted so it could be decked over for Basketball and Netball. Football and Rugby League returned to the stadium in 1995 on a more permanent basis and a minor refurbishment of the track saw athletics events become a main summer event again. Early plans for a hosting of the 2022 Commonwealth Games were in hand when the September 2010 earthquake of around 7.1 hit near Christchurch and damaged the facility. Assessors immediately reported that the damage was repairable and could be covered by insurance. The swimming pools were drained to await repair when the more devastating 22 February 2011 earthquake struck Christchurch, damaging the entire facility, already weakened, beyond economic repair. After laying abandoned for three years, the stadium was demolished and by 2016 the ground stabilized in preparation of more economical facilities and a connecting high school.

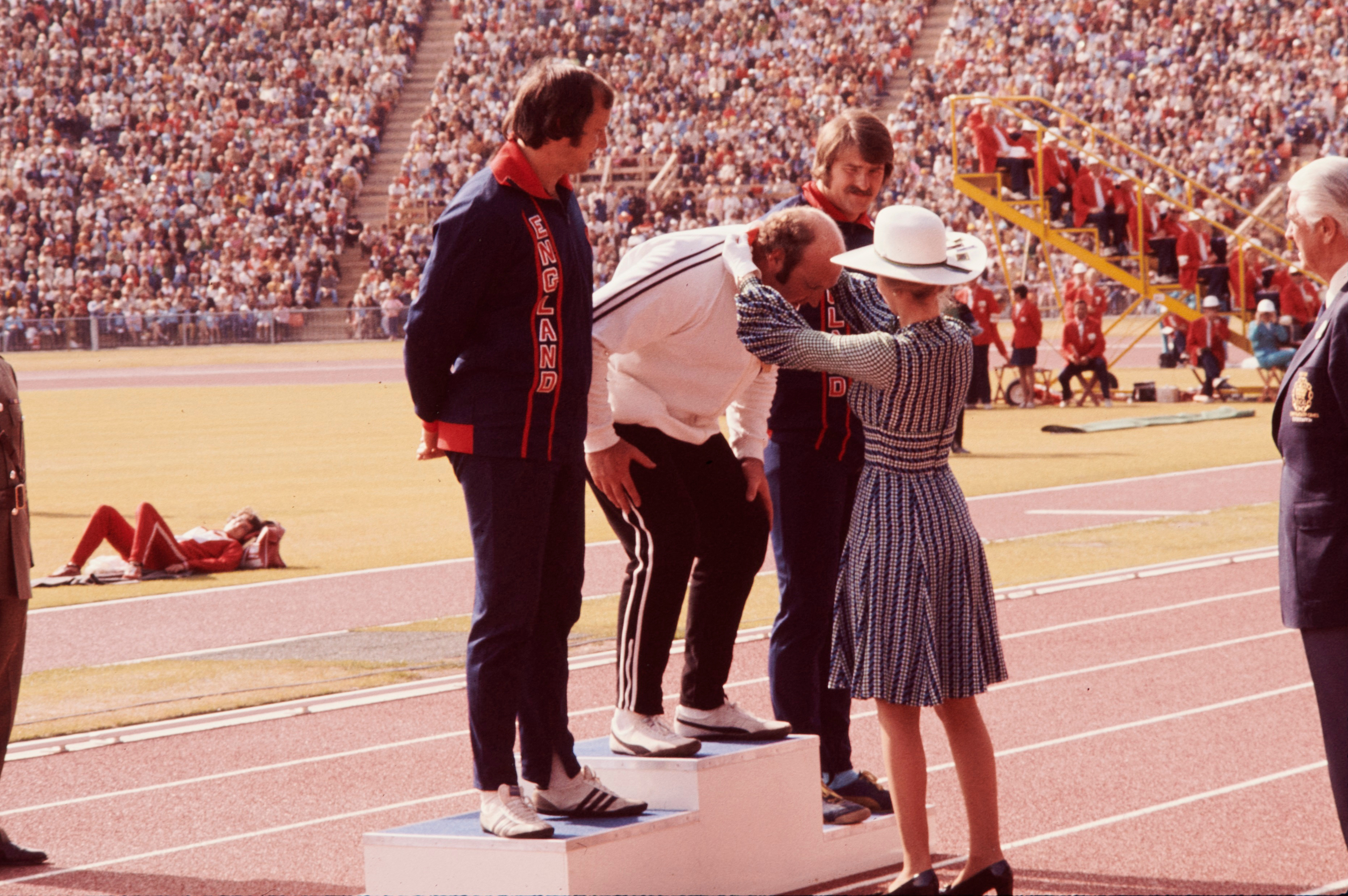
Robin Tait receives his gold medal from Princess Anne

Future 2026/2030 Bids proposals As a rebuilding legacy, there have been calls for Christchurch to bid for the new style Commonwealth Games that allow a core central city to host a more nationwide event. This has been seen as a more economical format for smaller cities, and countries to host what had become an expensive event for a singular city to host.

=== Precedents set ===
While the opening ceremony was a regimented and very formal affair, the late afternoon closing ceremony was anything but. This set a precedent for other closing ceremonies since then. With the formalities out of the way, the handing over of the flag to representatives of Edmonton, Alberta, Canada, the athletes broke ranks and ran amok, much to the delight of the packed stadium and the Queen herself. A flypast of the then Red Checkers RNZAF display team brought the ceremony to a close as the Queen and Prince Philip did a lap of honour around the stadium and departed.

The youngest competitor at the games was New Zealander Rebecca Perrott, 12 1/2; swimming for Fiji at the games, as her father was Registrar at the University of the South Pacific.

== Participating teams ==
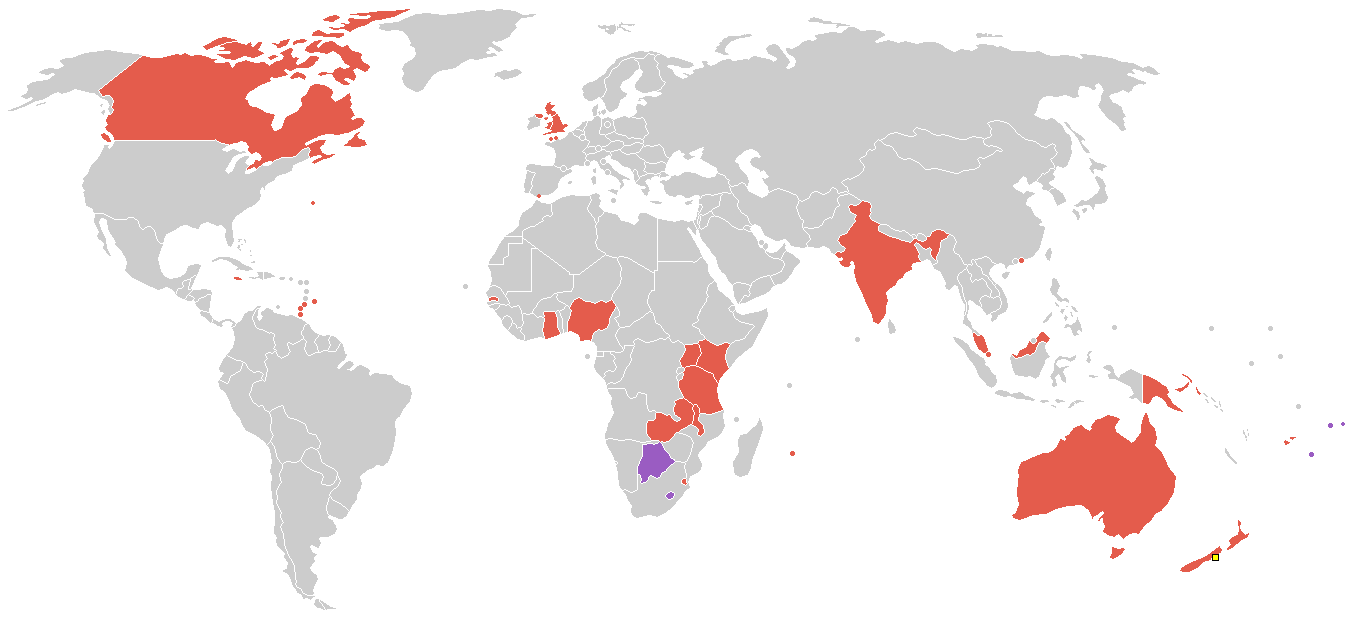
Participating countries

38 teams were represented at the 1974 Games.
(Teams competing for the first time are shown in bold).

- Australia (168)
- Barbados (4)
- Bermuda (5)
- **Botswana** (9)—**first appearance**
- Canada (115)
- **Cook Islands** (6)—**first appearance**
- England (154)
- Fiji (36)
- Ghana (21)
- Gibraltar (4)
- Grenada (1)
- Guernsey (13)
- Hong Kong (18)
- India (20)
- Isle of Man (15)
- Jamaica (13)
- Jersey (9)
- Kenya (58)
- **Lesotho** (10)—**first appearance**
- Malawi (15)
- Malaysia (14)
- Mauritius (10)
- New Zealand **(host)** (146)
- Nigeria (46)
- Northern Ireland (43)
- (Papua New Guinea) Papua and New Guinea (33)
- Saint Vincent and the Grenadines (1)
- Scotland (88)
- Singapore (8)
- Swaziland (4)
- Tanzania (32)
- **Tonga** (12)—**first appearance**
- The Gambia (2)
- Trinidad and Tobago (4)
- Uganda (27)
- Wales (69)
- **Western Samoa** (28)—**first appearance**
- Zambia (15)

=== Number of athletes by Commonwealth Games Association ===
Number of athletes by Commonwealth Games Association
Country	Athletes
Australia	168
Wales	69
Scotland	88
Northern Ireland	43
New Zealand	146
Canada	115
India	20
Singapore	8
(Papua New Guinea) Papua and New Guinea	33
England	154
Hong Kong	18
Malaysia	14
Nigeria	46
Uganda	27
Barbados	4
Western Samoa	28
Ghana	21
Tanzania	32
Kenya	58
Bermuda	5
Jamaica	13
Gibraltar	4
Botswana	9
Mauritius	10
Cook Islands	6
Fiji	36
Guernsey	13
Isle of Man	15
Lesotho	10
Tonga	12
Zambia	15
Jersey	9
Swaziland	4
Grenada	1
Malawi	15
Saint Vincent and the Grenadines	1
The Gambia	2
Trinidad and Tobago	4

== Medal table ==
* Host nation (New Zealand)

Medals won by nation
Rank	Nation	Gold	Silver	Bronze	Total
1	Australia	29	28	25	82
2	England	28	31	21	80
3	Canada	25	19	18	62
4	New Zealand*	9	8	18	35
5	Kenya	7	2	9	18
6	India	4	8	3	15
7	Scotland	3	5	11	19
8	Nigeria	3	3	4	10
9	Northern Ireland	3	1	2	6
10	Uganda	2	4	3	9
11	Jamaica	2	1	0	3
12	Wales	1	5	4	10
13	Ghana	1	3	5	9
14	Zambia	1	1	1	3
15	Malaysia	1	0	3	4
16	Tanzania	1	0	1	2
17	Saint Vincent and the Grenadines	1	0	0	1
18	Trinidad and Tobago	0	1	1	2
18	Western Samoa	0	1	1	2
20	Singapore	0	0	1	1
20	Swaziland	0	0	1	1
Totals (21 entries)		121	121	132	374

== Sports ==
- Aquatics
  - Diving ()
  - Swimming ()
- Athletics ()
- Badminton ()
- Boxing ()
- Cycling ()
- Lawn bowls ()
- Shooting ()
- Weightlifting ()
- Wrestling ()

== See also ==
- The Games Affair
- Sir Ron Scott

Preceded by Edinburgh	British Commonwealth Games; Christchurch; X British Commonwealth Games	Succeeded by Edmonton
