= Alice Constance Austin =

American architect

- Born: March 24, 1862; Chicago, Illinois, US
- Died: December 17, 1955 (aged 93)
- Occupation: Architect
- Projects: Llano del Rio

Alice Constance Austin (1862–1955) was an American architect, city planner, radical feminist, socialist, designer and utopist. Her most famous proposal at Llano del Rio, though never fully realized, greatly impacted later city designs and architectural planning. In 1935, Austin published her book The Next Step; How to Plan for Beauty, Comfort, and Peace with Great Savings Effected by the Reduction of Waste, discussing socialism, difficulties with the Llano del Rio project, and some of her other ideas on planning. Her feminist efforts in the history of city planning have gone so far as to influence the development of modern-day issues such as minimum wage, social security, low cost housing, welfare, and universal healthcare.

== Llano del Rio ==
Llano del Rio is Alice Constance Austin's most recognized project. She was hired in the early 1910s by Job Harriman, a socialist with the intentions to build a cooperative community in Palmdale, California. It was a circular city plan which included administrative buildings, restaurants, churches, schools, markets, etc. The houses had a modern feminist design and included plans for a kitchenless house, communal daycare areas, built-in furniture and heated tile floors; which would serve in cutting down the amount of domestic work done by women. Austin's feminist concepts greatly complemented the socialist ideas of Harriman because both approaches questioned the patriarchal history of social status. They attempted to envision a new type of city. The Llano Cooperative Community was never fully realized due to a lack of capital and water.

== City Planning and Modern Feminist Design ==
Austin proposed using a system of tunnels for laundry, a hot meal delivery service, commuters, and for the transportation of supplies and goods. This would result in less domestic housework, easier childcare, less road traffic, and free women from the traditional household duties, which could allow them to fully enter the public sphere, or non domestic world. She also included built-in furniture, roll away beds, and heated tile floors, which would reduce housework such as vacuuming and increase functionality in a limited space.

She also planned to change several things in the traditional domestic sphere. Her introduction of the kitchenless house, supported by the tunnel system, was efficient for women because it eliminated long hours of labor preparing meals for the family. A kitchenless house could theoretically promote healthier family interaction and care.

The garden city movement of Ebenezer Howard and the feminist influence of Charlotte Perkins Gilman helped inspire Austin's designs. In the public sphere, Austin chose to promote safety and affordability, as illustrated through her plans for public parks and low-income homes for women in need (either due to abuse, divorce, etc.). In the private sphere, she designed for comfort, efficiency, functionality, and collective domestic housework, which would reduce domestic labor in the home.

== See also ==
- Urban planning
- Dolores Hayden
