= Lowa Khatsa =

Tibetan fried animal lung

Lowa Khatsa is a dish in Tibetan cuisine. It is made of pieces of fried animal lung.
