= A Christmas Snow =

- Official film logo
- Directed by: Tracy J. Trost
- Written by: Tracy J. Trost; Candace Lee
- Produced by: Chad Gundersen
- Starring: Catherine Mary Stewart; Muse Watson; Anthony Tyler Quinn; Cameron Ten Napel; Danny Cahill
- Cinematography: Randy Stuehm
- Edited by: Randy Stuehm
- Music by: Bryan Popin
- Production company: Trost Moving Pictures
- Distributed by: Exploration Films
- Release date: October 1, 2010
- Running time: 110 minutes
- Country: United States
- Language: English
- Budget: $1,000,000 (estimated)

A Christmas Snow is a 2010 direct-to-video independent Christmas film by Trost Moving Pictures. It stars Catherine Mary Stewart, Muse Watson, Anthony Tyler Quinn and newcomer Cameron ten Napel. There is also a guest appearance by Danny Cahill as the Food Critic. A soundtrack based on the film is being produced by Bryan Popin. Author Jim Stovall will write a novelized version of A Christmas Snow.

== Plot ==
For the past 30 years, Kathleen (Catherine Mary Stewart) has carried around the haunting memory of her father abandoning her and her mother on Christmas Eve. She blames her mother for that night and now refuses to celebrate Christmas at all. Although she tries to forget her past, it has not forgotten her. Because of a blizzard, Kathleen finds herself stuck in her home with two strangers during the days leading up to Christmas. Sam (Muse Watson), a gentle older man Kathleen took in for the night, and Lucy (Cameron Ten Napel), the daughter of her soon to be fiancé (Anthony Tyler Quinn) bring her face to face with the hurts of her past. She has to choose between letting go and grabbing hold of a life-changing forgiveness, or continuing to carry her pain and bitterness.

== Production ==
A Christmas Snow was filmed in Tulsa, Oklahoma, on an 18-day schedule. The final scene was shot at the Greyhound Bus terminal at Fourth and Detroit streets. Filming was completed on February 25, 2010, after an overnight shoot.

== Distribution ==
Exploration Films signed on to take over distribution of the film in 2018

== See also ==
- List of Christmas films
