= Hotel Iowa =

- U.S. National Register of Historic Places
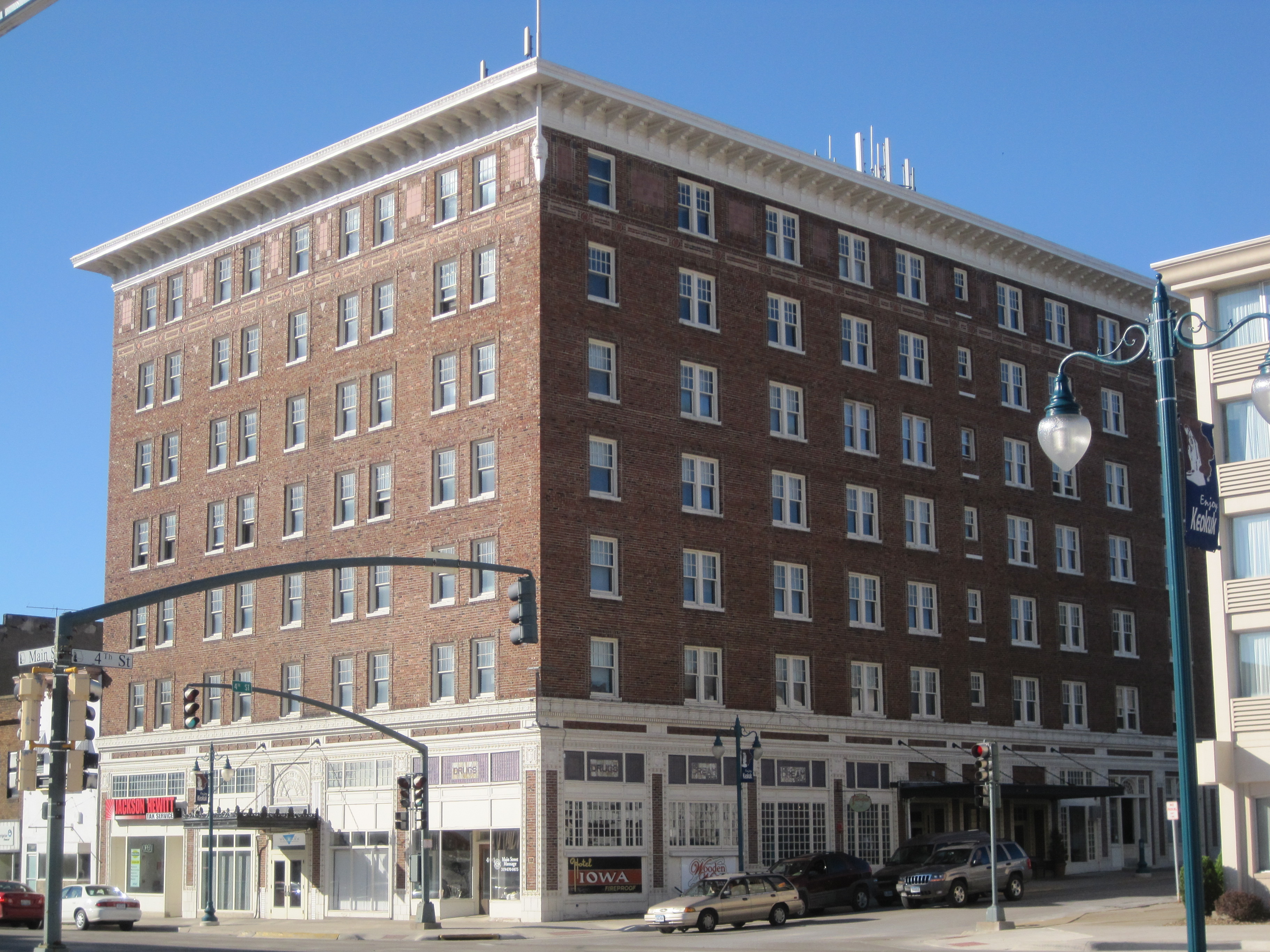

- Location within Iowa Location within the United States
- Location: 401 Main St. Keokuk, Iowa
- Coordinates: 40°23′43″N 91°22′55″W
- Area: less than one acre
- Built: 1912-1913
- Built by: Guaranty Construction Company
- Architect: Guy C. Mariner
- Architectural style: Commercial
- NRHP reference No.: 87000022
- Added to NRHP: February 5, 1987

The Hotel Iowa, now known as the Historic Hotel Iowa, is a historic building located in downtown Keokuk, Iowa, United States. It was built from 1912–1913 and it was listed on the National Register of Historic Places in 1987.

== History ==
A consortium of interests known as the Hotel Iowa Company, including the Mississippi River Power Company who had recently built the Keokuk Dam, planned for and built the hotel. The seven-story structure was designed by St. Louis architect Guy C. Mariner, and built from 1912 to 1913 by the Guaranty Construction Company of Chicago. The Hotel Iowa Company continued ownership until 1926 when it was sold to Ward B. Brown and his wife. For most of its history, the building has served as a hotel until it was converted into a commercial building. However, storefronts housing a variety of commercial interests have always existed on the first floor. The building is significant as the best example of the Chicago Commercial architectural style in the city. It was also the largest hotel in Keokuk and the only one built with "modern" construction methods utilizing "fireproof" and new structural building techniques.

== Architecture ==
The building follows a rectangular plan that measures 140 by 81 feet (43 by 25 m). It rises to a height of 74 feet (23 m). From the second to the seven floors the building is U-shaped. There is an eighth-floor level that houses the elevator machinery. The building is capped by a flat roof that has a raised parapet around its perimeter. The structure is supported by fifty-seven full height reinforced concrete columns. It also features concrete floors and roof with an exterior composed of brick and tile curtain walls. Sullivanesque ornamentation is featured on the main level, and a decorative belt course is located between the six and the seventh floors. The marquees above the Main Street and Fourth Street entrances are believed to be original.
