= Greer Robson =

New Zealand television actress

- Born: 16 October 1971 (age 53); New Zealand
- Occupation: Television actor

Greer Robson (born 16 October 1971) is a New Zealand television actress well known for her role in the television drama Shortland Street.

== Biography ==
Greer first came to prominence in the 1981 New Zealand film Smash Palace starring as Georgie alongside Bruno Lawrence, and starred in the 1987 film Starlight Hotel as Kate, but is most well known for her role as Nurse Joanna Jordan in Shortland Street. Since leaving the soap, Greer has guested as a celebrity on several other shows, including Celebrity Treasure Island, which she won. It was reported that Robson's win was pre-arranged and that the contestants did not pay attention to the rules. Robson later won the third season of New Zealand version of Dancing with the Stars, where she was the fifth celebrity eliminated. She was the temporary co-host of New Zealand's version of Wheel of Fortune, while regular host Sonia Gray was on maternity leave.

== Personal life ==
Greer is married to Scott Kirk and has two daughters, Sienna (born 2005) and Indigo (born 2006), and one son, Hudson (born 2010). Having studied both law and arts at the University of Auckland, graduating with Honours in her law degree, she later practised as a solicitor in major corporate law firms in both Auckland and Sydney.
