= Nevada City, Nevada =

Nevada City
- Ghost town
- Location within Nevada Location within the United States
- Coordinates: 39°26′15″N 118°40′17″W
- Country: United States
- State: Nevada
- County: Churchill
- Elevation: 3,930 ft (1,198 m)

Nevada City is a ghost town in Churchill County, Nevada, United States, located just east of Fallon, Nevada near the current intersection of State Route 118 and U.S. Highway 50. It was founded in 1916 as a socialist community known as the Nevada Cooperative Colony. The project folded in 1919 due to misleading advertising, mismanagement, and possibly dubious financial dealings by the Nevada Colony Corporation's directors, who were connected with the similar Llano del Rio colony near Los Angeles.

Another contributing factor to its demise was the unpopularity of its residents' stand against World War I. This led to two deaths. Churchill County Sheriff Mark Wildes was shot and killed when he attempted to arrest colonist Paul Walters, a socialist farmer formerly living in Oklahoma, as a draft evader. Walters, a husband and father of three, was tracked through the canyons and shot dead.

By 1919 most of the families had moved away, and the colony fell into receivership.
