= Iowa Township =

Iowa Township may refer to:

- List of Iowa townships

== Iowa ==
- Iowa Township, Allamakee County, Iowa
- Iowa Township, Benton County, Iowa
- Iowa Township, Cedar County, Iowa
- Iowa Township, Crawford County, Iowa
- Iowa Township, Dubuque County, Iowa, in Dubuque County, Iowa
- Iowa Township, Iowa County, Iowa
- Iowa Township, Jackson County, Iowa
- Iowa Township, Marshall County, Iowa
- Iowa Township, Washington County, Iowa
- Iowa Township, Wright County, Iowa

== Kansas ==
- Iowa Township, Doniphan County, Kansas
- Iowa Township, Sherman County, Kansas

== Nebraska ==
- Iowa Township, Holt County, Nebraska

== North Dakota ==
- Iowa Township, Benson County, North Dakota

== South Dakota ==
- Iowa Township, Beadle County, South Dakota, in Beadle County, South Dakota
- Iowa Township, Douglas County, South Dakota, in Douglas County, South Dakota
