= Health zone (Democratic Republic of the Congo) =

Operational health district in the Democratic Republic of the Congo

A health zone (French: zone de santé, often abbreviated ZdS or ZS) is the basic operational unit of the public health system in the Democratic Republic of the Congo (DRC).

Health zones deliver primary care, coordinate public health activities, and manage referral services for a defined population. They are overseen by a management team led by a Médecin chef de zone (zonal medical officer) and typically comprise a network of health centres linked to a general referral hospital.

== Overview ==
Under national norms, a health zone is a geographically delimited health district contained within a territory or commune. It is designed to ensure continuous, comprehensive primary health care and referral services for its population. Zonal coverage targets vary by context; standards indicate at least around 100,000 inhabitants in rural areas and around 200,000 in urban areas, while other planning documents describe typical coverage of about 100,000–150,000 inhabitants per zone.

As of the late 2010s and early 2020s, the number of health zones nationwide has been reported as 516–519, reflecting periodic administrative updates and dataset revisions.

== Organisation ==
Each zone comprises two interdependent service levels:

- Primary level: a network of centres de santé (health centres), each serving a catchment area known as an aire de santé (health area). Health areas generally cover about 5,000–10,000 people.
- Referral level: one Hôpital général de référence (general referral hospital, HGR), which provides the Complementary Package of Activities (Paquet complementaire d'activites, PCA) and clinical support to health centres that deliver the Minimum Package of Activities (Paquet minimum d'activites, PMA).

The zone's management structures typically include the Bureau central de la zone de santé (BCZS) — the central office housing the zonal management team, Équipe cadre de la zone (ECZ) — which plans, supervises, and evaluates services across facilities and coordinates with communities. At the community level, Comités de développement de l'aire de santé (CODESA) support governance and participation within health areas.

== Governance ==
A health zone is led by a zonal medical officer (Médecin chef de zone), a physician who heads the management team and is responsible for planning, quality assurance, supervision, and liaison with the provincial health division. The Ministry of Public Health sets policies and standards at the central level, while provincial health divisions coordinate implementation across zones.

== Coverage and infrastructure ==
According to a World Bank review (2019), the DRC had 516 health zones subdivided into 8,504 health areas, each with a health centre. Of the zones, 393 had government-run general referral hospitals; the remainder relied on faith-based or private facilities to serve as the referral hospital for the zone. More recent sources describe 519 zones across the country, indicating incremental changes in counts due to administrative updates and mapping refinements.

== Functions ==
Health zones are intended to:

- implement primary health care (including maternal, newborn, child and adolescent health; infectious disease control; and health promotion);
- organise referral and counter-referral between health centres and the HGR;
- plan, supervise, and evaluate service delivery; and
- engage communities through local health committees.

== See also ==
- Health in the Democratic Republic of the Congo
- Primary health care
