= 1990 in New Zealand =

- Decades: 1970s; 1980s; 1990s; 2000s; 2010s
- See also: History of New Zealand; List of years in New Zealand; Timeline of New Zealand history

The following lists events that happened during 1990 in New Zealand.

New Zealand celebrated its sesquicentennial, 150 years since the signing of The Treaty of Waitangi.

In the general election in October, National was elected in a landside victory.

GDP was $40.2 billion, unemployment was at 7.4% (March) and the exchange rate was 1 NZ$ per US$1.6750. This year New Zealand produced 8,000 million kWh of electricity.

== Population ==
- Estimated population as of 31 December: 3,410,400.
- Increase since 31 December 1989: 40,600 (1.20%).
- Males per 100 females: 97.3.

== Incumbents ==
=== Regal and viceregal ===
- Head of State – Elizabeth II
- Governor-General – Paul Reeves followed by Catherine Tizard

=== Government ===
The 42nd New Zealand Parliament continued, until the general election, held 27 October. The governing Labour Party was defeated. and The National Party, led by Jim Bolger, formed the new government.

- Speaker of the House – Kerry Burke then Robin Gray
- Prime Minister – Geoffrey Palmer then Mike Moore then Jim Bolger
- Deputy Prime Minister – Helen Clark then Don McKinnon
- Minister of Finance – David Caygill then Ruth Richardson
- Minister of Foreign Affairs – Russell Marshall then Mike Moore then Don McKinnon
- Chief Justice — Sir Thomas Eichelbaum

=== Parliamentary opposition ===
- Leader of the Opposition – Jim Bolger (National), until 2 November, then Mike Moore (Labour) .
- NewLabour Party – Jim Anderton (after 2 November General election)

=== Main centre leaders ===
- Mayor of Auckland – Catherine Tizard then Les Mills
- Mayor of Hamilton – Margaret Evans
- Mayor of Wellington – Jim Belich
- Mayor of Christchurch – Vicki Buck
- Mayor of Dunedin – Richard Walls

== Events ==
=== Unknown ===
- Telecom sold for $ 4.25 billion.
- New Zealand Bill of Rights Act passed
- The Tongariro National Park was inscribed on the UNESCO World Heritage list for its natural values.
- Creation of Te Wahipounamu World Heritage site
- The Royal New Zealand Navy tanker Endeavour and the frigates Wellington and Waikato were deployed to Bougainville as a neutral venue for peace talks between the government of Papua New Guinea and secessionist leaders of the Bougainville Revolutionary Army.
- New Zealand ratifies the Second Optional Protocol to the International Covenant on Civil and Political Rights.
- New Zealand and the Netherlands signed a reciprocal Social Security Agreement in October 1990, which came into effect in 1992.
- Banning of wood chip exports.
- Green Party of Aotearoa New Zealand is formed.
- Establishment of the Forest Heritage Fund (later renamed "Nature Heritage Fund").
- Ministry for the Environment Green Ribbon Award established
- Penny Jamieson, Anglican Bishop of Dunedin, was ordained the first women Diocesan bishop in the world.
- The New Zealand Phone Number Update begins and continues through to 1993, standardising telephone numbers in New Zealand to seven-digit local numbers and reducing the number of area codes from around 80 to just five.

=== January ===
- 24 January: Commonwealth Games are officially opened by Prince Edward in Auckland.

=== February ===
- 1–16 February: Her Majesty Elizabeth II of New Zealand visits.
- 3 February: Commonwealth Games are officially closed by Elizabeth II in Auckland, with New Zealand winning 58 medals,
- 6 February: New Zealand celebrates its sesquicentennial.

=== March ===
- 1 March – Royal New Zealand Navy discontinues the daily rum ration.

=== April ===
- 30 April: One- and two-cent coins are withdrawn from legal tender.

=== May ===
- 13 May: 6.2 Magnitude earthquake in Hawke's Bay

=== June ===
- 9 June – New Zealand Phone Number Update: Gisborne switches to seven-digit local telephone numbers.
- 29 June – New Zealand Phone Number Update: Ashburton and parts of suburban Christchurch switch to seven-digit local telephone numbers. The full transition in Christchurch would not be completed until 22 August 1992.

=== July ===
- 1 July: Tariffs were eliminated between Australia and New Zealand under the Closer Economic Relations agreement. This was five years ahead of schedule.
- 18 July: A new automatic telephone exchange comes into service at Waitangi on the Chatham Islands, phasing out the last manual telephone exchange in New Zealand.

=== August ===
- 24 August – New Zealand Phone Number Update: Timaru and Oamaru switch to seven-digit local telephone numbers.

=== September ===
- 4 September: Geoffrey Palmer: resigns as Prime Minister and is replaced by Mike Moore.

=== October ===
- 1 October: The Health Research Council of New Zealand is formed.
- 5 October – New Zealand Phone Number Update: Dunedin, Greymouth and Invercargill switch to seven-digit local telephone numbers.
- 13 October – New Zealand Phone Number Update: Napier and Hastings switch to seven-digit local telephone numbers.
- 27 October – New Zealand general election returns National with record number of seats – 67; Labour 29, NewLabour 1
- 27 October: Referendum to increase Parliamentary term from three to four years defeated: 30.7% For, 69.3% Against.
- October: The Edmonds factory in Christchurch is controversially demolished.

=== November ===
- 2 November: Jim Bolger becomes Prime Minister.
- 2 November: Don McKinnon becomes Deputy Prime Minister
- 2 November: Ruth Richardson became the first woman Minister of Finance.
- 3 November – New Zealand Phone Number Update: Whanganui switches to seven-digit local telephone numbers.
- 13 November: David Gray, an Aramoana resident, began a 22-hour shooting spree that left 13 people and Gray dead.

=== December ===
- Government announces $1.275 Billion worth of social welfare cuts.
- 12 December: Dame Catherine Tizard becomes first woman Governor-General of New Zealand.

== Arts and literature ==
- David Eggleton wins the Robert Burns Fellowship.

See 1990 in art, 1990 in literature, Category:1990 books

=== Music ===
==== New Zealand Music Awards ====
Winners are shown first with nominees underneath.

- Album of the Year: The Chills – Submarine Bells
  - Brian Smith – Moonlight Sax
  - Straitjacket Fits – Melt
- Single of the Year: The Chills – "Heavenly Pop Hit"
  - Margaret Urlich – Number One
  - Ngaire – To Sir With Love
- Top Male Vocalist: Barry Saunders
  - John Grenell
  - Barry Saunders
- Top Female Vocalist: Margaret Urlich
  - Patsy Riggir
  - Aishah
- Top Group: The Chills
  - Straitjacket Fits
  - Fan Club
- Most Promising Male Vocalist: Guy Wishart
  - Alan Galloway
  - John Kempt
- Most Promising Female Vocalist: Merenia
  - Ngaire
  - Caroline Easther
- Most Promising Group: Strawpeople
  - Merenia & Where's Billy
  - D-Faction
- International Achievement: Fan Club
  - The Chills
  - Margaret Urlich
- Best Video: Niki Caro – Bad Note for a Heart (Straitjacket Fits)
  - Paul Middleditch – One Good Reason (Strawpeople)
  - Lance Kelliher – Don't Let Me Fall Alone (The Fan Club)
- Best Producer: Ian Morris – Heartbroke
  - Carl Doy – Moonlight Sax (Brian Smith)
  - Murray Grindlay – Welcome To Our World
- Best Engineer: Strawpeople – Hemisphere
  - Ian Morris – Heartbroke (Rikki Morris)
  - Murray Grindlay – Welcome To Our World
- Best Jazz Album: No Award
- Best Classical Album: Dame Kiri Te Kanawa / Nszo — Kiri's Homecoming
  - Dame Malvina Major – Malvina Major
  - Kiri Te Kanawa/NZSO – Kiri at Aotea
- Best Country Album: The Warratahs – Wild Card
  - John Grenell – Welcome To Our World
  - Bartlett/ Duggan/ Vaughn – Together Again
- Best Folk Album: Rua — Commonwealth Suite
  - Martha Louise – Changing Tides
  - Iain Mitchell/Paul Yielder – Every Man And His Dog
- Best Gospel Album: Cecily Phio — Light in the Darkness
  - Sound Ministry – Lead Me to the Rock
  - Scripture in Song – We Will Triumph
- Best Polynesian Album: Herbs – Homegrown
  - National Maori Choir – Stand Tall
  - Te Mokai – Totara Tree
- Best Songwriter: Martin Phillips — Heavenly Pop Hit (The Chills)
  - Shayne Carter – Bad Note for a Heart (Straitjacket fits)
  - Barry Saunders – Wild Card
- Best Cover: John Collie – Melt (Straitjacket Fits)
  - Steve Garden/ Giles Molloy/ Kim Wesney – State of the Harp
  - Marc Mateo/ John Pitcairn – Hole
- Outstanding Contribution to the Music Industry: Murdoch Riley

=== Performing arts ===
- Benny Award presented by the Variety Artists Club of New Zealand to Billy T. James MBE.

=== Radio and television ===
- 1 January: Avalon becomes a separate limited liability company.
- 5 February: The Auckland Television Centre is opened by Elizabeth II.
- May: TV3 goes into receivership but continues broadcasting.
- May: Sky Television launches with three channels.
- May: CTV takes over TVNZ's Christchurch assets.

See: 1990 in New Zealand television, 1990 in television, List of TVNZ television programming, Category:Television in New Zealand, TV3 (New Zealand), Category:New Zealand television shows, Public broadcasting in New Zealand

=== Film ===
- An Angel at My Table
- Flying Fox in a Freedom Tree
- Meet the Feebles
- Ruby and Rata

See: Category:1990 film awards, 1990 in film, List of New Zealand feature films, Cinema of New Zealand, Category:1990 films

=== Literature ===
Once Were Warriors published.

== Sport ==
=== Athletics ===
- Tom Birnie wins his first national title in the men's marathon, clocking 2:17:33 on 3 March in New Plymouth, while Jillian Costley claims her third in the women's championship (2:36:43).

=== Commonwealth Games ===
| Gold | Silver | Bronze | Total |
|---|---|---|---|
| 17 | 14 | 27 | 58 |

=== Cricket ===
- State Championship, won by Auckland.

=== Horse racing ===
==== Harness racing ====
- New Zealand Trotting Cup: Neroship
- Auckland Trotting Cup: The Bru Czar

==== Thoroughbred racing ====
- Auckland Cup: Miss Stanima

=== Rugby union ===
- Ranfurly Shield
  - Retained by Auckland.
    - Auckland beat King Country 58-3 in Auckland.
    - Auckland beat Poverty Bay 42-3 in Gisborne.
    - Auckland beat Southland 78-7 in Auckland.
    - Auckland beat Otago 45-9 in Auckland
    - Auckland beat North Auckland 41-21 in Auckland
    - Auckland beat North Harbour 18-9 in Auckland
    - Auckland beat Canterbury 33-30 in Auckland
  - 16 June: The All Blacks beat Scotland 31 – 16 at Carisbrook.
  - 23 June: The All Blacks beat Scotland 21 – 18 at Eden Park.
  - 21 July: The All Blacks beat Australia 21 – 6 at Lancaster Park.
  - 4 August: The All Blacks beat Australia 21-18 at Eden Park.
  - 18 August: The All Blacks lose to Australia 9 – 21 at Athletic Park.
  - 3 November:The All Blacks beat France 24-3 at Stade de la Beaujoire.
  - 10 November: The All Blacks beat France 30-12 at Parc des Princes.

=== Shooting ===
- Ballinger Belt – Alistair "Sandy" Marshall (Kaituna/Blenheim)

=== Squash ===
- Susan Devoy wins the World Championship beating Martine Le Moignan 9-4, 9–4, 9–4.

=== Soccer ===
- The Chatham Cup is won by Mount Wellington who beat Christchurch United 3–3 (4-2 on penalties) in the final.
- New Zealand National Soccer League: Waitakere City
- The inaugural Winfield Provincial Championship was held between regional representative teams. The winner was Canterbury, who beat Auckland 2-1 (after extra time) in the final.

== Births ==
=== January ===
- 3 January – Monikura Tikinau, rugby league player
- 4 January
  - Liaki Moli, rugby union player
  - Augustine Pulu, rugby union player
- 5 January – Larissa Harrison, netball player
- 10 January – Dion Prewster, basketball player
- 11 January – Vaughn Scott, taekwondo practitioner
- 12 January – Neccrom Areaiiti, rugby league player
- 13 January
  - David Bishop, gymnast
  - Teneale Hatton, flatwater canoeist
- 14 January – Tom Scully, road and track cyclist
- 15 January – Kane Morgan, rugby league player
- 16 January
  - Jason Hicks, association footballer
  - Sam Prattley, rugby union player
- 17 January – Cameron Leslie, Paralympic swimmer
- 18 January – Taioalo Vaivai, rugby league player
- 19 January – Kerry-Anne Tomlinson, cricketer
- 22 January – Dean Whare, rugby league player
- 24 January – James Fuller, cricketer
- 25 January – Liam Coltman, rugby union player
- 29 January – Kalifa Faifai Loa, rugby league player

=== February ===
- 3 February – Martin Taupau, rugby league player
- 7 February – Elias Shadrock, netball player
- 10 February – Nathan Vella, rugby union player
- 11 February – Joe Tomane, rugby union player
- 12 February – Tamati Clarke, cricketer
- 13 February – Dan Hooker, mixed martial artist
- 19 February – Kosta Barbarouses, association footballer
- 20 February
  - Mark Abbott, rugby union player
  - Samuel Brunton, rugby league player
- 24 February – Morna Nielsen, cricketer
- 27 February - Elijah Taylor, rugby league player

=== March ===
- 1 March – Julianna Naoupu, netball player
- 3 March – Nardia Roselli, netball player
- 8 March – Gemma Dudley, track cyclist
- 9 March
  - Joel Everson, rugby union player
  - Matt Robinson, rugby league player
- 11 March – Aroha Savage, rugby union player
- 13 March – Josh Bloxham, basketball player
- 15 March – Rebecca Torr, snowboarder
- 16 March – Moira de Villiers, judoka
- 17 March - Billy Guyton, rugby union player(died 2023)
- 18 March – Lou Guinares, weightlifter
- 19 March – Fraser Colson, cricketer
- 22 March – Angus Ta'avao, rugby union player
- 24 March – Keisha Castle-Hughes, actor
- 26 March – Uini Atonio, rugby union player
- 27 March
  - Kimbra Johnson, recording artist
  - Leivaha Pulu, rugby league player
- 31 March – Tommy Smith, association footballer

=== April ===
- 1 April – Alecz Day, cricketer
- 2 April – Drury Low, rugby league player
- 7 April
  - Bundee Aki, rugby union player
  - George Bennett, road cyclist
  - Ronald Raaymakers, rugby union player
- 10 April
  - Kelsey Bevan, rower
  - Siuatonga Likiliki, rugby league player
- 13 April – Shane Pumipi, rugby league player
- 14 April – Sean Polwart, rugby union player
- 16 April – Kane Barrett, rugby union player
- 19 April – Benny Tipene, singer-songwriter
- 24 April – Amaka Gessler, swimmer
- 26 April
  - Terri-Amber Carlson, association footballer
  - Ashika Pratt, fashion model

=== May ===
- 2 May – Gemma Flynn, field hockey player
- 3 May
  - Sam Beard, rugby union player
  - Lama Tasi, rugby league player
- 9 May – Daniel Bell, swimmer
- 10 May – Oliver Leydon-Davis, badminton player
- 11 May – Blair Tarrant, field hockey player
- 14 May – William Lloyd, rugby union player
- 16 May – Renee Leota, association footballer
- 17 May
  - Charlie Gubb, rugby league player
  - Susannah Pyatt, sailor
  - Jason Woodward, rugby union player
- 18 May – Jossi Wells, freestyle skier
- 23 May – Pippa Hayward, field hockey player
- 28 May
  - Cody Cole, weightlifter
  - Gillies Kaka, rugby union player
- 30 May – Nigel Ah Wong, rugby union player
- 31 May – Tyler Bleyendaal, rugby union player

=== June ===
- 1 June – Frances Mackay, cricketer
- 4 June – Shay Neal, field hockey player
- 5 June – Amber Bellringer, netball player
- 6 June
  - Ben Funnell, rugby union player
  - Paige Hareb, surfer
- 7 June – Stephen Jenness, field hockey player
- 8 June – Todd Barclay, politician
- 15 June – John Gatfield, swimmer
- 17 June – Paul Lasike, American football player
- 21 June – Nafe Seluini, rugby league player
- 22 June – Abigail Guthrie, tennis player
- 24 June – Kalolo Tuiloma, rugby union player
- 26 June – Jake Gleeson, association footballer
- 29 June – Te Rina Keenan, discus thrower

=== July ===
- 2 July
  - Elias Shadrock, netball player
  - Bill Tupou, rugby league player
- 5 July – Tom Marshall, rugby union player
- 6 July – Willis Halaholo, rugby union player
- 9 July – Earl Bamber, motor racing driver
- 12 July – Simon Berghan, rugby union player
- 13 July – Kieran Foran, rugby league player
- 16 July – Bureta Faraimo, rugby league player
- 18 July – Gerard Beale, rugby league player
- 20 July
  - Jess Hamill, Paralympic athlete
  - Will Tupou, rugby union and rugby league player
- 24 July – Danny Lee, golfer
- 25 July – Ellen Halpenny, netball player
- 30 July - Myron Simpson, road and track cyclist
- 31 July – Orinoco Faamausili-Banse, swimmer

=== August ===
- 4 August – Betsy Hassett, association footballer
- 5 August – Anurag Verma, cricketer
- 6 August
  - Daniel Willcox, sailor
  - Nick Wilson, field hockey player
- 7 August – Julian Savea, rugby union player
- 8 August – Kane Williamson, cricketer
- 9 August
  - Darryl Fitzgerald, sprint canoeist
  - Michael O'Keeffe, association footballer
- 11 August – Tom Franklin, rugby union player
- 15 August – Tawera Kerr-Barlow, rugby union player
- 16 August – Matt Duffie, rugby union and rugby league player
- 17 August – Charlie Ngatai, rugby union player
- 20 August
  - Anna Green, association footballer
  - Jordan Hunter, basketball player
- 21 August – Rachel Maree Millns, beauty pageant contestant
- 28 August – James Coughlan, field hockey player

=== September ===
- 1 September
  - Tom Blundell, cricketer
  - Ben Seymour, rugby union player
- 3 September – Paul Snow-Hansen, sailor
- 6 September – Pama Fou, rugby union player
- 7 September
  - Paki Afu, rugby league player
  - Logan van Beek, cricketer
- 9 September – Shaun Johnson, rugby league player
- 11 September – Elijah Niko, rugby union player
- 12 September – Anna Peterson, cricketer
- 16 September – Emily Collins, road cyclist
- 17 September
  - Tim Myers, association footballer
  - Jimmy Neesham, cricketer
- 21 September – Sam Kasiano, rugby league player
- 23 September – Lea Tahuhu, cricketer
- 24 September
  - Kayne Hammington, rugby union player
  - Johnny McNicholl, rugby union player
  - Namatahi Waa, rugby union player
- 25 September – Genevieve Behrent, rower
- 27 September – Finn Tearney, tennis player
- 28 September – Doug Bracewell, cricketer

=== October ===
- 1 October – Finn Lowery, water polo player
- 7 October – Popsy, Thoroughbred racehorse
- 12 October – Shannon Francois, netball player
- 15 October – Harry Boam, cricketer
- 18 October – Anthony Gelling, rugby league player
- 23 October – Stan Walker, recording artist, actor, television personality
- 24 October – Tipene Friday, cricketer and basketball player
- 28 October
  - Sarah Gray, rower
  - Tim Johnston, cricketer
- 29 October – Craig Millar, rugby union player

=== November ===
- 2 November – Kane Radford, swimmer
- 4 November – Zane Tetevano, rugby league player
- 5 November – George Moala, rugby union player
- 8 November – Sacha Jones, tennis player
- 11 November
  - Sir Vancelot, standardbred racehorse
  - Merissa Smith, association footballer
- 12 November – Simon Evans, motor racing driver
- 17 November – Doriemus, Thoroughbred racehorse
- 18 November – Jackie Thomas, singer
- 19 November
  - Hayden Parker, rugby union player
  - Jeffery Toomaga-Allen, rugby union player
- 21 November - Jackson Ormond, rugby union player
- 22 November – Jason Saunders, sailor
- 26 November – Aaron Gate, track cyclist
- 28 November
  - Declan O'Donnell, rugby union player
  - Brendon Edmonds, rugby union player

=== December ===
- 2 December – Glen Fisiiahi, rugby union and rugby league player
- 3 December – Mark Ioane, rugby league player
- 4 December – Blade Thomson, rugby union player
- 5 December – Curtis Rapley, rower
- 7 December – Simon Berghan, rugby union player
- 11 December – Elizabeth Milne, association footballer
- 13 December – Corey Anderson, cricketer
- 15 December
  - Nehe Milner-Skudder, rugby union player
  - Ella Nicholas, slalom canoeist
  - Skye Lourie, actress
- 20 December – Robert Whittaker, mixed martial artist
- 22 December – Jason Christie, cyclist
- 26 December – Telusa Veainu, rugby union player
- 27 December – Priyani Puketapu, beauty pageant contestant
- 31 December – Marlon Williams, singer-songwriter

=== Exact date unknown ===
- Avianca Böhm, beauty pageant contestant
- Catherine Irving, beauty pageant contestant
- Jamie Love, softball player

== Deaths ==
=== January ===
- 1 January – Bill Pullar, athlete (born 1913)
- 7 January – Esther James, fashion model (born 1900)
- 20 January – Freda Cook, social and peace campaigner (born 1896)
- 22 January – William Stodart, rower (born 1904)

=== February ===
- 7 February – Tony Fomison, artist (born 1939)
- 12 February – Hilcote Pitts-Brown, politician (born 1905)
- 17 February – Rusty Robertson, rowing coach (born 1927)
- 27 February – Torchy Atkinson, horticultural scientist, science administrator (born 1909)

=== March ===
- 6 March
  - Joan Faulkner-Blake, broadcaster (born 1921)
  - Arthur Pearce, broadcaster (born 1903)
- 8 March – Donald Cameron, cricketer (born 1908)
- 11 March – Francis Ward, rugby union player (born 1900)
- 31 March – Bill Murray, police officer, unionist (born 1896)

=== April ===
- 8 April – Zamazaan, Thoroughbred racehorse (foaled 1965)
- 11 April – Leonard Leary, lawyer, writer (born 1891)
- 12 April – John Brown, cyclist (born 1916)
- 14 April – Doris Lusk, artist, potter (born 1916)
- 23 April – Alan Robilliard, rugby union player (born 1903)
- 26 April – Arthur Knight, rugby union player (born 1906)
- 28 April – Neil Watson, Mayor of Invercargill (born 1905)

=== May ===
- 4 May – Jack Lewin, union leader, public servant (born 1915)
- 7 May – Ashley Lawrence, conductor (born 1934)
- 10 May – Hilda Buck, cricketer (born 1914)
- 14 May – Ruth Mason, botanist (born 1913)
- 27 May
  - Clarrie Heard, swimmer (born 1906)
  - June Sutor, crystallographer (born 1929)
- 31 May – Hamilton Walker, engineer and inventor (born 1903)

=== June ===
- 3 June – Phil Gard, rugby union player (born 1947)
- 9 June – John Holland, athlete (born 1926)
- 11 June – Joan Stevens, English literature academic (born 1908)
- 14 June – Adrian Hayter, soldier, sailor, Antarctic leader, author (born 1914)
- 15 June – Eruera Mānuera, Ngāti Awa leader (born 1895)
- 19 June – Isobel Andrews, writer (born 1905)
- 20 June – Lois Suckling, optician, family planning reformer (born 1893)

=== July ===
- 1 July – Lorrie Hunter, politician (born 1900)
- 3 July – Vic Olsson, rower (born 1903)
- 4 July – Ces Devine, harness racing driver (born 1915)
- 9 July – Jack Sullivan, rugby union player, coach and administrator (born 1915)
- 24 July – Marcel Stanley, philatelist (born 1918)

=== August ===
- 6 August – Frank Waters, politician (born 1907)
- 8 August – Bill Gallagher, inventor, businessman (born 1911)
- 16 August – Pat O'Connor, professional wrestler (born 1924)

=== September ===
- 4 September
  - Sir Henry Cooper, cricketer, educator (born 1909)
  - Leslie Groves, cricketer (born 1911)
- 23 September – Bill Broughton, jockey (born 1913)
- 28 September – Dan Davin, author (born 1913)

=== October ===
- 2 October – Eric Giles, cricketer (born 1939)
- 3 October – Esmond de Beer, literary editor, collector, philanthropist (born 1895)
- 9 October – John Holland, Anglican bishop (born 1912)
- 10 October – Nitama Paewai, rugby union player and administrator, doctor, politician (born 1920)
- 12 October – John O'Brien, politician (born 1925)

=== November ===
- 9 November – Harry Evans, exploration geologist (born 1912)
- 13 November – Stewart Guthrie, police officer (born 1948)
- 15 November – Oswald Denison, rower (born 1905)
- 18 November – Murray Ashby, rower (born 1931)
- 22 November
  - James Barron, cricketer (born 1900)
  - Noel Chambers, swimmer (born 1923)
- 25 November – Ernest Duncan, mathematician (born 1916)
- 27 November – Joan Wood, educationalist and music teacher (born 1909)

=== December ===
- 14 December – Sam Cusack, community character (born 1919)
- 17 December – Frank Hutchison, cricketer (born 1897)
- 18 December – Greta Stevenson, mycologist (born 1911)
- 24 December – Alex O'Shea, farming leader (born 1902)
- 25 December
  - Viola Bell, sports administrator, community leader (born 1897)
  - Warwick Snedden, cricketer (born 1920)

=== Exact date unknown ===
- Bruce Campbell, lawyer, politician, jurist (born 1916)

== See also ==
- History of New Zealand
- List of years in New Zealand
- Military history of New Zealand
- Timeline of New Zealand history
- Timeline of New Zealand's links with Antarctica
- Timeline of the New Zealand environment
