= 1991 in New Zealand =

- Decades: 1970s; 1980s; 1990s; 2000s; 2010s
- See also: History of New Zealand; List of years in New Zealand; Timeline of New Zealand history

The following lists events that happened during 1991 in New Zealand.

== Population ==
- Estimated population as of 31 December: 3,516,000.
- Increase since 31 December 1990: 40,900 (1.18%) Note that there is a discontinuity between the 1990 and 1991 figures as Statistics NZ switched from using the de facto population concept to estimated resident population.
- Males per 100 Females: 99.7

== Incumbents ==
=== Regal and viceregal ===
- Head of State – Elizabeth II
- Governor-General – The Hon Dame Catherine Anne Tizard, GCMG, GCVO, DBE, QSO

=== Government ===
The 43rd New Zealand Parliament continued. Government was The National Party, led by Jim Bolger. National controlled nearly seventy percent of the seats in Parliament.

- Speaker of the House – Robin Gray
- Prime Minister – Jim Bolger
- Deputy Prime Minister – Don McKinnon
- Minister of Finance – Ruth Richardson
- Minister of Foreign Affairs – Don McKinnon
- Chief Justice — Sir Thomas Eichelbaum

=== Parliamentary opposition ===
- Leader of the Opposition – Mike Moore (Labour) .
- NewLabour Party – Jim Anderton

=== Main centre leaders ===
- Mayor of Auckland – Les Mills
- Mayor of Hamilton – Margaret Evans
- Mayor of Wellington – Jim Belich
- Mayor of Christchurch – Vicki Buck
- Mayor of Dunedin – Richard Walls

== Events ==
=== January ===
- 2 January: description

=== April ===
- 17 April: Prime Minister Jim Bolger stated, "We intend to keep New Zealand nuclear-free this term, next term, and the term after that."

=== May ===
- 25 May – New Zealand Phone Number Update: Palmerston North and the Manawatū area switches to seven-digit local telephone numbers.

=== July ===
- 5 July – New Zealand Phone Number Update: Nelson and Blenheim switch to seven-digit local telephone numbers.
- 22 July The Resource Management Act 1991 passes into law after a third reading speech by Simon Upton.

=== August ===
- 16 August – New Zealand Phone Number Update: The Bay of Plenty region (including Tauranga, Rotorua, Whakatāne and Taupō) switches to seven-digit local telephone numbers.

=== October ===
- 1 October The Resource Management Act 1991 commences
- 25 October – New Zealand Phone Number Update: Wellington and the Kapiti Coast complete their switch to seven-digit local telephone numbers.

=== November ===
- 22 November– New Zealand Phone Number Update: New Plymouth and most of the Taranaki region switches to seven-digit local telephone numbers.
- 29 November– New Zealand Phone Number Update: Masterton and the Wairarapa area switches to seven-digit local telephone numbers.

== Arts and literature ==
- Lynley Hood wins the Robert Burns Fellowship.

See 1991 in art, 1991 in literature, Category:1991 books

=== Performing arts ===
- Benny Award presented by the Variety Artists Club of New Zealand to Debbie Dorday.

=== Radio and television ===
- CanWest takes management control of TV3.

See: 1991 in New Zealand television, 1991 in television, List of TVNZ television programming, Category:Television in New Zealand, TV3 (New Zealand), Category:New Zealand television shows, Public broadcasting in New Zealand

=== Film ===
- A Soldier's Tale
- Chunik Bair
- Grampire
- Old Scores
- Te Rua
- The End of the Golden Weather

See: Category:1991 film awards, 1991 in film, List of New Zealand feature films, Cinema of New Zealand, Category:1991 films

=== Internet ===
See: NZ Internet History

== Sport ==
=== Athletics ===
- Paul Herlihy wins his first national title in the men's marathon, clocking 2:13:34 on 2 March in New Plymouth, while Lee-Ann McPhillips claims her first in the women's championship (2:40:12).

=== Horse racing ===
==== Harness racing ====
- New Zealand Trotting Cup – Christopher Vance
- Auckland Trotting Cup – Christopher Vance

=== Shooting ===
- Ballinger Belt –
  - Graeme Berman (Australia)
  - Geoffrey Smith (Malvern), second, top New Zealander

=== Soccer ===
- The Chatham Cup is won by Christchurch United who beat Wellington United 2–1 in the final.

== Births ==
=== January ===
- 1 January – Peter Burling, sailor
- 3 January – Joe Kayes, water polo player
- 4 January – Olivia Tennet, actor
- 5 January – Shane Savage, Australian rules footballer
- 7 January
  - Stephen Shennan, rugby union player
  - Ben Smith, cricketer
- 13 January – Mako Vunipola, rugby union player
- 16 January – James Lentjes, rugby union player
- 17 January
  - Kate Chilcott, road cyclist
  - Slade Griffin, rugby league player
  - Brad Weber, rugby union player
- 27 January
  - Beth Chote, actor
  - Sebastine Ikahihifo, rugby league player
- 28 January
  - Jordan Kahu, rugby league player
  - Mike Kainga, rugby union player
- 29 January – Luke Whitelock, rugby union player
- 30 January
  - Mitchell Graham, rugby union player
  - Matthew Wright, rugby league player

=== February ===
- 2 February
  - Caitlin Campbell, association footballer
  - Solomona Sakalia, rugby union player
- 3 February – Lima Sopoaga, rugby union player
- 7 February – Ben Murdoch-Masila, rugby league player
- 14 February – Michael Bracewell, cricketer
- 15 February – Matt McEwan, cricketer
- 16 February – Francis Saili, rugby union player
- 18 February
  - Danielle Hayes, fashion model
  - Stacey Michelsen, field hockey player
- 19 February – Ethan Mitchell, track cyclist
- 20 February – Julia Edward, rower

=== March ===
- 2 March – Mitchell Scott, rugby union player
- 4 March – Sue Maroroa, chess player
- 12 March
  - Alofa Alofa, rugby union player
  - Jed Brown, rugby union player
- 14 March
  - Taylor Gunman, road cyclist
  - Kurt Pickard, BMX racer
- 16 March – Michael Barry, cricketer
- 17 March – Dylan Dunlop-Barrett, swimmer
- 19 March – Colin Murphy, association footballer
- 20 March – Liam Squire, rugby union player
- 22 March
  - Jordan Grant, field hockey player
  - Amy McIlroy, lawn bowls player
- 23 March – Jenny Hung, table tennis player
- 25 March – Ryan Duffy, cricketer
- 26 March – Courteney Lowe, road cyclist
- 30 March – Jono Hickey, cricketer and rugby union player
- 31 March – Codie Taylor, rugby union player

=== April ===
- 1 April
  - Graham Candy, singer-songwriter
  - Iopu Iopu-Aso, rugby union player
- 2 April
  - Kara Pryor, rugby union player
  - Brad Shields, rugby union player
- 4 April – Sam Meech, sailor
- 6 April – Paratene McLeod, basketball player
- 9 April – Dominic Bird, rugby union player
- 10 April – Kirsten Pearce, field hockey player
- 17 April – Augusta Xu-Holland, actor
- 20 April – Daniel Hawkins, rugby union player
- 26 April – Isaac Liu, rugby league player
- 27 April – Dylan Collier, rugby union and rugby league player
- 29 April – Steven Luatua, rugby union player
- 30 April – Brett Hampton, cricketer

=== May ===
- 2 May – Patrick Bevin, road cyclist
- 3 May – Hannah Wall, association footballer
- 5 May – Joel Faulkner, rugby union player
- 7 May – Kenny Ardouin, cleft lip and palate community advocate
- 8 May – Waisake Naholo, rugby union player
- 9 May
  - Sosaia Feki, rugby league player
  - Harriet Miller-Brown, alpine skier
- 10 May – Gareth Anscombe, rugby union player
- 11 May – Tony Ensor, rugby union player
- 12 May
  - Elizabeth Chuah Lamb, high jumper
  - Greg Pleasants-Tate, rugby union player
- 15 May – Matt Moulds, rugby union player
- 20 May – Daryl Mitchell, cricketer
- 24 May – Ian McPeake, cricketer
- 25 May
  - Maritino Nemani, rugby union player
  - James Raideen, professional wrestler
- 27 May
  - Beauden Barrett, rugby union player
  - Kayla Pratt, rower
- 31 May – Brodie Retallick, rugby union player

=== June ===
- 3 June
  - Sarah McLaughlin, association footballer
  - Ava Seumanufagai, rugby league player
- 4 June
  - Matt McIlwrick, rugby league player
  - Ben Stokes, cricketer
- 5 June – Chloe Tipple, sports shooter
- 7 June – Amanda Landers-Murphy, squash player
- 9 June – Ben Lam, rugby union player
- 11 June – Nepo Laulala, rugby union player
- 13 June – Lachie Ferguson, cricketer
- 19 June – Zoe Stevenson, rower
- 23 June – Mikhail Koudinov, gymnast
- 25 June – Heiden Bedwell-Curtis, rugby union player
- 26 June – Dakota Lucas, association footballer

=== July ===
- 1 July
  - Annalie Longo, association footballer
  - Ruby Muir, endurance athlete
- 12 July – Portia Woodman, rugby union player
- 16 July – Sam Webster, track cyclist
- 20 July
  - Jarrad Butler, rugby union player
  - Sam Lousi, rugby league and rugby union player
- 24 July – Derone Raukawa, basketball player
- 27 July – Ricky Wells, speedway rider
- 28 July – Priyanka Xi, actor
- 31 July – Tony Lamborn, rugby union player

=== August ===
- 2 August
  - Tom Bruce, cricketer
  - Rob Thompson, rugby union player
- 5 August
  - Gareth Evans, rugby union player
  - Konrad Hurrell, rugby league player
  - Robert Loe, basketball player
- 13 August – Michael Cochrane, athlete
- 16 August – Angie Smit, athlete
- 22 August – Kenny Bromwich, rugby league player
- 29 August – Samantha Harrison, field hockey player
- 30 August – Ben Tameifuna, rugby union player

=== September ===
- 2 September – Adam Henry, rugby league player
- 4 September – Chevannah Paalvast, basketball player
- 5 September – Nepia Fox-Matamua, rugby union player
- 9 September – Adam Ling, rower
- 11 September – Rebecca Sinclair, snowboarder
- 13 September – Lee Allan, rugby union player
- 14 September – Ryan De Vries, association footballer
- 16 September – Luke Rowe, association footballer
- 19 September – Owen Ivins, cricketer
- 23 September – Cardiff Vaega, rugby union player
- 26 September – Look Who's Talking, thoroughbred racehorse
- 29 September – Stefi Luxton, snowboarder

=== October ===
- 5 October – Gareth Kean, swimmer
- 7 October – Stefan Marinovic, association footballer
- 12 October – Nabil Sabio Azadi, artist
- 15 October – Mandy Boyd, lawn bowls player
- 19 October – Michael Allardice, rugby union player
- 22 October – Levi Sherwood, freestyle motocross rider
- 26 October – Blair Soper, cricketer
- 27 October – Il Vicolo, standardbred racehorse
- 28 October – Duane Bailey, basketballer
- 29 October – Parris Goebel, dancer, choreographer and actor
- 31 October – Charles Piutau, rugby union player

=== November ===
- 5 November – Marco Rojas, association footballer
- 6 November – Matt Faddes, rugby union player
- 10 November – Ben Wheeler, cricketer
- 11 November – Kate Broadmore, cricketer
- 13 November – David Light, boxer
- 15 November – Henry Nicholls, cricketer
- 20 November – Tim Simona, rugby league player
- 21 November – Peni Terepo, rugby league player
- 22 November – Michael Vink, cyclist
- 24 November – Richie Stanaway, motor racing driver
- 27 November – Brooke Duff, singer-songwriter

=== December ===
- 1 December – Richard Moore, motor racing driver
- 3 December – Jarrod Firth, rugby union player
- 7 December
  - Samantha Charlton, field hockey player
  - Chris Wood, association footballer
- 11 December – Kahurangi Taylor, beauty pageant contestant
- 13 December – Ruby Tui, rugby sevens player
- 14 December
  - Ben Henry, rugby league player
  - Matt Henry, cricketer
- 22 December – Paul Alo-Emile, rugby union player

=== Exact date unknown ===
- Holly Cassidy, beauty pageant contestant
- Annah Mac, singer-songwriter

== Deaths ==
=== January–March ===
- 4 January – Vernon Sale, cricketer (born 1915)
- 12 February – Norman Fisher, boxer (born 1916)
- 17 February – Fuzz Barnes, political activist (born 1902)
- 18 February – Elizabeth Lissaman, potter (born 1901)
- 9 March – Esther Blackie, cricketer (born 1916)
- 14 March – Emily Carpenter, consumer advocate (born 1917)
- 17 March – Peter Gordon, politician (born 1921)
- 21 March – William Ditchfield, cricketer (born 1903)
- 28 March – Henry Field, educational psychologist (born 1903)

=== April–June ===
- 3 April – Peter Hooper, writer (born 1919)
- 9 April – June Litman, journalist (born 1926)
- 14 April – Bob Page, rowing coxswain (born 1936)
- 20 April – Clare Mallory, children's writer (born 1913)
- 28 April – Ngata Pitcaithly, educationalist (born 1906)
- 18 May – Horace Smirk, medical academic (born 1902)
- 31 May
  - Maida Clark, school principal, politician, community leader (born 1902)
  - Ian Milner, public servant, academic, alleged spy (born 1911)
- 6 June – Stella Jones, playwright (born 1904)
- 10 June – Jim Burrows, rugby union player and coach, cricketer, military leader (born 1904)
- 18 June – Eric Halstead, politician and diplomat (born 1912)
- 23 June – Charles Begg, radiologist and historian (born 1912)
- 28 June – Sydney Josland, bacteriologist (born 1904)

=== July–September ===
- 3 July – Trevor Horne, politician (born 1920)
- 17 July – John O'Sullivan, cricketer (born 1918)
- 21 July – Allan Wilson, biochemistry academic (born 1934)
- 7 August
  - Billy T. James, entertainer (born 1948)
  - Reginald Keeling, politician (born 1904)
- 8 August – John Marsdon, cricketer (born 1928)
- 22 August – Reuel Lochore, public servant and diplomat (born 1903)
- 25 August – Charles Willocks, rugby union player (born 1919)
- 17 September – Herb Mullon, philatelist (born 1905)
- 25 September – Te Reo Hura, Rātana leader (born 1904)
- 29 September – Sir Henry Kelliher, businessman and philanthropist (born 1896)

=== October–December ===
- 6 October – Bob Loudon, rugby union player (born 1903)
- 10 October – Jack Hunt, speedway rider (born 1921)
- 12 October – Murray Kay, association footballer (born 1905)
- 13 October – Sir William Gentry, military leader (born 1899)
- 22 October – Francis O'Brien, cricketer (born 1911)
- 25 October – Roy Parsons, bookseller (born 1909)
- 26 October – Clive Boyce, local-body politician (born 1918)
- 8 November – Billy Savidan, athlete (born 1902)
- 9 November – Jack Newton, rugby league player (born 1920)
- 10 November
  - Bill Gwynne, cricket umpire (born 1913)
  - Colin Johnstone, rower (born 1921)
- 11 November – Sir Tom Skinner, politician and trade union leader (born 1909)
- 12 November – Kamal Bamadhaj, human rights activist (born 1970)
- 24 November – Allan Pyatt, Anglican bishop (born 1916)
- 28 November – Te Kari Waaka, Ringatū minister and community leader (born 1916)
- 1 December
  - Zin Harris, cricketer (born 1927)
  - Jim Knox, trade union leader (born 1919)
- 2 December – Ted Spillane, rugby league player (born 1905)
- 6 December – Bill Beattie, photographer (born 1902)
- 12 December – Julia Wallace, educationalist, politician, community leader (born 1907)
- 20 December
  - Beatrice Beeby, Playcentre pioneer (born 1903)
  - Wi Huata, clergyman (born 1917)
- 21 December – Frank Solomon, rugby union player (born 1906)
- 24 December – Muriel Moody, potter and sculptor (born 1907)

== See also ==
- List of years in New Zealand
- Timeline of New Zealand history
- History of New Zealand
- Military history of New Zealand
- Timeline of the New Zealand environment
- Timeline of New Zealand's links with Antarctica
