= 1988 in New Zealand =

- Decades: 1960s; 1970s; 1980s; 1990s; 2000s
- See also: History of New Zealand; List of years in New Zealand; Timeline of New Zealand history

The following events occurred in New Zealand in the year 1988.

== Population ==
- Estimated population as of 31 December: 3,345,200.
- Increase since 31 December 1987: 3,100 (0.09%).
- Males per 100 females: 97.3.

== Incumbents ==
=== Regal and viceregal ===
- Head of State – Elizabeth II
- Governor-General – The Rt Revd. Sir Paul Reeves GCMG GCVO QSO

=== Government ===
The 42nd New Zealand Parliament continued. The fourth Labour Party government was in power.

- Speaker of the House – Kerry Burke
- Prime Minister – David Lange
- Deputy Prime Minister – Geoffrey Palmer
- Minister of Finance – Roger Douglas until 14 December, then David Caygill
- Minister of Foreign Affairs – Russell Marshall
- Chief Justice — Sir Ronald Davison

=== Parliamentary opposition ===
- Leader of the Opposition – Jim Bolger (National).

=== Main centre leaders ===
- Mayor of Auckland – Catherine Tizard
- Mayor of Hamilton – Ross Jansen
- Mayor of Wellington – Jim Belich
- Mayor of Christchurch – Hamish Hay
- Mayor of Dunedin – Cliff Skeggs

== Events ==
- The number of unemployed reaches 100,000.
- The Federation of Labour and Combined State Unions merge to form the Council of Trade Unions.
- New Zealand Post closed 432 post offices.
- Fisheries quota package announced for Mäori iwi.
- The Hokitika Guardian and Star ceases publication.
- 6 February – Waitangi Day celebrations at Waitangi are suspended.
- 7 March – Cyclone Bola strikes the East Coast of the North Island
- 30 March – The State Sector Act is passed to reform the Public Service.
- April – The Royal Commission on Social Policy issues its report.
- 5 April – Gibbs Report ("Unshackling the Hospitals") released.
- May – Picot Report on educational administration released.
- June – The electrification of the North Island Main Trunk railway between Hamilton and Palmerston North is completed.
- 1 July – The Government announces the return of Bastion Point to its Ngāti Whātua owners.
- 5 September – Telecom extends mobile phone service to Christchurch.
- 17 October – Kmart opens its first store in Henderson, Auckland.

== Arts and literature ==
- John Dickson wins the Robert Burns Fellowship.

See 1988 in art, 1988 in literature, Category:1988 books

=== Music ===
==== New Zealand Music Awards ====
Winners are shown first with nominees underneath.

- ALBUM OF THE YEAR Dave Dobbyn – Loyal
  - Shona Laing – South
  - The Warratahs – Only game in Town
- SINGLE OF THE YEAR Holidaymakers–Sweet Lovers
  - Dave Dobyyn – Love You Like I Should
  - Tex Pistol / Rikki Morris – Nobody Else
- BEST MALE VOCALIST Dave Dobbyn
  - Herbs
  - Barry Saunders
- BEST FEMALE VOCALIST Shona Laing
  - Aishah
  - Annie Crummer
- BEST GROUP Herbs
  - The Chills
  - The Warratahs
- MOST PROMISING MALE VOCALIST Peter Marshall
  - Rikki Morris
  - Thom Nepia
- MOST PROMISING FEMALE VOCALIST Mara Finau
  - Tracey Birnie
  - Helen Mulholland
- MOST PROMISING GROUP Holidaymakers
  - Straightjacket Fits
  - The Tunnellers
- INTERNATIONAL ACHIEVEMENT Neil Finn
  - The Chills
  - Shona Laing
- BEST VIDEO Fane Flaws – Sweet Lovers (Holidaymakers)
  - Janine Morell – Haere Mai
  - Paul Middleditch – Nobody Else
- BEST FILM SOUNDTRACK Dalvanius Prime / Dave Hurley – Poi E
  - Dalvanius / Ginane / Smith – Ngati
- BEST PRODUCER Nigel Stone–Holidaymakers (Holidaymakers)
  - Tex Pistol – Nobody Else
  - Stephen McCurdy/ Shona Laing/ Graeme Myhre – South
- BEST ENGINEER Nigel Stone–Holidaymakers (Holidaymakers)
  - Rhys Moody – Brazier'
  - Rhys Moody/ Doug Rogers – Sensation
- BEST JAZZ ALBUM Beaver – Live at Ronnie Scott's
  - Frank Gibsons Jazz Mobile – Spreading The Word
  - Sustenance – Sustenance 3
- BEST CLASSICAL ALBUM NZ Symphony Orchestra – Prodigal Country
  - NZ Symphony Orchestra – War and Peace/ Jack Winters Dream
- BEST FOLK ALBUM Mike Harding – From The Edge
  - Wayne Gillespie – Hearts For
  - David Hollis – With Love
- BEST COUNTRY ALBUM The Warratahs – Only Game in Town
  - Patsy Riggir – The Best OF (Plus Four)
  - Al Hunter – Jealous Guy
- BEST GOSPEL ALBUM Derek Lind – Strange Logic
  - Barry McGuire – Sailing Free
  - Stephen Bell Booth – Timeless
- BEST POLYNESIAN ALBUM Pātea Māori Club – Poi E
  - Kahurangi – Magically Maori
  - Dalvanius Prime/ Patea Maori/ Moana/ Dave Dobbyn / Kara Pewhairangi – Ngoi Ngoi
- BEST SONGWRITER Rikki Morris – Nobody Else
  - Hona/ Lundon/ Cassells – Listen
  - Dave Dobbyn – Love You Like I Should
- BEST COVER Lesley Maclean – Pagan in a Pagan Land
  - John Collie – Bird Dog
  - Susan Pryor – You Don't Need Me

See: 1988 in music

=== Performing arts ===
- Benny Award presented by the Variety Artists Club of New Zealand to Alma Woods MBE and Ricky May.

=== Radio and television ===
- 1 December: The Broadcasting Corporation of New Zealand is split into Radio New Zealand and Television New Zealand. The Avalon studio becomes a separate subsidiary of TVNZ.

See: 1988 in New Zealand television, 1988 in television, List of TVNZ television programming, Category:Television in New Zealand, TV3 (New Zealand), Category:New Zealand television shows, Public broadcasting in New Zealand

1988 New Zealand Listener Film and Television Awards

- Entertainment Programme: When the Cats Away, Alan Thurston, producer. Presenter Karen Sims
- Children's Programme: Spot On, Kim Gabara, producer
- Documentary Programme: Wild South Special: Black Robin, Rod Morris, producer/director
- Factual Series: Weekend, Bryan Williams, producer
- Drama Series: Erebus: The Aftermath, Caterina De Nave, producer
- Drama Programme: Erebus: The Aftermath, episode 2, Caterina de Nave, producer
- Television Director: Peter Sharp, Erebus: The Aftermath
- Best Male Performance in a Dramatic Role - Television: Ian Mune, Erebus: The Aftermath
- Best Female Performance in a Dramatic Role - Television: Ilona Rodgers, Gloss
- Entertainer: When the Cat's Away
- Writer, Non-Drama: Peter Hayden, Journeys in National Parks
- Writer, Drama: Greg McGee, Erebus: The Aftermath
- Live Coverage: Rugby World Cup Final, Michael Scott, director
- Original Music: Wayne Laird, Erebus: The Aftermath
- Stan Hosgood Award for Excellence in Allied Craft: Michael O'Connor, lighting Camera, Erebus: The Aftermath

==== Programme debuts ====
- 13 February – My Little Pony (TV One)
- 14 February – The World of David the Gnome (TV One)
- 29 February – DuckTales (Network 2)
- 29 February – Square One Television (Network 2)
- 1 March – The Book Tower (Network 2)
- 2 March – The Care Bears Family (Network 2)
- 2 March – Jem (Network 2)
- 3 March – The Curiosity Show (Network 2)
- 4 March – Fireman Sam (Network 2)
- 4 March – Bertha (Network 2)
- 28 March – Professor Poopsnaggle's Steam Zeppelin (Network 2)
- 21 April – The Gemini Factor (Network 2)
- 26 April – Simon and the Witch (Network 2)
- 9 May – The Elephant Show (Network 2)
- 13 May – The Ozlets (Network 2)
- 15 May – Teddy Horsley (TV One)
- 23 May – Pob's Programme (TV One)
- 20 May – Mother and Son (TV One)
- 1 June – Golden Pennies (Network 2)
- 1 June – Pink Panther and Sons (Network 2)
- 3 June – The ChuckleHounds (Network 2)
- 3 June – Storytime (Network 2)
- 25 July – Neighbours (Network 2)
- 26 July – The Charlie Brown and Snoopy Show (Network 2)
- 30 July – The Biskitts (TV One)
- 8 August – ALF: The Animated Series (Network 2)
- 9 September – Zoobilee Zoo (Network 2)
- 15 September – Henry's Cat (TV One)
- 17 September – Wildfire (TV One)
- 26 September – The Raggy Dolls (TV One)
- 14 October – Amigo and Friends (TV One)
- 23 October – Pinny's House (TV One)
- 31 October – Moondial (Network 2)
- 25 November – Tottie: The Story of a Doll's House (Network 2)
- 18 December – Edward and Friends (TV One)

=== Film ===
- Illustrious Energy
- Mauri
- Send a Gorilla
- The Grasscutter
- The Navigator: A Mediaeval Odyssey

See: Category:1988 film awards, 1988 in film, List of New Zealand feature films, Cinema of New Zealand, Category:1988 films

1988 New Zealand Listener Film and Television Awards

- Best Film: Ngati
- Best Original Screenplay: Tama Poata, Ngati
- Best Film Performance - Female: Judy McIntosh, Ngati
- Best Film Performance - Male: Wi Kuki Kaa, Ngati
- Best Director: Leon Narbey, Illustrious Energy
- Best Cinematographer: Alan Locke, Illustrious Energy
- Best Production Design: Jeanelle Aston, Illustrious Energy
- Best Musical Score: Jan Preston, Illustrious Energy
- Best Editing: David Coulson, Illustrious Energy
- Best Contribution to a Soundtrack: Bob Allen, Gethin Creagh & Mike Hopkins, Illustrious Energy
- Best Male Performance in a Supporting Role: Peter Hayden, Illustrious Energy
- Best Female Performance in a Supporting Role: Heather Bolton, Illustrious Energy

=== Internet ===
See: NZ Internet History

== Sport ==
=== Athletics ===
- Paul Ballinger wins his third national title in the men's marathon, clocking 2:16:05 on 30 April in Rotorua, while Jillian Costley claims her second in the women's championship (2:39:20).

=== Horse racing ===
==== Harness racing ====
- New Zealand Trotting Cup: Luxury Liner
- Auckland Trotting Cup: Luxury Liner – 2nd win

=== Olympic Games ===
==== Summer Olympics ====
- New Zealand sends a team of 83 competitors in 16 sports.

Gold	Silver	Bronze	Total
3	2	8	13

==== Winter Olympics ====
- New Zealand sends a team of nine competitors across three sports.

Gold	Silver	Bronze	Total
0	0	0	0

=== Paralympic Games ===
==== Summer Paralympics ====
Gold	Silver	Bronze	Total
2	4	11	17

==== Winter Paralympics ====
- New Zealand sends a team of three competitors in one sport.

Gold	Silver	Bronze	Total
0	1	0	1

=== Rugby ===
==== League ====
- 17 July – The 1988 Great Britain Lions tour concludes with New Zealand defeating Great Britain in a Test match at Addington Showground, Christchurch before a crowd of 8,525.
- 9 October – In the 1988 Rugby League World Cup final Australia defeats New Zealand at Eden Park, Auckland before a crowd of 47,363.

=== Shooting ===
- Ballinger Belt – John Whiteman (Upper Hutt)

=== Soccer ===
- The Chatham Cup is won by Waikato United who beat Christchurch United on the basis of away goals (2-2 and 1–1 in a two-leg final).

== Births ==
=== January ===
- 2 January – Joseph Paulo, rugby league player
- 3 January – Steven Kent, swimmer
- 4 January – Peter Saili, rugby union player
- 6 January – Esther Lanser, cricketer
- 11 January – Andre Taylor, rugby union player
- 12 January – Ben Afeaki, rugby union player
- 15 January – Riki Hoeata, rugby union player
- 17 January – Kade Poki, rugby union player
- 18 January – Andrew Wheeler, basketball player
- 20 January – Rushlee Buchanan, cyclist
- 23 January – Shaun Kenny-Dowall, rugby league player

=== February ===
- 1 February – Katie Duncan, association footballer
- 2 February – Kieron Fonotia, rugby union player
- 3 February – Daniel O'Regan, rugby league player
- 7 February – Mataupu Poching, rugby league player
- 8 February
  - Graham Oberlin-Brown, rower
- 13 February – Eddy Pettybourne, rugby league player
- 15 February
  - Sam Anderson-Heather, rugby union player
  - Claire Garrood, cricketer
- 16 February
  - James Baker, cricketer
  - Sarah Murphy, biathlete
- 20 February – Troy Garton, boxer
- 23 February – Ashley Cooper, singer
- 24 February
  - Levi Hanssen, association footballer
  - Emma Hayman, tennis player
- 25 February – Lagi Setu, rugby league and rugby union player

=== March ===
- 6 March
  - Marina Erakovic, tennis player
  - Frank Halai, rugby union player
- 8 March – Hannah Broederlow, netball player
- 9 March – Ash Moeke, rugby union player
- 10 March – Josh Hoffman, rugby league player
- 17 March – Patrick Ah Van, rugby league player
- 18 March – Grace Rasmussen, netball player
- 20 March – Sonny Fai, rugby league player
- 21 March – Anthony Cherrington, rugby league player
- 23 March – Suaia Matagi, rugby league player
- 24 March – Matt Todd, rugby union player
- 30 March – Petrea Webster, field hockey player
- 31 March – Curtis McGrath, canoeist

=== April ===
- 5 April – Quade Cooper, rugby union player
- 14 April
  - Francis Mossman, actor
  - Dan Pryor, rugby union player
- 16 April – Simon Child, field hockey player
- 18 April
  - Sam Belkin, amateur wrestler
  - Erin Bermingham, cricketer
- 21 April – Niall Williams, rugby union and touch player
- 24 April – Junior Tia-Kilifi, rugby league player
- 25 April – Liam Foran, rugby league player

=== May ===
- 3 May – Brent Renouf, Australian rules footballer
- 4 May – Westley Gough, cyclist
- 5 May
  - Jaimee Lovett, canoeist
  - Ant Pedersen, motor racing driver
- 6 May
  - Evie, professional wrestler
  - Rhys Phillips, cricketer
- 11 May – Stephen Paea, American football player
- 13 May – Trent Renata, rugby union player
- 16 May
  - Marty Kain, cricketer
  - Daniel Quigley, rowing coxswain
- 17 May – Scott Curry, rugby union player
- 20 May – Nikki Hamblin, athlete
- 29 May – Tom Furniss, comedian
- 30 May – Antonio Winterstein, rugby league player

=== June ===
- 1 June – Natalie Rooney, sports shooter
- 6 June – Israel Dagg, rugby union player
- 8 June – Charlotte Kight, netball player
- 19 June – Grayson Hart, rugby union player
- 23 June – Nick McLennan, rugby union player
- 24 June – Ryan Sissons, triathlete
- 25 June – Eliana Rubashkyn, transgender refugee
- 28 June – Alana Millington, field hockey player

=== July ===
- 1 July – Kendra Cocksedge, cricketer and rugby union player
- 3 July
  - Cole Peverley, association footballer
  - Winston Reid, association footballer
- 6 July
  - Andrew de Boorder, cricketer
  - Jesse Sergent, cyclist
- 7 July – Katie Perkins, cricketer
- 8 July – Mike Harris, rugby union player
- 10 July – Sarah Walker, BMX rider
- 11 July – Paula Griffin, netball player
- 13 July – Robbie Fruean, rugby union player
- 16 July – Lyndon Sheehan, freestyle skier
- 18 July – Andrew Horrell, rugby union player
- 20 July – B. J. Anthony, basketball player
- 21 July – Julian Matthews, athlete
- 26 July
  - Derek Carpenter, rugby union player
  - Tetera Faulkner, rugby union player
- 27 July – John Hardie, rugby union player
- 31 July
  - Alex Glenn, rugby league player
  - Brackin Karauria-Henry, rugby union player

=== August ===
- 1 August
  - Tim Perry, rugby union player
  - Bodene Thompson, rugby league player
- 6 August – Kayla McAlister, netball and rugby union player
- 8 August – Brad Cachopa, cricketer
- 12 August – Suliasi Taufalele, rugby union player
- 14 August – Dave Thomas, rugby union player
- 15 August – Nasi Manu, rugby union player
- 18 August – Michael Boxall, association footballer
- 22 August – Sarah Major, actor
- 24 August
  - Cathryn Finlayson, field hockey player
  - Manu Maʻu, rugby league player
- 28 August – Kane Hames, rugby union player
- 29 August
  - Fritz Lee, rugby union player
  - Lewis Marshall, rugby union player

=== September ===
- 1 September – Ash Dixon, rugby union player
- 4 September – David Eade, rower
- 5 September – Jackson Willison, rugby union player
- 7 September – Tevita Koloamatangi, rugby union player
- 14 September
  - Callum Gibbins, rugby union player
  - Sean Maitland, rugby union player
- 16 September – Nathaniel Neale, rugby league player
- 17 September – Michael Fitzgerald, association footballer
- 18 September – Joe Moody, rugby union player
- 19 September – Rebecca Spence, triathlete
- 22 September – Jeet Raval, cricketer
- 23 September
  - Hayley Crofts, netball player
  - Ryan Crotty, rugby union player
- 25 September
  - Quentin MacDonald, rugby union player
  - Josh Rowland, rugby union player
- 30 September – Joelle King, squash player

=== October ===
- 3 October – Helen Collins, association footballer
- 4 October – Mitchey Greig, freestyle skier
- 5 October – Luke Braid, rugby union player
- 7 October
  - Kurt Baker, rugby union player
  - Michael Leitch, rugby union player
- 10 October – Rose McIver, actor
- 12 October – Sam Whitelock, rugby union player
- 14 October – Terefe Ejigu, athlete
- 16 October
  - Fiona Bourke, rower
  - Karl Filiga, rugby league player
- 18 October – Luuka Jones, slalom canoeist
- 19 October – Naturalism, Thoroughbred racehorse
- 27 October – Rodney Ah You, rugby union player
- 29 October
  - Roman Van Uden, cyclist
  - Kayne Vincent, association footballer

=== November ===
- 1 November
  - Nick Barrett, rugby union player
  - Hamish Carson, athlete
- 4 November – Paea Faʻanunu, rugby union player
- 8 November – Shaun Teasdale, archer
- 10 November
  - Lord Gyllene, Thoroughbred racehorse
  - Jeremy Su'a, rugby union player
- 14 November – Mitchell Crosswell, rugby union player
- 18 November – Lucy Oliver, athlete
- 20 November – Vicky Rodewyk, actor, model and dancer
- 21 November – Aaron Smith, rugby union player
- 22 November – Tu'u Maori, rugby league player
- 23 November – Tony Goodin, cricketer
- 25 November – Mat Luamanu, rugby union player
- 28 November
  - Daniel Kirkpatrick, rugby union player
  - Nic Mayhew, rugby union player
  - Christy Prior, snowboarder
- 29 November – Corey Webster, basketball player
- 30 November – Edward Purcell, rugby league player

=== December ===
- 1 December – Taione Vea, rugby union player
- 7 December – James Marshall, rugby union player
- 8 December – Simon van Velthooven, cyclist
- 11 December – Tim Southee, cricketer
- 12 December – Isaac John, rugby league player
- 13 December – James Tamou, rugby league player
- 16 December – Robin Cheong, taekwando competitor
- 17 December – Steve Rapira, rugby league player

=== Exact date unknown ===
- Eli Kent, playwright and actor
- Sam McCarthy, songwriter and musician

== Deaths ==
=== January–February ===
- 2 January – Bill Crawford-Compton, World War II air ace, air force commander (born 1915)
- 10 January – Ron King, rugby union player and selector (born 1909)
- 11 January – Arthur Collins, rugby union player (born 1906)
- 9 February – Zelma Roberts, writer (born 1915)
- 17 February – Reginald Uren, architect (born 1906)
- 23 February – Charlie Jackman, cricketer (born 1906)
- 29 February – Sister Mary Gabriel, nun, pharmacist (born 1904)

=== March–April ===
- 16 March – Harold Turbott, medical practitioner, public health administrator, broadcaster and writer (born 1899)
- 23 March – Cyril Walter, cricketer, field hockey player and coach, sports writer (born 1912)
- 30 March – Sir Donald McKay, politician (born 1908)
- 7 April – Christopher Rollinson, boxer (born 1928)
- 16 April – Doug Mudgway, amateur wrestler (born 1924)
- 17 April – Ormond Wilson, politician (born 1907)

=== May–June ===
- 9 May – Robert Alexander, cricketer (born 1911)
- 14 May – Fred Atkins, professional wrestler (born 1910)
- 22 May – Leslie Stephen-Smith, cricketer (born 1904)
- 24 May – Tom Burtt, cricketer (born 1915)
- 26 May – Neta Neale, theatre director, speech and drama teacher (born 1904)
- 27 May – Alwyn Warren, Anglican bishop, university chancellor (born 1900)
- 28 May – Evelyn Page, artist (born 1899)
- 1 June – Ricky May, musician (born 1943)
- 3 June – Christabel Robinson, vocational guidance and community worker (born 1898)
- 4 June – Elizabeth Turnbull, woollen mill worker (born 1885)
- 5 June – Brian Ashby, Roman Catholic bishop (born 1923)
- 9 June – Archie Currie, field hockey player (born 1933)
- 17 June – Cyril Crawford, cricketer (born 1902)
- 24 June
  - Alexander Astor, rabbi, community leader (born 1900)
  - Anthony Rohrs, cricketer (born 1961)
- 25 June – Neville Pickering, politician, mayor of Christchurch (1971–74) (born 1923)
- 30 June – Hubert Ryburn, university administrator (born 1897)

=== July–August ===
- 8 July – Enga Washbourn, artist and writer (born 1908)
- 12 July – Robert Monteith, cricket umpire (born 1937)
- 18 July – Ralph Bulmer, ethnobiologist (born 1928)
- 21 July – Dame Cecily Pickerill, plastic surgeon (born 1903)
- 24 July – May Smith, painter, engraver, textile designer (born 1906)
- 1 August – G. S. Carter, surveyor and road engineer (born 1910)
- 4 August – Brian Brake, photographer (born 1927)
- 5 August – Nora Sipos, humanitarian and welfare worker (born 1900)
- 28 August – Paul Whitelaw, cricketer (born 1910)
- 30 August – Sir Jack Marshall, politician, 28th Prime Minister of New Zealand (born 1912)
- 31 August – Ivan Tomašević, political activist (born 1897)

=== September–October ===
- 4 September – Rona Stevenson, politician (born 1911)
- 6 September – Mary Martin, netball player (born 1915)
- 11 September – Bernard Holman, artist (born 1941)
- 13 September – Ron Rangi, rugby union player (born 1941)
- 17 September – Jim Watt, rugby union player, paediatrics academic (born 1914)
- 9 October – Bob Goslin, boxer (born 1927)
- 31 October – Gwen Somerset, teacher, adult education director, educationalist, writer (born 1894)

=== November–December ===
- 1 November – Louis Johnson, poet (born 1924)
- 4 November – Saul Goldsmith, political candidate (born 1911)
- 7 November
  - Aubrey Begg, politician (born 1929)
  - Sir Douglas Carter, politician (born 1908)
- 12 November – Pat Perrin, potter (born 1921)
- 28 November – Robert Stewart, sailor (born 1906)
- 29 November – Thomas Lemin, cricketer (born 1905)
- 5 December – Monica McKenzie, dietitian (born 1905)
- 8 December
  - Airini Grennell, singer, pianist, broadcaster (born 1910)
  - Sir Andrew McKee, air force leader (born 1902)
- 10 December – Beau Cottrell, rugby union player, Rotarian (born 1907)
- 16 December – John Cameron, cricketer (born 1898)
- 21 December
  - Bruce Ferguson, army officer (born 1917)
  - Charlie Peek, child welfare administrator, billiards player (born 1904)
- 27 December – William Fea, rugby union and squash player (born 1898)

== See also ==
- List of years in New Zealand
- Timeline of New Zealand history
- History of New Zealand
- Military history of New Zealand
- Timeline of the New Zealand environment
- Timeline of New Zealand's links with Antarctica
