= Lemin =

Lemin may refer to:

- Lemin, Guangdong (乐民镇), township in Suixi County, Zhanjiang, Guangdong, China
- Lemin, Guangxi, (乐民镇), township in Pubei County, Qinzhou, Guangxi, China
- Lemin (乐民村), village in Jinggu Dai and Yi Autonomous County, Yunnan, China
- Lemin, character in the 2000s Japanese science fiction novel series Spider Riders

Lemin is also a surname. People with this surname include:

- George Lemin (1905–1988), New Zealand cricketer
- Greg Lemin (born 1968), Australian cricketer
- Various members of a family which formerly owned the Australian heritage house of Trelawny, Black Hill, Ballarat

== See also ==
- Lemon (disambiguation)
- Lenin (disambiguation)
