= Playcentre Aotearoa =

Early childhood organization in New Zealand

- Te Whānau Tupu Ngātahi
- Abbreviation: Playcentre
- Formation: 1941
- Type: Cooperative charitable trust
- Registration no.: CC37155
- Purpose: High quality early childhood education - a co-operative whānau/family experience
- Location: New Zealand
- Region served: New Zealand
- Members: Parents of children attending
- Staff: 561 (2022)
- Volunteers: 13503 (2022)
- Website: http://www.playcentre.org.nz

Playcentre Aotearoa is an early childhood education and parent cooperative organisation which operates parent-led early childhood education centres throughout New Zealand. While the concept originated in New Zealand, it is now also established in Japan.

Their mission is stated as "Whānau Tupu Ngātahi - Families growing together."

== History and spread ==
Before 1941 the prevailing philosophy in New Zealand child education was that education did not really start until children entered the formal, disciplinarian, school system.

The early beginnings of Playcentre were in Wellington in 1941. Mothers Joan Wood, Inge Smithells and Beatrice Beeby opened "nursery play centres" that aimed to support mothers and provide a social space for their children. Other centres soon opened in Christchurch and Auckland, leading to the formation of the New Zealand Federation of Nursery Play Centre Associations in 1948. Educationist Gwen Somerset became the first president of the association. She had already been involved with a community centre in Feilding that included classes on child development and parenting, as well as a cooperative playgroup, so she was a good fit to lead the growing movement.

From the start each Playcentre was a community-driven initiative. Centres were organised and run by volunteer parents utilising existing premises (e.g. church or community halls), with parents themselves acting as teachers and collective caregivers. This allowed the movement to easily spread, including to rural areas where other early childcare options were unavailable or impractical.

In 1951 Playcentre began an adult education programme to train volunteer parents in child development and education.

The Playcentre model has been copied by groups in other countries, including the Japan Playcentre Association, which was founded in 1999.

== Philosophy and practice ==
Playcentre was instrumental in introducing the concepts of learning through play to the early childhood setting in New Zealand. This philosophy has since been adopted throughout all New Zealand early childhood education centres through the New Zealand national curriculum for early childhood education, Te Whāriki.

The organisation believes that parents are the first and best educators of their children and children learn best when they initiate their learning through play (child-initiated play). Within the centres children and adults learn alongside each other, in agreement with the socio-cultural model of learning which posits that a child learns best when surrounded by trusted members of their community.

Children attend half day sessions, no more than 5 times a week. Children from 0 to 6 years, normally in mixed age groups, attend sessions run by parents. Groups are typically no larger than 30 children. As a cooperative, parent volunteers decide how their centre will run and are responsible for the education of their children.

Playcentre offers dedicated sessions for babies under 1 year old, called Space. Space is an acronym for "Supporting Parents Alongside Children's Education". In addition to childcare, sessions are designed to create connections between new parents and to provide a place for new parents to discuss parenting.

== Structure and regulations ==
Since 2019, Playcentre Aotearoa is a charitable trust. Previously every centre was part of one of 33 regional associations. Each association was supported by the national body, The New Zealand Playcentre Federation. All of these entities were amalgamated in 2019. In 2022 Playcentres voted at a special general meeting to replace the previous constitution with a new Deed of Charitable Trust. This change will centralise the financial operations of Playcentre in the trust, taking some administrative burden off individual centres and allow Playcentre to remain compliant with Ministry of Education guidelines.

Playcentres are chartered early childhood education providers with the New Zealand Ministry of Education. Each Playcentre is subject to audits by the Education Review Office to confirm the quality of Playcentre's programmes.

Playcentres are partially funded by the Ministry of Education under the Education and Training Act 2020. Government funding is on a per-session basis, and is determined by the number and ages of children, and the number of qualified supervising adults present. Playcentres typically also rely on additional community grants.

Since 2000, government policy has trended towards a focus on a qualified teacher-led curriculum for ECE providers to be funded. This conflicts with the principle of parent-led co-operative education — where most parents are not fully trained teachers — resulting in parent-led ECE services like Playcentre being "marginalised". To solve this, many Playcentres have chosen to employ one or more facilitators in their centre, who is employed by the trust and is a qualified ECE teacher, often through Playcentre's own education system. The facilitator supports the parents to organise the ECE aspects of sessions, while centre advisors help ensure compliance with Ministry of Education requirements for curriculum, supervision and government funding.

== Adult education programme ==
Playcentre Education offers the NZQA Level 4 Certificate in Early Childhood Education and Care. The course assists parents in developing their parenting skills and their ability to facilitate early childhood education in a playcentre setting. The programme also helps members to learn how to work in a cooperative as well as being the training ground for Playcentre adult educators. The adult education programme is delivered at no cost to the learner.

== Notable Playcentre people ==
Famous Playcentre alumni include New Zealand's first female prime minister, the Rt. Hon. Jenny Shipley, New Zealand's first female Governor General, Dame Catherine Tizard, the Olympic gold medallists, Caroline Evers-Swindell and Georgina Evers-Swindell, Colin Simon (designer of the Christchurch Commonwealth Games 1974 games – Christchurch, New Zealand symbol and the Playcentre Logo), and Valerie Burns (Companion of the Queen's Service Order).
