= Denis McGrath (lawyer) =

New Zealand lawyer and politician

Denis McGrath CBE
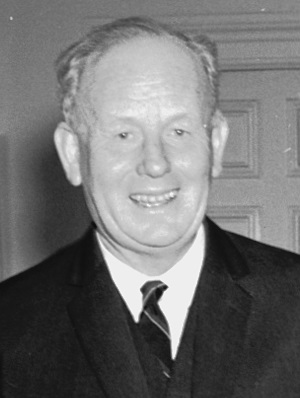
- McGrath in 1964

10th Deputy Mayor of Wellington
- In office 18 October 1962 – 30 August 1965
- Mayor: Frank Kitts
- Preceded by: Bill Arcus
- Succeeded by: Matt Benney

Personal details
- Born: John Denis McGrath; 17 June 1910 Wellington, New Zealand
- Died: 14 June 1986 (aged 75) Wellington, New Zealand
- Spouse: Margaret Fraser (m. 1944)
- Relations: John McGrath (son)
- Children: 4
- Education: Victoria University College
- Profession: Lawyer

For the Canadian–American screenwriter and producer, see Denis McGrath.

John Denis McGrath CBE (17 June 1910 – 14 June 1986) was a New Zealand local politician and lawyer. He was a Wellington city councillor, serving as deputy mayor between 1962 and 1965. He also served as president of the New Zealand Law Society from 1968 to 1971.

== Biography ==
=== Early life and career ===
Denis McGrath was born in Wellington on 17 June 1910, the eldest of three sons of lawyer John Joseph (Jack) McGrath and Caroline Margaret McGrath (née Wilkinson). He suffered bouts of ill-health as a child, and was educated at St Patrick's College before attending Victoria University College, where he graduated with a Bachelor of Laws in 1932. He then joined his father in a joint legal practice in 1933 under the firm name JJ & Denis McGrath. In 1944, he married Margaret Fraser and together had four children (including John McGrath). Following his father's death in 1946, McGrath carried on the firm alone for five years.

In 1957, he was elected to the council of Wellington District Law Society and in 1966 he became its president. Two years later, he became president of the New Zealand Law Society upon the appointment of Denis Blundell as High Commissioners to the United Kingdom, serving a three-year term which included the centenary celebrations of the society in 1969.

=== Political career ===
McGrath served two separate terms as a Wellington City Councillor. In 1947 he won a seat on the council on a Citizens' Association ticket which he was to hold until 1956 when he did not seek re-election. In 1962 he made a comeback to local-body politics and spent two more terms on the council until he retired in 1968. He represented the city on the council of Victoria University and in 1962 he was appointed to the office of deputy mayor. McGrath was also chairman of the powerful finance committee. He supported the agenda of urban renewal in the city proposed by councillor George Porter. Porter and councillor Gerald O'Brien visited McGrath's home after a council meeting to ensure his support, thinking it essential for the renewal to occur. O'Brien described McGrath as "a powerful intellectual force on council."

He was involved in a public selection controversy in 1965, where first-term councillor Matt Benney as chosen as the Citizens' nominee for the mayoralty by the association's executive, but Benney withdrew his nomination after it became evident that the majority of sitting Citizens' councillors instead favoured McGrath. However, McGrath refused to stand for the office of mayor and offered himself solely for the council. Benney was eventually acclaimed as the mayoral candidate, after which McGrath relented the role of deputy mayor to Benney as well.

In early 1968 he announced his mayoralty candidacy for the Citizens' Association. However, in June 1968 his appointment as president of the New Zealand Law Society became incompatible with his both his candidature and council commitments and he withdrew from both the mayoral race and did not contest a council seat either in order to focus on his duties at the Law Society.

He was also an active member of the National Party and was chairman of the Karori branch from 1961 to 1963.

=== Later life and death ===
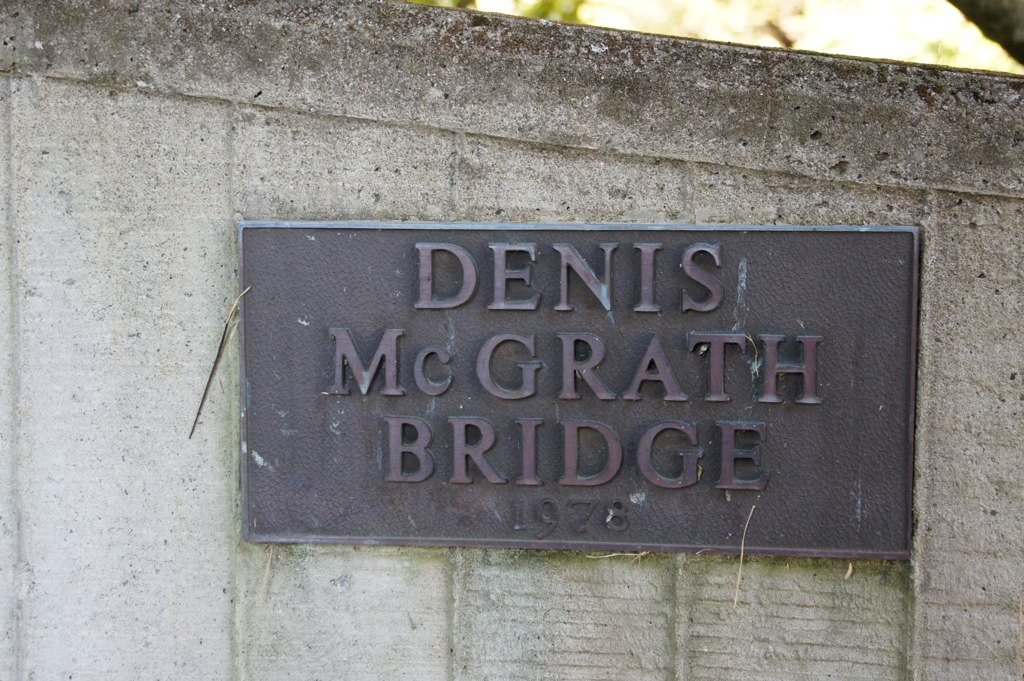
Plaque for the Denis McGrath Bridge

He was appointed by the government as the chair of three Committees of Enquiry. The first was in 1970 over industrial issues affecting Air New Zealand, the second in 1972 regarding equal pay for women, and the third in 1973 over a review of parliamentary salaries policy. McGrath was appointed a Commander of the Order of the British Empire in the 1972 Queen's Birthday Honours, for very valuable services to the community.

In 1978, the Wellington City Council finished construction of a pedestrian overbridge across the Wellington motorway (next to the Bolton Street Cemetery) which was named the Denis McGrath Bridge, in McGrath's honour.

McGrath died at Wellington on 14 June 1986, survived by his wife, two sons and two daughters.

== Notes ==
Political offices
Preceded by Bill Arcus	Deputy Mayor of Wellington; 1962–1965	Succeeded by Matt Benney
