= Nigel Ah Wong =

New Zealand rugby union player

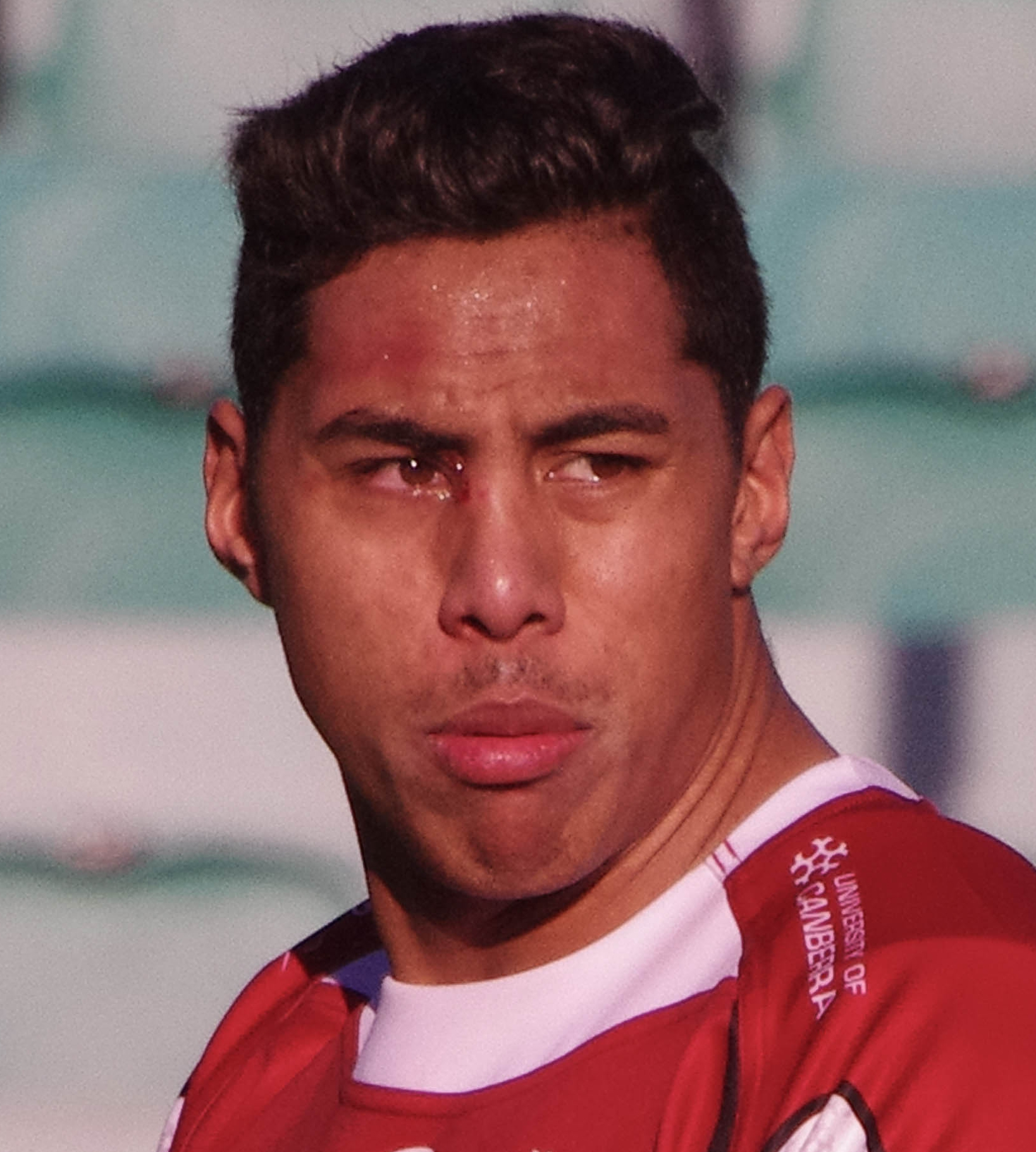
- Ah Wong representing Canberra Vikings during the National Rugby Championship
- Born: 30 May 1990 (age 36) Wellington, New Zealand
- Height: 1.93 m (6 ft 4 in)
- Weight: 102 kg (225 lb; 16 st 1 lb)
- School: Taita College

Rugby union career
- Position(s): Wing, Centre
Senior career
Years	Team	Apps	(Points)
2013	Coca-Cola Red Sparks	5	(0)
2014−2015	Canberra Vikings	18	(45)
2015−2017	ACT Brumbies	24	(30)
2016	Suntory Sungoliath	13	(10)
2017–2018	Counties Manukau	19	(35)
2017	Kintetsu Liners	6	(5)
2018–2019	Kobelco Kobe Steelers	10	(20)
2019	NSW Country Eagles	4	(10)
2020	Manawatu	7	(10)
2022, 2024	Moana Pasifika	11	(5)
2022	Blues	1	(0)
2022	Bay of Plenty	12	(10)
2024	Auckland	8	(20)
- Correct as of 6 November 2024
International career
Years	Team	Apps	(Points)
2022–	Samoa	14	(30)
- Correct as of 6 November 2024

Nigel Ah Wong (born 30 May 1990) is a professional rugby union player, who currently plays as a wing for Moana Pasifika in Super Rugby and Auckland in New Zealand's domestic National Provincial Championship. Born in New Zealand, he represents Samoa at international level after qualifying on ancestry grounds.

== Club career ==
Ah Wong played for Sunnybank in their inaugural Queensland Premier Rugby Hospital Cup victory in 2011. He played for the Melbourne Rebels on their 2011 European Tour after being selected for the 'Rebels Rising' development squad.

In 2012, Ah Wong was a member of the Australian Rugby Union's National Academy, and was also chosen to represent the Queensland Reds in their exhibition match against the Hurricanes on the Sunshine Coast.

Ah Wong joined the Reds Extended Playing Squad for the 2013 Super Rugby season. He was initially named in the Reds College Squad, but was promoted when Joel Faulkner was forced to withdraw due to personal commitments.

After the 2013 Super Rugby season, Ah Wong was recruited by the Coca-Cola West Red Sparks to play in the Japanese Top League.

In 2017, Ah Wong signed for Counties Manukau in New Zealand's domestic competition, the Mitre 10 Cup.

In 2020, Ah Wong played for the Manawatu Turbos in the Mitre 10 Cup. Two years later, he represented Bay of Plenty in the NPC.

On 29 July 2024, Ah Wong was named in the Auckland squad for the 2024 Bunnings NPC season.

== Career statistics ==
=== Club summary ===
As of 15 July 2017

Season	Team	Games	Starts	Sub	Mins	Tries	Cons	Pens	Drops	Points	Yel	Red
2015	Brumbies	7	1	6	153	0	0	0	0	0	0	0
2016	Brumbies	15	8	7	703	5	0	0	0	25	0	0
2017	Brumbies	5	2	3	179	1	0	0	0	5	0	0
Total		24	11	13	994	6	0	0	0	30	0	0
