= Lee-Ann McPhillips =

New Zealand long-distance runner

Lee Ann McPhillips
Personal information
- Nationality: New Zealand
- Born: 9 June 1964 (age 62) New Plymouth

Sport
- Sport: Running
- Event: Marathon
- Club: Hamilton City Hawks Athletic Club
Medal record
Women's athletics
Representing New Zealand
Oceania Championships
Gold medal – first place	1990 Suva	20km Road race

Lee-Ann McPhillips (born 9 June 1964 in New Plymouth) is a former long-distance runner from New Zealand. She runs for Hamilton City Hawks Athletic Club. She represented her native country at the 1998 Commonwealth Games and 2000 World Cross Country Championships. She was a two-time national marathon winner and two-time national 10k road race winner.

== Competition record ==
1990 OCEANIA CHAMPIONSHIPS 20 Kilometres Road Race (Fiji)

- Gold - 20k Road Race (1:22:22)

1991 Huntly Half Marathon

- Gold - (82.32)

1991 New Zealand Marathon (New Plymouth)

- Gold - Marathon (2:40:12)

1992 New Zealand Marathon (Auckland)

- Gold - Marathon (2:40:00)

1998 Commonwealth Games (Kuala Lumpur,)

- 5th place - Marathon (2'49:36)

1999 national 8000m Waikato-BOP Cross Country Champs

- Gold - (34:18)

1999 national 10k Road Race

- Gold - (30.06)

2000 national 10k Road Race

- Gold - (34:00)

2000 national 8000m Waikato-BOP Cross Country Champs

- Gold - (28.35)

2000 World Cross Country Championships (Vilamoura, Portugal)

- 67th place - (29:04; 68)

2001 Hamilton Women's Run

- Gold - (17:02)

2001 adidas New Zealand Track & Field Championships, women's 5000m, Hastings

- Bronze
