= The Tree (New Zealand play) =

1957 New Zealand play by Stella Jones

- Original language: English
- Written by: Stella Jones
- Subject: a daughter returns home after a 15 year absence, creating new strains in the family's relationships
- Genre: Drama

Premiere
- Date: 1957
- Place: Bristol, England

The Tree is a New Zealand play by Stella Jones that premiered in Bristol, England in 1957.

== Information ==
=== Subject ===
The play is set on the back porch of a New Zealand home and tells the story of a daughter returning home after 15 years' absence. The central relationship is between the mother, who has not achieved her life-long goals, and the daughter, who has experienced so much through her travels.

=== Honours and critical response ===
The play won second prize in the Southland Centennial Playwriting Competition in 1956, however it was rejected by a number of New Zealand theatres. It was subsequently purchased by a London agent and debuted in Bristol. After it achieved success in England, the New Zealand Players, who had previously rejected it, toured forty North Island towns with it in 1959. It was met with critical acclaim, The New Zealand Herald calling it "an adult, compelling and first-class piece of work". It was published in 1960 by Whitcombe and Tombs with New Zealand Literary Fund support.

Contemporary critics compared The Tree to Arthur Miller's style of playwriting, and particularly his 1947 play All My Sons, with its sparse dialogue and portrayal of a family under pressure. It was also compared to New Zealand playwright Bruce Mason's The Pohutukawa Tree, with comment that Jones' text read "much more smoothly" than Mason's.

1980s commentators on the play point out that the father's role is relatively insignificant, and that other of Jones' works also show strong female lead characters, although this gender-based analysis may not have been apparent to audiences in the 1950s.

The play is recommended reading for drama papers at the University of Auckland, and was included in a Landmark New Zealand Play Reading Series in 2012.
