= Matt Benney =

New Zealand civil servant and politician (1902–1980)

Matt Benney ISO
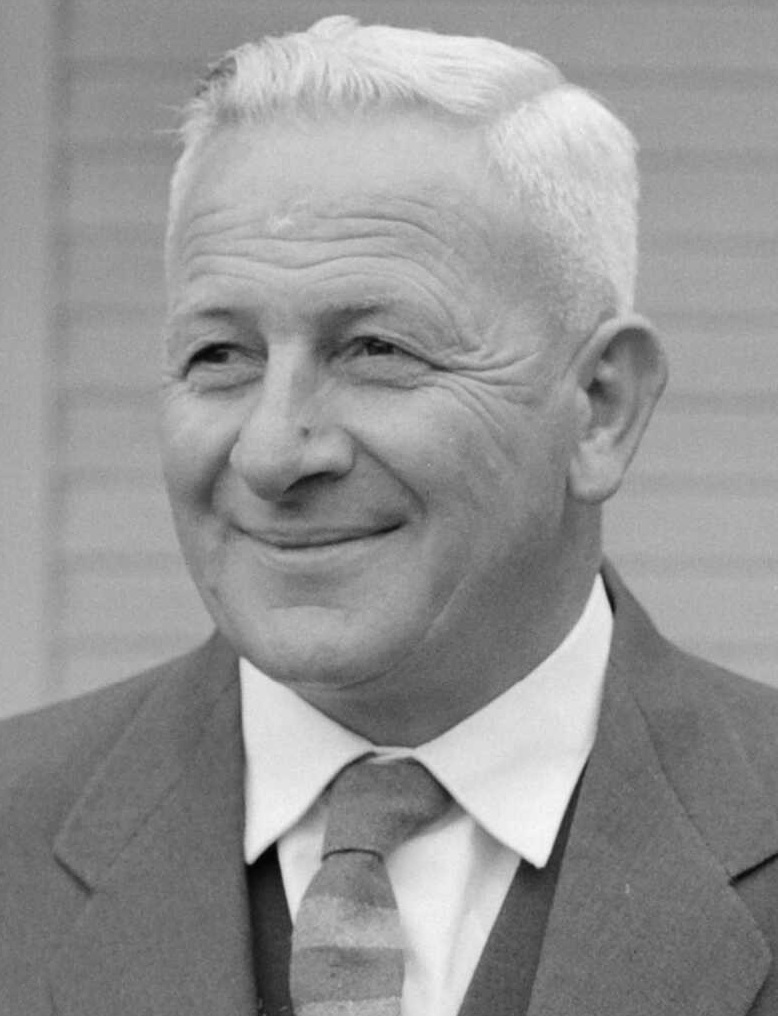
- Benney in 1959

11th Deputy Mayor of Wellington
- In office 30 August 1965 – 14 April 1966
- Mayor: Frank Kitts
- Preceded by: Denis McGrath
- Succeeded by: Bob Archibald

Member of the Wellington City Council
- In office 13 October 1962 – 14 April 1966
- Constituency: At-large

Personal details
- Born: 6 July 1902 Kaumati, New Zealand
- Died: 12 December 1980 (aged 78) Wellington, New Zealand
- Spouse: Phyllis Marjorie Jenkins
- Relatives: David Benney (son)
- Profession: Civil servant

Cecil Henry "Matt" Benney ISO (6 July 1902 – 12 December 1980) was a New Zealand civil servant and politician.

== Biography ==
=== Early life ===
Benney was born at Kaumati in the Hauraki district in 1902. He came from a family closely associated with mining, his father was the manager of the Golden Dawn Mining Company in Waihi, and his grandfather was also in charge of gold mines in Hauraki. He was educated at Komata School and then Thames High School winning a university scholarship. He married Phyllis Marjorie Jenkins in 1928 with whom he had one son, David, who went on to become a groundbreaking mathematician.

=== Public career ===
He joined the civil service in 1919 gaining employment at the Wellington offices of the Mines Department. In 1926 he finished his professional accountancy examinations at Wellington Technical College. In 1930 he left the Mines Department and joined the Ministry of Justice where he was appointed as an accountant until 1937 when he returned to the Mines Department also as an accountant. In 1940 he was appointed Under-secretary for Mines in succession to Arthur Tyndall, who had been appointed as a judge of the Arbitration Court. At 38 years of age, he was thought to have been the youngest person ever to hold the position of head of a department of state in New Zealand. He held the position until 1959 when he retired. In 1953, he was awarded the Queen Elizabeth II Coronation Medal. In the 1959 Birthday Honours he was made a member of the Imperial Service Order for his services to the civil service.

Benney was also involved in the Public Service Association (PSA). He was chairman of the Wellington section, a member of the executive (1938–39), and vice-president of the PSA (1939–40), and has also served on a large number of special committees in the public service. In 1955 he became President of the Civil Service Institute.

=== Political career ===
Benney was elected, on the Citizens' Association ticket, to the Wellington City Council in 1962 remaining a member until 1966 when he resigned citing a possible conflict of interests which may arise following his appointment as Executive Director of the Wellington Gas Company. Given his wealth of experience in the mining industry he was immediately appointed to the highly demanding role of chairman of the works committee, which he held throughout his tenure on the council.

He was involved in a public selection controversy in 1965, when he was chosen as the Citizens' nominee for the mayoralty by the association's executive (a position not normally considered for a first-term councillor). Despite initially accepting, Benney withdrew his nomination after it became clear to him that the majority of sitting Citizens' councillors instead favoured deputy mayor Denis McGrath. When Benney made clear his withdrawal, McGrath declined to stand for mayor, offering himself only for the council. As the deadline for nominations neared a deputation of over 50 businessmen and Citizens' candidates asked Benney to again accept both the nomination to which he agreed. Benney was officially nominated as the mayoral candidate, after which McGrath relented the role of deputy mayor to Benney as well.

At the election, Benney increased the Citizens' share of the vote and slightly decreased incumbent mayor Frank Kitts' majority, but was nonetheless defeated soundly. He was still elected to the council (polling higher than any other Citizens' candidate) and remained deputy mayor until his resignation from the council in 1966. The council decided to neither hold a by-election or make an appointment to fill Benney's vacated seat leaving the council with only 14 members for just over a year. He then became president of the Wellington Horticultural Society from 1966 to 1967.

=== Later life and death ===
Following the commencement of his employment with the Wellington Gas Company he was elected as chairman of the Gas Association of New Zealand from 1969 to 1970. In November 1966 Benney was appointed by the government as arbiter in a strike by tug boat engineers. He was later appointed by the government as chairman of a committee of inquiry into New Zealand's taxi and rental car industry.

Benney died 12 December 1980 in Wellington.

== Honorific eponym ==
The former coal mining town of Benneydale, located in the King Country, was jointly named after him in recognition of his services to the locality and mining industry.

== Notes ==
Political offices
Preceded by Denis McGrath	Deputy Mayor of Wellington; 1965–1966	Succeeded by Bob Archibald
