= 1965 Wellington mayoral election =

New Zealand local election

- 9 October 1965
- Turnout: 30,962 (47.6%)
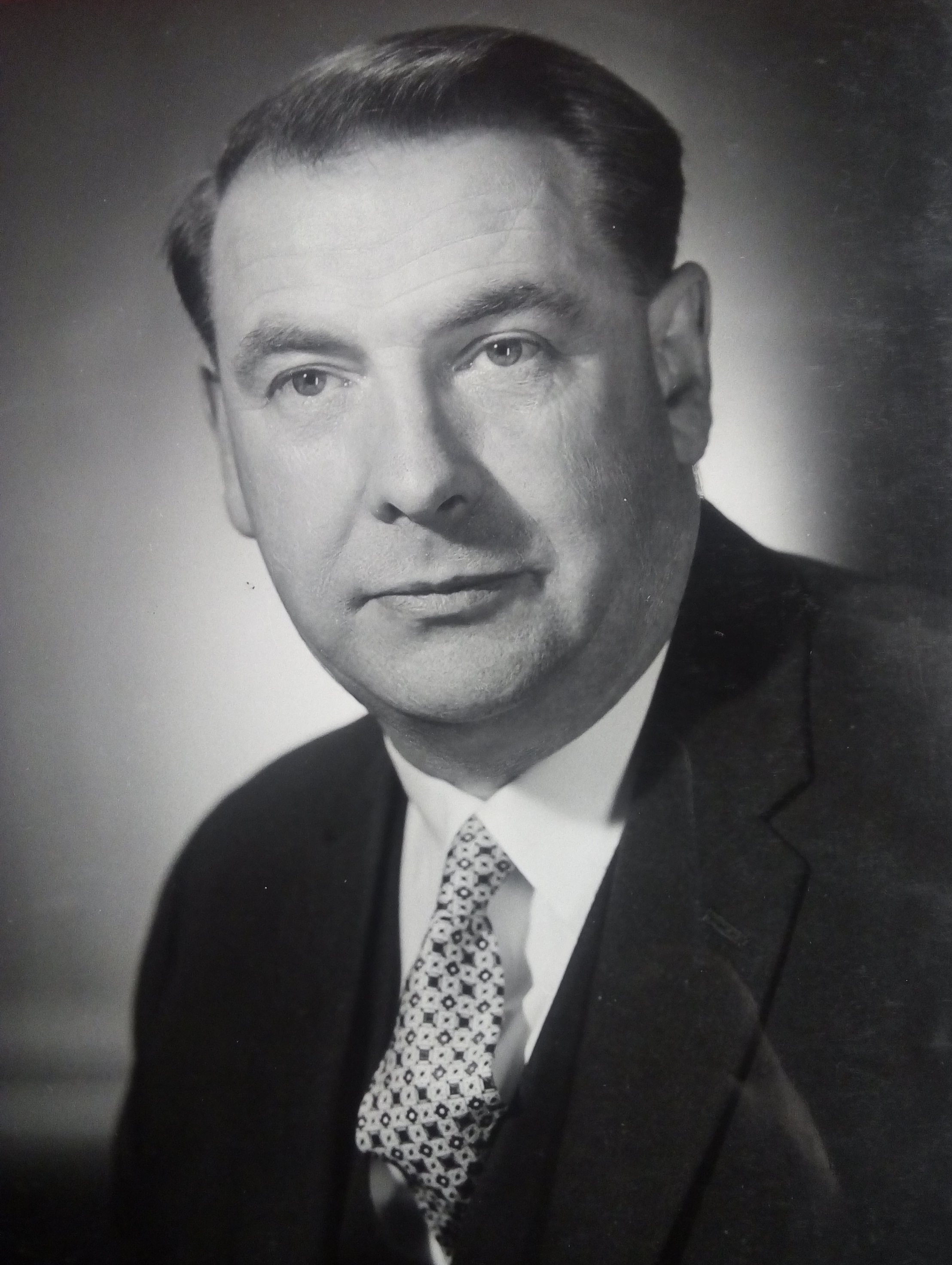

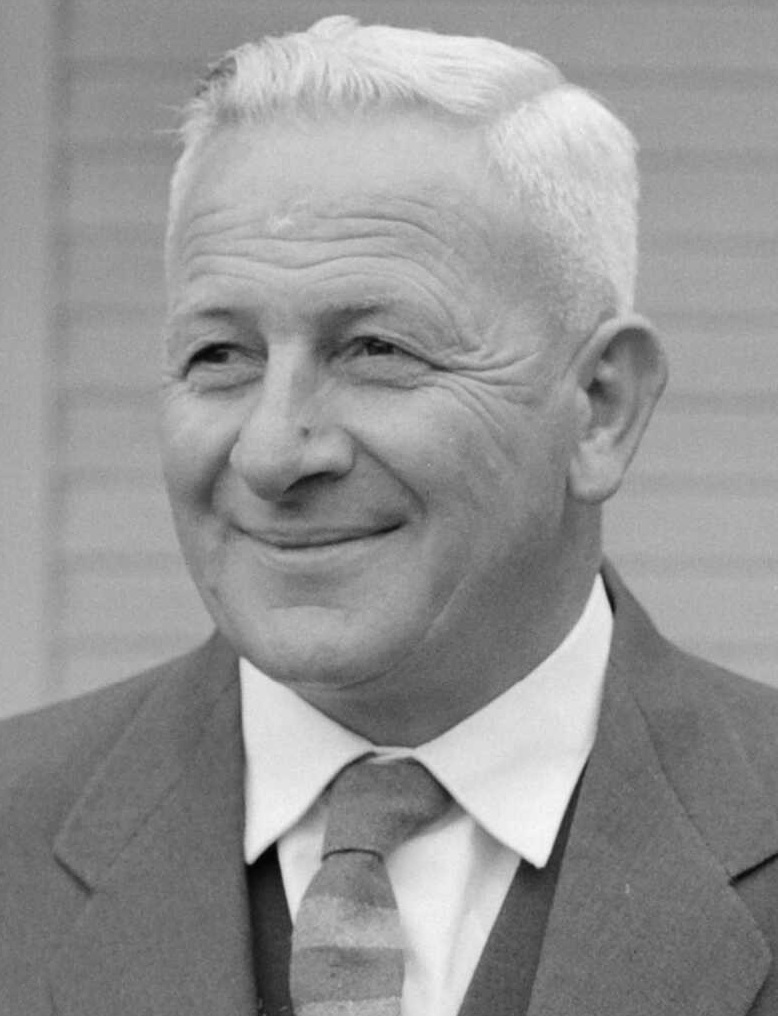
Candidate	Frank Kitts	Matt Benney
Party	Labour	Citizens'
Popular vote	17,783	11,966
Percentage	57.43	38.64
Mayor before election
Frank Kitts
Labour
Elected mayor
Frank Kitts
Labour

The 1965 Wellington mayoral election was part of the New Zealand local elections held that same year. In 1965, elections were held for the Mayor of Wellington plus other local government positions including fifteen city councillors. The polling was conducted using the standard first-past-the-post electoral method.

== Background ==
There was a rift within the Citizens' Association over their selected candidate for the mayoralty, Matt Benney. Benney was a first term councillor and formerly a reputable civil servant, serving as Under-secretary for Mines from 1940 until he retired in 1959. Benney was chosen as the Citizens' nominee for the mayoralty by the association's executive, but he withdrew his nomination after it became clear that a sizeable majority of sitting Citizens' councillors instead favoured deputy-mayor Denis McGrath. After Benney's declination, councillor Noel Manthel was then proposed as a compromise candidate, but he declined backing McGrath instead. However McGrath declined to stand for mayor and offered himself only for the council. As the deadline for nominations neared a deputation of over 50 businessmen and Citizens' candidates asked Benney to again accept both the nomination and deputy-mayoralty, to which he agreed.

Kitts attracted criticism for insisting on standing for the council as well as the mayoralty. He had done so in the previous five elections (winning the mayoralty in the last three) but with both his large majority in the previous election combined with the frictions within the Citizens' Association, Kitts was expected to win the mayoralty comfortably. Labour supporters thought he should make way for another candidate on the council ticket and reduce the number of wasted votes that would be caused on an inevitable dual election. The Labour Party duly won more votes than the Citizens' Association for the council, including over 18,000 for Kitts, though this only translated into one extra council seat, still leaving the council with a Citizens' majority.

== Mayoralty results ==
1965 Wellington mayoral election
Party	Candidate	Votes	%	±%
Labour	Frank Kitts	17,783	57.43	−3.75
Citizens'	Matt Benney	11,966	38.64	
United Action	Saul Goldsmith	1,031	3.32	–4.11
Informal votes		182	0.58	–0.07
Majority		5,817	18.78	–9.53
Turnout		30,962	47.6	+1.2

== Councillor results ==
1965 Wellington City Council election
Party	Candidate	Votes	%	±%
Labour	Frank Kitts (Note: As Kitts won the Mayoralty his election to the council was voided and his seat was awarded to the highest polling unsuccessful candidate.)	18,059	58.32	+3.33
Labour	Rolland O'Regan	16,729	54.03	
Citizens'	Matt Benney	16,606	53.63	+13.60
Labour	John Jeffries	15,678	50.63	+12.33
Labour	Olive Smuts-Kennedy	15,294	49.39	
Citizens'	Maida Clark	14,914	48.16	+4.06
Citizens'	Bob Archibald	14,332	46.28	+0.06
Citizens'	Alice Campbell	14,013	45.25	+1.24
Citizens'	Denis McGrath	13,991	45.18	+1.36
Citizens'	Stewart Duff	13,451	43.44	–0.44
Citizens'	George Porter	12,767	41.23	+3.10
Citizens'	John Turk	12,376	39.97	+0.20
Citizens'	Gordon Morrison	12,305	39.74	+2.09
Labour	Gerald O'Brien	12,257	39.58	+6.10
Citizens'	William Scollay	12,095	39.06	
Labour	Keith Spry	11,962	38.63	
Labour	Peter Butler	11,939	38.56	
Labour	Willis Livingstone Combs	11,458	37.00	
Labour	Percival Hansen	11,368	36.71	+6.55
Citizens'	Terry Dunleavy	11,202	36.17	
Citizens'	Roy Parsons	10,861	35.07	
Citizens'	Shirley Rowe	10,358	33.45	
Labour	Edward Hill	10,305	33.28	
Labour	Gwendrith Elsie Haine	10,209	32.97	
Labour	William Rose	10,050	32.45	
Citizens'	William Haydon	10,026	32.38	
Labour	Charles Troughton	9,761	31.52	
Labour	Roland Howell	9,677	31.25	+3.58
Labour	Alexander Schiff	9,399	30.35	
Citizens'	Oscar Bergh	8,700	28.09	
Independent	Max Wall	5,585	18.03	
United Action	Saul Goldsmith	4,548	14.68	–10.26
United Action	Frank Tickner	3,885	12.54	–6.28
United Action	Harold Fownes	2,802	9.04	
United Action	Ron Brierley	2,791	9.01	–2.84
United Action	Nancy Horrocks	2,710	8.75	
United Action	Peter Madden	2,691	8.69	
United Action	Alice Coe	2,625	8.47	–2.09
United Action	Lindsay Buick-Constable	2,557	8.25	
United Action	Oliver Goldsmith	2,421	7.81	
United Action	Nancy La Coste	2,323	7.50	
United Action	Barry Michael	2,014	6.50	
United Action	Carlyle Edwards	2,012	6.49	–2.42
United Action	Maurice de Woolf	1,947	6.28	
United Action	William Crowe	1,749	5.64	
Independent	William Rea	1,689	5.45	
United Action	William Woolhouse	1,610	5.19	
Independent	Philip Cossham	1,588	5.12	
United Action	Evan Collett	1,500	4.84	
United Action	Patrick Fee	1,342	4.33	–2.04
Communist	Ralph Gooderidge	1,068	3.44	
Communist	Ron Smith	1,017	3.28	–1.01

Table footnotes:
