= Kate Chilcott =

New Zealand cyclist

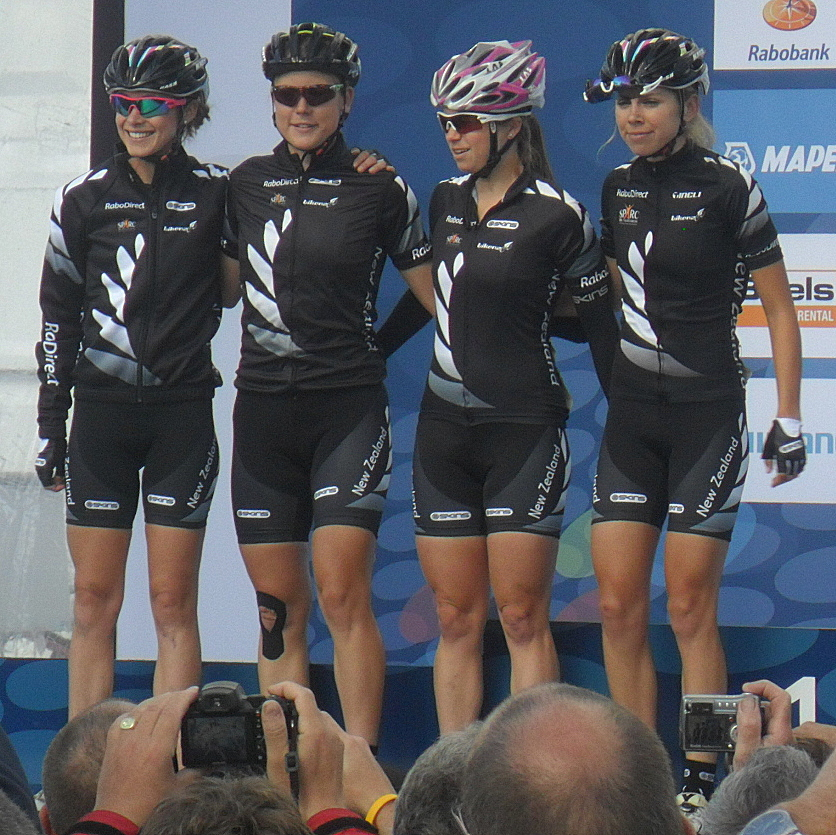
- Kate Chilcott at the 2012 UCI Road World Championships

Personal information
- Born: New Zealand

Cycling career
- Sport: Cycling
- Discipline: Road cycling

Kate Chilcott is a New Zealand road cyclist. She participated at the 2012 UCI Road World Championships.
