= Roy George Parsons =

New Zealand bookseller

Roy George Parsons (24 June 1909 – 25 October 1991) was a New Zealand bookseller. He was born in Gravesend, Kent, England in 1909.

In 1965, he unsuccessfully stood for the Wellington City Council on a Citizens' Association ticket.
