= Charlie Peek =

New Zealand teacher, child welfare administrator and billiards player

Charles Edward Peek (13 April 1904 – 21 December 1988) was a New Zealand teacher, child welfare administrator and billiards player. He was born in Picton, New Zealand, in 1904.

In 1953, Peek was awarded the Queen Elizabeth II Coronation Medal.
