= Francis O'Brien (cricketer) =

New Zealand cricketer

Personal information
- Full name: Francis Patrick O'Brien
- Born: 11 February 1911; Christchurch, Canterbury, New Zealand
- Died: 22 October 1991 (aged 80); Christchurch, Canterbury, New Zealand
- Batting: Right-handed
- Bowling: Right-arm medium-pace

Domestic team information
- Years: Team
- 1932–33 to 1945–46: Canterbury
- 1938 to 1939: Northamptonshire

Career statistics
Competition	First-class
Matches	66
Runs scored	2649
Batting average	24.52
100s/50s	4/10
Top score	164
Balls bowled	1160
Wickets	14
Bowling average	46.78
5 wickets in innings	0
10 wickets in match	0
Best bowling	2/14
Catches/stumpings	34/0
- Source: Cricinfo, 23 April 2020

Francis Patrick O'Brien (11 February 1911 – 22 October 1991) was a New Zealand cricketer who played first-class cricket for Canterbury from 1932 to 1946 and for Northamptonshire in 1938 and 1939.

A hard-hitting, tall and elegant middle-order batsman, O'Brien was one of three New Zealanders in the Northamptonshire team in 1938 and 1939, alongside Ken James and Bill Merritt, but he was unable to carry his New Zealand form into county cricket, scoring only 1306 runs in 40 matches. In 1940–41, when Canterbury needed to score 303 in 160 minutes to beat Otago, O'Brien made 101 and added 210 for the second wicket in 82 minutes with Walter Hadlee, and Canterbury won, scoring the required runs in 35 overs. In an innings victory over Otago in 1943-44 he scored 164 in four hours.
