= Joan Wood =

New Zealand educationalist and music teacher

Joan Myrtle Wood (11 January 1909 – 27 November 1990) was a New Zealand educationalist and music teacher. She was instrumental in establishing nursery playcentres in the early 1940s, which later developed into the present-day playcentre movement.

== Early life ==
Wood was born Joan Walter in South Weald, Essex, England on 11 January 1909. She grew up in England and South Africa and was Dux of Durban Girls' College in 1926. She then moved to Sydney and earned a Bachelor of Arts degree at the University of Sydney in 1926. She met and married Fred Wood while in Australia. Wood taught music at a girls' boarding school in Armidale, New South Wales for two years.

In 1935 her husband was appointed professor of history at Victoria University of Wellington and Joan, Fred and their son moved to Wellington. She became friendly with other women married to academic men who had given up their careers and together worked on projects such as the development of the playcentre movement.

== Public life ==
Wood, together with Beatrice Beeby and Inge Smithells, established nursery playcentres in Wellington, New Zealand in the early 1940s. The aim of the playcentres was to give mothers some relief from single parenting while their husbands were absent fighting in World War II. Two groups were initially established in Karori and Kelburne. On 22 July 1941 an inaugural meeting was held at Joan Wood's home and the thirteen women who attended agreed to establish a playcentre association. Beatrice Beeby was elected first President, Joan Wood Recording Secretary and Inge Smithells Organising Secretary. All three women were anxious to be independent, however they were still able to benefit from the connections of their husbands (all three were married to influential men in the education field).

The original two centres established in 1941 were still in operation in 2015.

Parent education was needed to help the fledgling organisation thrive, and Wood continued her own education, graduating with a Diploma of Education in 1942. She also lectured on child development at the Wellington WEA.

In the 1950s Wood returned to music and studied singing in Paris and London, returning to Wellington to teach singing to private students and at Victoria University.
