= William Robert Murray =

New Zealand labourer, policeman and unionist

William Robert Murray (25 April 1896–31 March 1990) was a notable New Zealand labourer, policeman and unionist. He was born in Kirkby Stephen, Westmorland, England on 25 April 1896.
