= Paratene McLeod =

New Zealand basketball player

Personal information
- Born: 6 April 1991 (age 35) Tauranga, New Zealand
- Listed height: 190 cm (6 ft 3 in)
- Listed weight: 97 kg (214 lb)

Career information
- High school: Southland Boys' (Invercargill, New Zealand)
- Playing career: 2010–present
- Position: Shooting guard / point guard

Career history
- 2010–2013: Southland Sharks

Career highlights
- NBL champion (2013)

Paratene McLeod (born 6 April 1991) is a New Zealand basketball player.

== Early life ==
Born in Tauranga, McLeod and raised in Invercargill, where he attended Southland Boys' High School. While attending Southland Boys', he competed with the New Zealand under-16 and under-18 sides, and in 2009, he was invited to trial for the Junior Tall Blacks, but withdrew because of a knee injury.

== Professional career ==
In January 2010, McLeod signed with the newly-established Southland Sharks for the 2010 NBL season. In August 2010, he re-signed with the Sharks for the 2011 season. He continued on with the Sharks in 2012 and 2013. He was a member of the Sharks' 2013 championship-winning squad.

In December 2017, McLeod was named in a 14-man local Southland Sharks pre-season training squad ahead of the 2018 NBL season.
