= Claire Garrood =

New Zealand cricketer (born 1988)

Claire Frances Garrood (born 15 February 1988 in Rotorua) is a New Zealand cricketer who played three matches for the Northern Districts Spirit in the State League in 2002–03.
