= Finn Lowery =

New Zealand water polo player

Personal information
- Full name: Finn Henry Mrkusic Lowery
- Born: 1 October 1990 Auckland, New Zealand
- Died: 24 March 2019 (aged 28) Auckland, New Zealand
- Height: 1.85 m (6 ft 1 in)
- Weight: 85 kg (187 lb)

Sport
- Country: New Zealand
- Sport: Water polo
- Club: North Harbour Water Polo Club

Finn Henry Mrkusic Lowery (1 October 1990 – 24 March 2019) was a New Zealand lawyer, Rhodes Scholar, and water polo player who was a member of the New Zealand men's national water polo team at the 2013 World Aquatics Championships.

Born in Auckland, on 1 October 1990, Lowery was the son of Martin and Anna Lowery. He was educated at Rangitoto College where he was head boy in 2008. After leaving high school, he played water polo for a club in Madrid, Spain, before returning to the University of Auckland to study law, French, and political philosophy. Upon completion of his law degree, Lowery was awarded the Auckland District Law Society Prize for graduating top of his class. In 2014, Lowery was awarded a Rhodes Scholarship, which allowed him to complete a master's degree in Latin American studies, economics, sociology, and politics at the University of Oxford.

Lowery made his debut for the New Zealand national men's water polo team in 2010, and made 19 international appearances for New Zealand. In 2013, he played for New Zealand in the FINA World League Asia-Oceania section in May, and then at the World Championships in Barcelona later that year. The following year, he again represented New Zealand at the Commonwealth Water Polo Championships in Aberdeen, where the New Zealand team finished in fifth place.

Lowery died in Auckland on 24 March 2019 after a long battle with depression.
