= Monica Beatrice McKenzie =

New Zealand teacher, dietitian and public servant

Monica Beatrice McKenzie (23 October 1905 – 5 December 1988) was a New Zealand teacher, dietitian and public servant. She was born in Wellington, Wellington, New Zealand on 23 October 1905.
