= Charlie Jackman =

New Zealand cricketer (1906–1988)

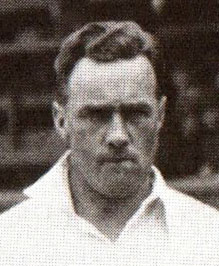
- Jackman during the 1935–36 season

Personal information
- Full name: Charles Keith Quentin Jackman
- Born: 4 February 1906; Christchurch, New Zealand
- Died: 23 February 1988 (aged 82); Auckland, New Zealand
- Batting: Left-handed
- Role: Wicket-keeper

Domestic team information
- Years: Team
- 1934/35–1936/37: Canterbury
- 1937/38–1940/41: Auckland

Career statistics
Competition	First-class
Matches	16
Runs scored	95
Batting average	5.58
100s/50s	0/0
Top score	17
Catches/stumpings	20/27
- Source: Cricinfo, 23 October 2014

Charles Keith Quentin Jackman (4 February 1906 – 23 February 1988) was a cricketer who played first-class cricket for Canterbury and Auckland between 1935 and 1942 and represented New Zealand in 1935–36.

A wicket-keeper, known for his "uncanny speed in effecting stumpings", Jackman made his first-class debut for South Island against North Island in 1934–35, making one catch and four stumpings. The next season, playing in the Plunket Shield for Canterbury against Wellington, he set a New Zealand record when he made seven stumpings in the match, six of them off the leg-spin of Bill Merritt. The record still stood in 2021. Later in 1935–36 he was selected for two of the four matches New Zealand played against the touring MCC.

Jackman was educated at Christ's College, Christchurch, and Canterbury College, where he graduated with a Bachelor of Laws degree in 1928. He was admitted as a barrister and solicitor in December 1928. He then studied accountancy in Christchurch, and qualified as an accountant in early 1933. He married Cecil Vivian Addison McConnell in Auckland in September 1937.
