= Karl Filiga =

New Zealand rugby league footballer

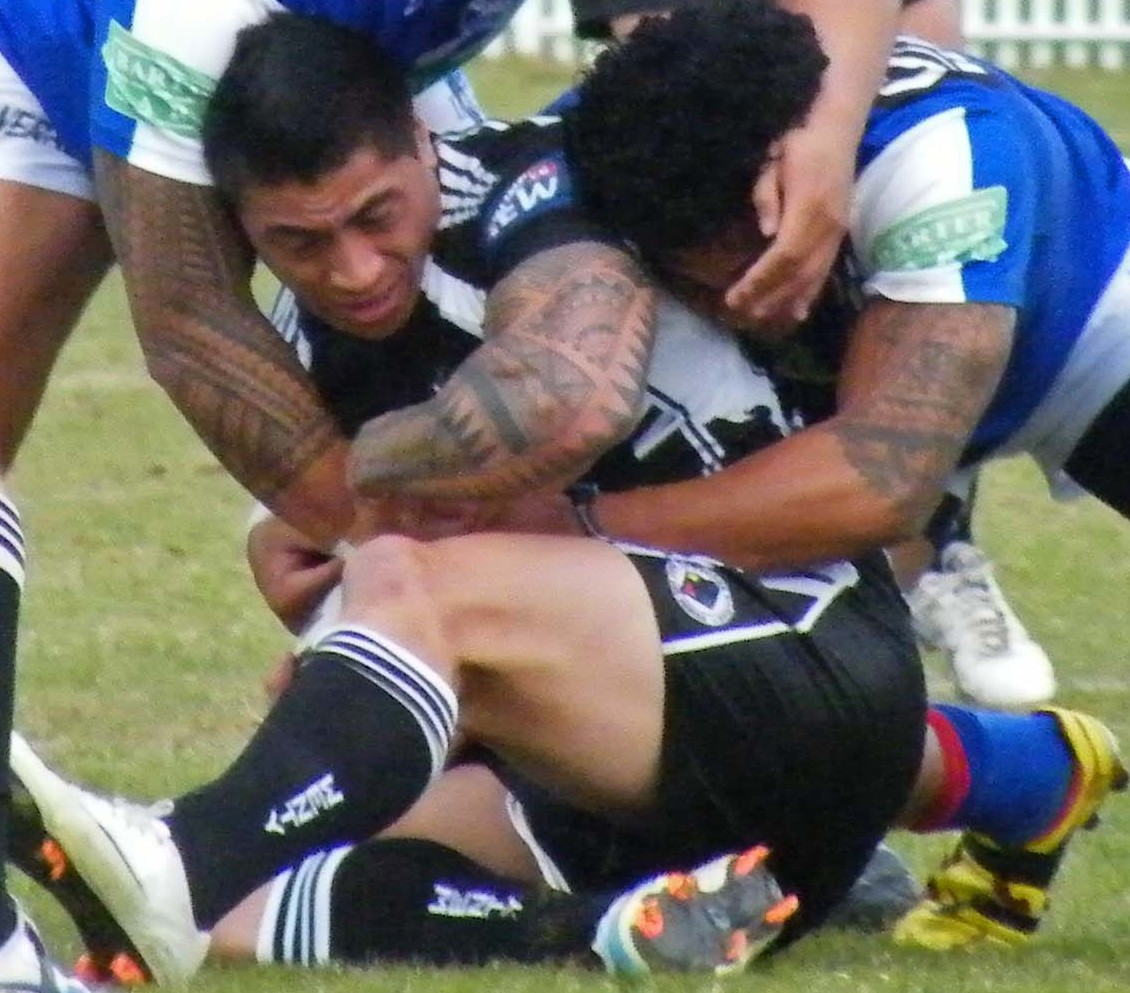

Personal information
- Full name: Karlos Filiga
- Born: Karlos McNichol; 16 October 1988 (age 38) Wellington, New Zealand
- Height: 188 cm (6 ft 2 in)
- Weight: 105 kg (16 st 7 lb)

Playing information
- Position: Centre
Club
Years	Team	Pld	T	G	FG	P
2008	Cronulla Sharks	1	0	0	0	0
- Source: As of 27 January 2021

Karlos Filiga (né McNichol; born 16 October 1988 in Wellington, New Zealand) is a former professional rugby league footballer who played for Cronulla-Sutherland in the National Rugby League (NRL) competition. Filiga primarily played at centre or in second-row. As of 2024, he is a Personal Trainer in Cooma.

== Early life ==
Filiga was born in New Zealand. His father is Australian and his mother is Samoan. Filiga changed his last name from McNichol to his mother's maiden name of Filiga.

== Playing career ==
In 2007, Filiga was labelled by his manager as "the next Sonny Bill Williams".

Cronulla won a bidding war in late 2007 for Filiga, committing to a A$600,000 contract over three years. Filiga, previously a Bulldogs junior playing for the Chester Hill Hornets, didn't make his debut in first-grade in 2007 as he spent most of the season sidelined with chest and foot injuries.

In 2008, the first year of his three-year Cronulla contract, Filiga's NRL appearances were limited by his form. He spent only 11 minutes on the field in the NRL, playing off the bench in a match against Penrith in round 13.

Cronulla Sharks released Filiga on "compassionate grounds" in April 2009. It is estimated that Filiga's 11-minute NRL career cost Cronulla A$20,000 per minute.

Filiga then went to play for the Wentworthville Magpies, who are the feeder club for the Parramatta Eels NRL Side.

As of 2017, Filiga plays for The Cooma Stallions.
