= Elias Scheres =

New Zealand netball player

Personal information
- Full name: Elias Scheres (Née: Shadrock)
- Born: 2 July 1990 (age 36) Tokoroa, New Zealand
- Height: 1.78 m (5 ft 10 in)
- Spouse: (m. 2016)
- School: Western Heights High School
- University: Waikato University

Netball career
- Playing positions: WA, C, WD
Years	Club team	Apps
2009–2010	Waikato Bay of Plenty Magic	
2012–2016	Central Pulse	
- Updated on 2016-02-26

Elias Scheres (née Shadrock; born 2 July 1990 in Tokoroa, New Zealand) is a former New Zealand netball player who last played in the ANZ Championship in 2016, playing for the Central Pulse. Scheres captained the New Zealand Secondary Schools team that won the International School Girls Championship in June 2008. She was also a member of the New Zealand U21 team in 2007 and 2008, and made the preliminary U21 squad in 2009.
