= Owen Ivins =

New Zealand cricketer (born 1991)

Owen Gilbert Ivins (born 19 September 1991 in Vereeniging, South Africa) is a New Zealand cricketer who plays for the Northern Districts Knights in the Plunket Shield.
