= Kenny Ardouin =

New Zealand community activist

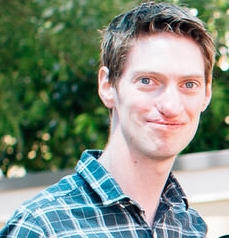
- Ardouin, December 2015.
- Born: 7 May 1991 (age 35); Hastings, United Kingdom
- Occupations: Radio Journalist & Presenter, Speech Language Therapist
- Years active: 2005–present
- Known for: Local current affairs radio journalist in Christchurch, advocate for those affected by cleft lip and palate.
- Board member of: Linwood College (2006–2009), Cleft New Zealand (2011–2015)

Kenneth Michael "Kenny" Ardouin (born 7 May 1991) is known for his role in supporting those affected in New Zealand, the United Kingdom and around the world, by cleft lip and palate. He is also known as a radio journalist and presenter in Christchurch, New Zealand.

== See also ==
- Cleft lip and palate
- Plains FM
- Volcano Radio 88.5FM Lyttelton
