= Francis Ward (rugby union) =

- Born: Francis Gerald Ward; 17 March 1900 Wellington, New Zealand
- Died: 11 March 1990 (aged 89) Palmerston North, New Zealand
- School: Wellington College
- University: Otago University
- Occupation: Medical Practitioner

Rugby union career
- Position: Wing Three-quarter
Amateur team(s)
Years	Team	Apps	(Points)
1920—21	University		
Provincial / State sides
Years	Team	Apps	(Points)
1920—21	Otago	14	(0)
International career
Years	Team	Apps	(Points)
1921	New Zealand	1	(0)

Francis Gerald Ward (17 March 1900 – 11 March 1990) was a New Zealand rugby union player who represented the All Blacks in 1921. His position of choice was wing three-quarter.

Born in Wellington in 1900, Ward was educated at Wellington College where he was a member of the 1st XV between 1917 and 1918. He died in Palmerston North in 1990, and was buried at Kelvin Grove Cemetery.

== Career ==
After graduating from secondary school Ward moved south and attended Otago University. In 1920 Ward was trialled to play at the Half-back position for his Otago Varsity team, but it was decided the position did not suit him. An unknown commentator stated: "Ward is a brilliant individualist, a straight runner and fast. He should be played as a Wing Three-quarter". This opinion would come true as Ward was selected on the wing for the All Blacks against the touring New South Wales side in Christchurch in 1921, making his debut at 21 years of age. He scored no points in this appearance.

Unfortunately for Ward his Rugby career took a turn for the worse because of a serious knee injury suffered in 1922, which ultimately ended his career.

== Personal ==
Ward was one of three children of William Frederick Ward and Kate Gardiner McRae.

He worked as a medical practitioner in Palmerston North.
