= Shane Pumipi =

New Zealand rugby league footballer

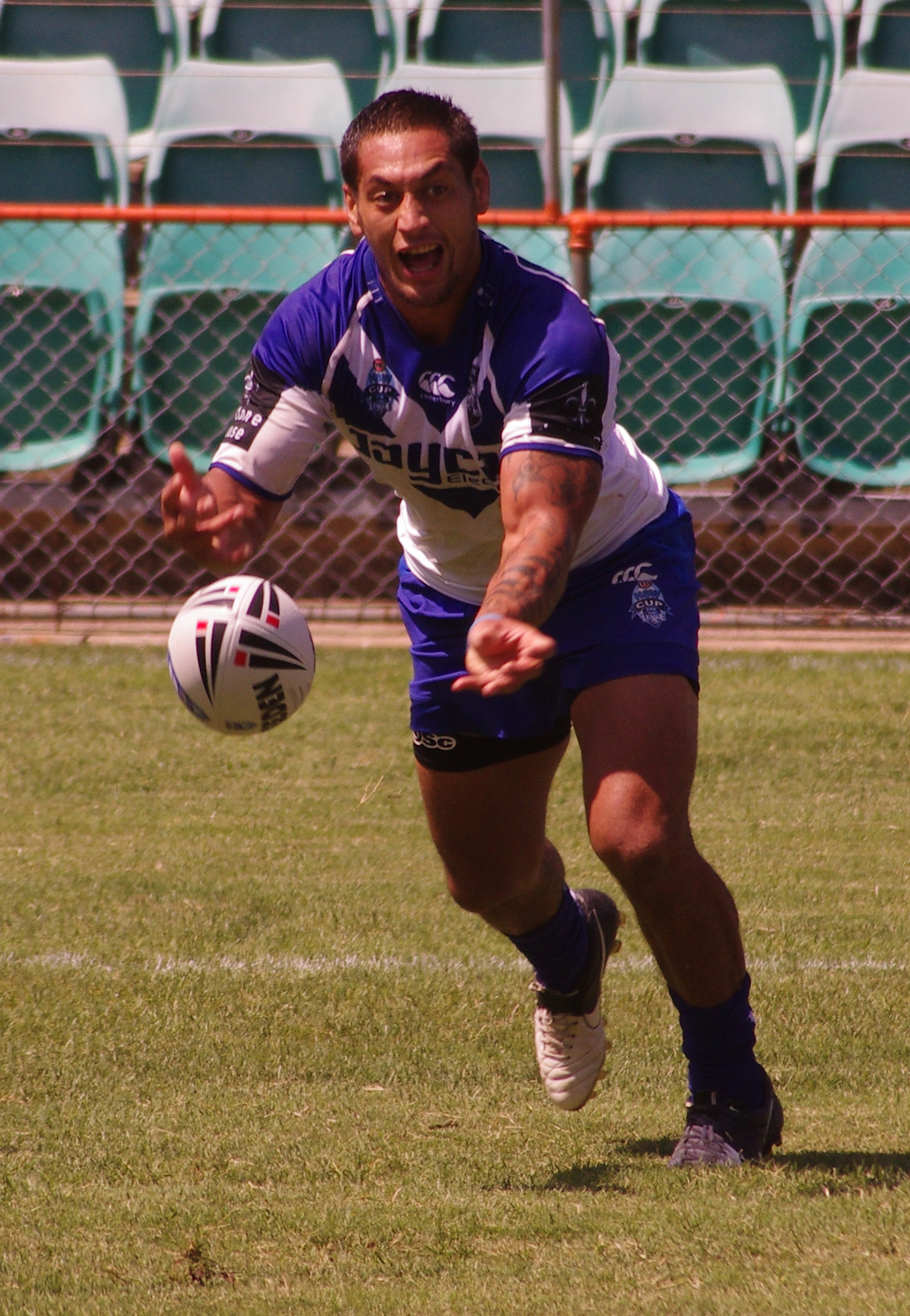
- Pumipi playing for the Bulldogs in 2013.

Personal information
- Born: 13 April 1990 (age 36) Dargaville, New Zealand
- Height: 181 cm (5 ft 11 in)
- Weight: 91 kg (14 st 5 lb)

Playing information
- Position: Hooker, Five-eighth
Club
Years	Team	Pld	T	G	FG	P
2014	St. George Illawarra	8	0	0	0	0
- Source: As of 16 November 2023

Shane Pumipi (born 13 April 1990) is a New Zealand professional rugby league footballer who last played for the Redcliffe Dolphins in the Queensland Cup. He previously played for the St. George Illawarra Dragons in the National Rugby League. He primarily plays hooker and five-eighth.

== Background ==
Born in Dargaville, New Zealand, Pumipi played his junior football for Northland Rugby Union before switching to rugby league and playing for the Northcote Tigers. He was then signed by the Cronulla-Sutherland Sharks. In 2006, Pumipi played for the Junior Kiwis Under-16s team.

== Playing career ==
In 2008 and 2009, Pumipi played for the Cronulla-Sutherland Sharks' NYC team before joining the Canterbury-Bankstown Bulldogs mid-season in 2009 and playing on into 2010.

In 2011, Pumipi played for Bankstown Sports in the Bundaberg Cup before moving on to the Canterbury-Bankstown Bulldogs New South Wales Cup team mid-season.

In 2012, Pumipi played for the New South Wales Residents team.

In 2013, Pumipi joined the Illawarra Cutters, the New South Wales Cup team of the St. George Illawarra Dragons, before gaining a contract with the first grade team.

In round 12 of the 2014 NRL season, Pumipi made his NRL debut for St. George Illawarra against the South Sydney Rabbitohs after his former New South Wales Cup coach from 2013, Paul McGregor was promoted to NRL coach following the sacking of Steve Price.

On 29 October 2014, Pumipi was released by St. George Illawarra. In 2016, Pumipi joined Queensland Cup side Redcliffe. He played for Redcliffe in their 2016 Queensland Cup grand final loss.
