= Frank Hutchison (cricketer) =

New Zealand cricketer

Personal information
- Full name: Frank Copland Hutchison
- Born: 25 January 1897; Dunedin, Otago, New Zealand
- Died: 17 December 1990 (aged 93); Wanganui, New Zealand

Domestic team information
- Years: Team
- 1917/18–1919/20: Otago
- 1923/24–1927/28: Wanganui
- Source: ESPNcricinfo, 14 May 2016

Frank Copland Hutchison (25 January 1897 – 17 December 1990) was a New Zealand sportsman. He played six first-class cricket matches for Otago, three in each of the 1917–18 and 1919–20 seasons.

Hutchison was born at Dunedin in 1897 and educated at Otago Boys' High School in the city. He made his first-class debut for Otago in a December 1917 match against Canterbury at the Hagley Oval in Christchurch before playing in both of Otago's other first-class matches during the season. His other three first-class appearances came in Otago's first three representative matches in the 1919–20 season. Playing as a batsman, Hutchison scored a total of 144 runs with a highest score of 85, his only first-class half-century.

A medical doctor by profession, Hutchison played Hawke Cup cricket for Wanganui from the 1923–24 season to 1927–28. As well as cricket he played representative rugby union for Otago and Wellington and golf for Taranaki, Wanganui and Manawatu. He was the national veterans golf champion.

Hutchison died at Wanganui in 1990. He was aged 93.
