= John Cameron (New Zealand cricketer) =

New Zealand cricketer

Personal information
- Full name: John Nevis Allan Cameron
- Born: 26 September 1898; Dunedin, New Zealand
- Died: 16 December 1988 (aged 90); Nelson, New Zealand

Domestic team information
- Years: Team
- 1917/18: Otago
- Source: ESPNcricinfo, 6 May 2016

John Nevis Allan Cameron (26 September 1898 – 16 December 1988) was a New Zealand cricketer. He played one first-class match for Otago during the 1917–18 season, a wartime fixture against Southland played in March 1918. He scored three runs in the only innings in which he batted.

Cameron was born at Dunedin in 1898 and educated at Dunedin Normal School. He died in 1988 at Nelson aged 90.
