= Edward Purcell (rugby league) =

Samoa international rugby league player

Personal information
- Born: 30 November 1988 (age 36); New Zealand

Playing information
- Position: Prop, Second-row
Representative
| Years | Team | Pld | T | G | FG | P |
|---|---|---|---|---|---|---|
| 2013 | Samoa |

Edward Purcell is a professional rugby league footballer who represented Samoa in the 2013 World Cup.

== Playing career ==
Purcell played for the Auckland Lions in the 2007 Bartercard Cup grand final winning side.

In 2008 he played 31 games for the New Zealand Warriors side in the Toyota Cup.

He played for the Akarana Falcons in the 2013 National Competition, and was then selected by Samoa for the World Cup.
