= Arthur Fairchild Pearce =

New Zealand jazz musician (1903–1990)

Arthur Fairchild Pearce (18 December 1903 – 6 March 1990) was a New Zealand clerk, jazz specialist, broadcaster and pianist. He was born in Wellington, New Zealand in 1903.
