= Stella Jones (writer) =

New Zealand playwright and writer (1904–1991)

- Born: Stella Marjorie Claridge; 5 April 1904; Kimbolton, New Zealand
- Died: 6 June 1991 (aged 87); New Zealand
- Occupation: Playwright
- Notable work: The Tree (1957)

Stella Marjorie Jones (née Claridge, 5 April 1904 – 6 June 1991) was a New Zealand playwright and writer.

== Biography ==
Jones was born in Kimbolton, near Feilding, New Zealand. She had six sisters and two brothers and her parents were Louise Mary Claridge (née Taylor) and James Henry Claridge. She grew up in a variety of small towns around the country, as her father was a newspaper editor and worked on a number of regional and small-town papers. In 1931, she married Arthur Thomas Jones.

Jones began her career writing short stories and articles which were published in the literary journal Landfall. However, she is best known for writing the successful play The Tree (1957), the story of ageing parents and their three daughters, one of whom returns to the family home after a 15-year absence. Jones had submitted the play to the 1956 Southland Provincial Centennial competition for an unpublished play, winning second place. Nevertheless, the play was rejected by a number of New Zealand theatres. It was purchased by a London agent, and it had its professional debut in Bristol, England. After success in England, the New Zealand Players, who had previously rejected it, toured the country with the play. The play was one of the first New Zealand plays to reach a wide audience, and was praised by critics. The New Zealand Herald newspaper wrote that it was a "compelling and first-class piece of work".

Later in her career Jones wrote radio plays, including the acclaimed Between Seasons (1965) and Julia's Day (1972). She also published two papers in the Auckland-Waikato Historical Journal in 1979 and 1980, analysing her father's contributions to the development of newspapers in New Zealand.
