= Beatrice Beeby =

New Zealand educator (1903–1991)

- Born: Beatrice Eleanor Newnham; 1903; New Zealand
- Died: 20 December 1991 (aged 87–88); Lower Hutt, New Zealand
- Occupation: Educator
- Spouse: Clarence Beeby (m. 1926)
- Children: Christopher

Beatrice Eleanor Beeby (née Newnham; 1903 – 20 December 1991) was a New Zealand educator. She was key figure in the establishment of the nursery playcentre movement in New Zealand, which developed into the present-day Playcentre organisation.

== Early years ==
Beeby was born Beatrice Eleanor Newnham. Her father was a newspaper editor in Timaru, and her mother a schoolteacher.

She met Clarence Beeby while they were students at Christchurch Teachers' Training College. Beeby and Clarence were interested in drama and were foundation members of the Canterbury University College Drama Club. Beeby acted in and directed the drama club's productions. Beeby and Clarence studied Education under James Shelley, a newly arrived lecturer from England, and his ideas influenced them.

Beeby passed her teaching examination in 1922 and graduated with a Bachelor of Arts degree from Canterbury College in 1924. Beeby and Clarence were engaged that year, and Clarence moved to Manchester, England to study his doctoral degree. Beatrice did some teaching in Christchurch and followed later on, and they married in Manchester on 3 June 1926. Beeby worked as a teacher of special needs students until she became pregnant and returned to New Zealand. Their first child, Helen, was born in 1927 in Christchurch, six weeks after Clarence returned from England.

While raising her young family in Christchurch, Beeby continued her interest in drama and joined the Canterbury Repertory Theatre Society, which Shelley had founded in 1928. She directed and appeared in plays the group produced.

In 1932, Clarence and Beeby, together with some of Clarence's university students, set up a free play centre five mornings a week, with the goal of observing the behaviour of 5-year-old children for Clarence's research.

In 1934, the family moved to Wellington, where they settled in Karori. Clarence took up a new position at NZCER, the New Zealand Council for Educational Research.

Their second child, Christopher, was born in 1935.

== Public life ==
With Joan Wood and Inge Smithells, Beeby established the first nursery playcentres in the early 1940s, precursor to the present-day Playcentre organisation. The aim of the playcentres was to give mothers some relief from single parenting while their husbands were absent fighting in World War II. Two groups were initially established in Karori and Kelburn. On 22 July 1941 the inaugural meeting was held at Wood's home, and the thirteen women who attended agreed to establish a playcentre association. Beeby was elected first President, Wood Recording Secretary and Smithells Organising Secretary. All three women were anxious to be independent but benefited from the connections of their husbands, who were influential in the education field. Clarence, for example, printed the group's pamphlets free of charge at his office. Beeby's knowledge of the funding system also enabled her to successfully apply for a grant from the New Education Fellowship in 1937, and she attended their conference in 1944 as a representative of the nursery playcentre organisation.

The ideas of the nursery playcentre proved popular, and by December 1946 playcentres operated in Auckland, Christchurch and Palmerston North. The New Zealand Nursery Play Centre Federation had its first meeting in May 1948.

Beeby's life from the 1950s involved accompanying her husband on his international career as a diplomat to France and an educational consultant in the United States and Indonesia. After returning to Wellington, Beeby fell ill and required hospital care for many years. She died in Hutt Hospital on 20 December 1991 of pneumonia.
