= Freda Ellen Barnes =

New Zealand law clerk and political activist

Freda Ellen "Fuzz" Barnes JP (12 August 1902 – 17 February 1991) was a New Zealand law clerk and political activist. She was born in Lyttelton, New Zealand on 12 August 1902.
