= Freda Mary Cook =

New Zealand activist and teacher (1896–1990)

Freda Mary Cook (9 November 1896–20 January 1990) was a New Zealand community worker, socialist, feminist, peace activist, social reformer and teacher. She was born in Alvescot, Oxfordshire, England on 9 November 1896.
