= Anthony Rohrs =

New Zealand cricketer

Anthony John Rohrs (5 August 1961 – 24 June 1988), was a New Zealand cricketer.

Rohrs was born in Lower Hutt. He played two first-class matches for the Wellington Firebirds in 1988 before his death in Wellington in a road accident at the age of 26. He also played for Hutt Valley in the Hawke Cup.
