= Robert Alexander (New Zealand cricketer) =

New Zealand cricketer

Robert Edward Alexander (September 1911, in Christchurch – 9 May 1988, in Christchurch) was a New Zealand cricket player who appeared in only one first-class match, for Canterbury in the 1933–34 season.
