= Jamie Love (softball) =

New Zealand softball player

Jamie Love (born 1990) is a New Zealand representative softball player

== Early life ==
Love originates from Whangara, near Gisborne. Later, he spent his childhood in Auckland and received his secondary education at St Peter's College which he attended in the years 2001–2007.

== Softball ==
Love played softball from the age of four and progressed through the ranks to reach national team level. His first team was for the under-sixes. His first Auckland representative team was at the age of 11. Love captained each of the Auckland representative teams he played for. He was then selected for national teams. He played for the under-19 team in test series against Australia in 2006 and 2007, being named most valuable player in 2006. He was the Captain of the Junior Black Sox Softball Team in 2008 He ordinarily plays for the Hutt Valley team as a pitcher/outfielder.
