= Herbert David Mullon =

Herbert David Mullon (1 February 1905 – 17 September 1991) was a notable New Zealand postal worker, broadcaster, philatelist and historian. He was born in Marton, Wanganui, New Zealand on 1 February 1905.
