= Ngata Pitcaithly =

Ngata Prosser Pitcaithly (26 September 1906 – 28 April 1991) was a New Zealand principal and educationalist. He was born in Waimate, New Zealand, in 1906. Not of Māori ancestry, his Australian-born mother liked Māori names and all the children were given one. Pitcaithly did develop an interest in Māori culture and made outstanding contributions to Māori education.

In 1953, Pitcaithly was awarded the Queen Elizabeth II Coronation Medal.

Pitcaithly died in Auckland in 1991.
