= Tamati Clarke =

New Zealand cricketer (born 1990)

Personal information
- Born: 12 February 1990 (age 36); Auckland, New Zealand
- Source: ESPNcricinfo, 28 September 2016

Tamati Clarke (born 12 February 1990) is a New Zealand cricketer. He made two List A appearances for Northern Districts in 2013. He was part of New Zealand's squad for the 2008 Under-19 Cricket World Cup.
