= Greg Lemin =

Australian cricketer

Personal information
- Full name: Gregory William Lemin
- Born: 20 December 1968 (age 57); Herston, Queensland, Australia
- Batting: Right-handed
- Bowling: Right-arm medium

Domestic team information
- Years: Team
- 1997/98–1998/99: ACT Comets

Career statistics
Competition	List A
Matches	6
Runs scored	55
Batting average	9.16
100s/50s	0/0
Top score	22
Balls bowled	168
Wickets	4
Bowling average	39.00
5 wickets in innings	0
10 wickets in match	0
Best bowling	2/14
Catches/stumpings	1/–
- Source: CricketArchive, 29 August 2020

Gregory William Lemin (born 20 December 1968) is a former cricketer who played List A cricket for the ACT Comets in the Mercantile Mutual Cup.

== Biography ==
Lemin was born in Brisbane and played his club cricket in Canberra with Tuggeranong, in the same side as Michael Bevan.

He won the ACTCA player of the year award, the D B Robin Medal, in the 1993/94 season.

The ACT Comets made their debut in Australia's limited-overs tournament in the 1997-98 season. Lemin played in the opening match against South Australia at Manuka Oval and took two wickets for 14 from his four overs, which remained a career best in List A cricket. His other two wickets that season were both noted cricketers, the first was Ricky Ponting at Bellerive Oval, who he dismissed for 22. He also took the penultimate wicket in the ACT's first win in the tournament, bowling Brad Hodge, who was Victoria's last recognised batsman. He featured in a total of six List A matches, five that season, then one more in 1998-99.

Still living in Canberra, Lemin works in the construction industry.
