= Joel Faulkner =

- Born: Joel Faulkner; 5 May 1991 (age 35) Auckland, New Zealand
- Height: 1.92 m (6 ft 3 1/2 in)
- Weight: 90 kg (14 st 2 lb)

Rugby union career
- Position: Fullback / Centre / Wing
- Current team: Easts
Super Rugby
Years	Team	Apps	(Points)
2014–	Reds	0	(0)
- Correct as of 31 October 2012
International career
Years	Team	Apps	(Points)
2011	Australia u20		

Joel Faulkner (born 5 May 1991 in Auckland, New Zealand) is a rugby union footballer who plays as a utility back.

He has been named in the Reds Extended Playing Squad for the 2013 Super Rugby season on the back of his performances for his local club Easts. Faulkner represented Australia under 20 in the 2011 IRB Junior World Championship in Italy.
