= George Lemin =

New Zealand cricketer (1905–1988)

Personal information
- Full name: Thomaas George Frederick Lemin
- Born: 5 November 1905; Zeehan, Tasmania, Australia
- Died: 29 November 1988 (aged 83); Dunedin, Otago, New Zealand
- Batting: Right-handed
- Bowling: Right-arm medium

Domestic team information
- Years: Team
- 1929/30–1939/40: Otago
- FC debut: 31 January 1930 Otago v Wellington
- Last FC: 1 April 1943 RNZAF v NZ Army

Career statistics
Competition	First-class
Matches	9
Runs scored	64
Batting average	7.11
100s/50s	0/0
Top score	11
Balls bowled	1,693
Wickets	29
Bowling average	28.20
5 wickets in innings	2
10 wickets in match	0
Best bowling	5/21
Catches/stumpings	2/–
- Source: ESPNcricinfo, 15 May 2016

Thomas George Frederick Lemin (5 November 1905 – 29 November 1988) was a New Zealand cricketer. He played nine first-class matches, eight of which were for Otago between the 1929–30 and 1939–40 seasons.

Lemin was born at Zeehan in Tasmania in 1905. Primarily a bowler, he played club cricket for the Grange club in Dunedin where he developed a reputation as a medium-paced bowler who bowled with control and good length. He employed "late swing and extra quickness off the wicket" effectively and had a "compact action". He made his first-class debut for Otago against Wellington in a Plunket Shield match in January 1930, taking four wickets in the first innings of the match. He played for the representative side in the next match of the 1929–30 season and in two of Otago's three matches the following season, but did not appear again in provincial cricket until the 1938–39 season, although in 1934 he was described as "the well-known Grange Club bowler".

Although he only played onc wicketless representative match during 1938–40, Lemin played in all three of Otago's matches during the following season. He took 14 wickets, including five for the cost of 96 runs (5/96) against Cantebrury in the first representative match of the season and 5/21 against Wellington in the last. These were Lemin's only two five-wicket hauls during his first-class career. He came close to leading the New Zealand bowling averages during the season and was awarded the Wycherley Trophy as Otago's best bowler of 1939–40.

During World War II Lemin served in the Royal New Zealand Air Force (RNZAF). He played some services cricket during the war, including taking five wickets in the final first-class match of his career, an April 1943 fixture between the RNZAF against the New Zealand Army.

Lemin died after a car accident at Dunedin in 1988. He was aged 83. An obituary was published in the 1990 edition of the New Zealand Cricket Almanack.
