= 1989 in New Zealand =

- Decades: 1960s; 1970s; 1980s; 1990s; 2000s
- See also: History of New Zealand; List of years in New Zealand; Timeline of New Zealand history

The following lists events that happened during 1989 in New Zealand.

== Population ==
- Estimated population as of 31 December: 3,369,800.
- Increase since 31 December 1988: 24,600 (0.74%).
- Males per 100 Females: 97.1.

== Incumbents ==
=== Regal and viceregal ===
- Head of State – Elizabeth II
- Governor-General – The Rt Revd. Sir Paul Reeves GCMG GCVO QSO

=== Government ===
The 42nd New Zealand Parliament continued. The fourth Labour Party government was in power.

- Speaker of the House – Kerry Burke
- Prime Minister – David Lange then Geoffrey Palmer
- Deputy Prime Minister – Geoffrey Palmer then Helen Clark
- Minister of Finance – David Caygill
- Minister of Foreign Affairs – Russell Marshall
- Chief Justice – Sir Ronald Davison (until 4 February), Sir Thomas Eichelbaum (starting 4 February)

=== Parliamentary opposition ===
- Leader of the Opposition – Jim Bolger (National).

=== Main centre leaders ===
- Mayor of Auckland – Catherine Tizard
- Mayor of Hamilton – Ross Jansen then Margaret Evans
- Mayor of Wellington – Jim Belich
- Mayor of Christchurch – Hamish Hay then Vicki Buck
- Mayor of Dunedin – Cliff Skeggs then Richard Walls

== Events ==
- First annual balance of payments surplus since 1973.
- The Reserve Bank Act sets the role of the Reserve Bank of New Zealand as maintaining price stability.
- The Tomorrow's Schools reforms shift substantial financial and administrative responsibilities for managing schools to elected boards of trustees.
- Local Government elections under a revised structure.
- The Māori Fisheries Act passed.
- The Sale of Liquor Act passed; it provided for supermarkets to sell wine (but not beer; this happened in 1999). Two amendments were also passed in 1989.
- February – Bob Jones unveils the Gore trout statue.
- April – Swedish tourists Urban Höglin and Heidi Paakkonen disappear while backpacking in the Coromandel, leading to the largest land-based search undertaken in New Zealand.
- 9–12 April – British Airways Concorde G-BOAF visits Christchurch Airport on a world tour.
- 25 April – David Lange suggests New Zealand should withdraw from the ANZUS council.
- 29 April – The Taranaki Herald publishes its last issue. The newspaper had published since 1852, and was New Zealand's oldest newspaper from 1935.
- 1 May – Jim Anderton forms the NewLabour Party.
- 1 July – GST is increased from 10% to 12.5%.
- 7 August – David Lange resigns as Prime Minister of New Zealand and is replaced by Geoffrey Palmer.
- 26 November – TV3 begins broadcasting.
- 28 November – The Abolition of the Death Penalty Act received Royal assent.
- 10 December – Sunday trading begins.

== Arts and literature ==
- Renee wins the Robert Burns Fellowship.

See 1989 in art, 1989 in literature, Category:1989 books

=== Music ===
==== New Zealand Music Awards ====
Winners are shown first with nominees underneath.

- Album of the Year: Margaret Urlich–Safety in Numbers
  - Fan Club – Respect The Beat
  - The Front Lawn – Songs from the Front Lawn
- Single of the Year: Margaret Urlich – "Escaping"
  - Fan Club – I Feel Love
  - Double J and Twice the T/ Ray Columbus – She's A Mod
- Best Male Vocalist: Tim Finn
  - Howard Morrison
  - Barry Saunders
- Best Female Vocalist: Margaret Urlich
  - Moana Jackson
  - Aishah
- Best Group: When The Cat's Away
  - The Warratahs
  - The Fan Club
- Most Promising Male Vocalist: Paul Ubana Jones
  - Greg Johnson
  - Darren Watson
- Most Promising Female Vocalist: Janet Roddick
  - Belinda Bradley
  - Julie Collier
- Most Promising Group: The Front Lawn
  - Double J and Twice the T
  - Upper Hutt Posse
- International Achievement: The Front Lawn
  - Kiri Te Kanawa
  - Straitjacket Fits
- Outstanding Contribution to the Music Industry: Tony Vercoe
- Best Video: Paul Middleditch / Polly Walker / Debbie Watson – I Feel Love (Fan Club)
  - Warrick (Waka) Attewell – St Peter's Rendezvous (Barry Saunders)
  - Tony Johns – She's A Mod/ Mod RAP (Double J and Twice the T)
- Best Film Soundtrack / Compilation: The Front Lawn – Songs From The Front Lawn
  - Rahda and the Brats - Kidz 'n the Middle
  - Various – This Is The Moment
- Best Producer: Ian Morris – Nobody Else
  - Mike Chunn – All Wrapped Up
  - Ross McDermott/Annie Crummer – Melting Pot (When The Cat's Away)
- Best Engineer: Nigel Stone/ Tim Farrant – Everything Will Be Alright
  - DC Bell – Please Say Something
  - Nick Morgan – Melting Pot
- Best Jazz Album: No Award
- Best Classical Album: Stanley Friedman – The Lyric Trumpet
  - Various Artists – Bold is Brass
  - Michael Houston – Scriabin/ Chopin
- Best Folk Album: Paul Ubana Jones – Paul Ubana Jones
  - Phil Powers – The Light of the Lions Eye
  - Phil Garland – Wind in the Tussock
- Best Gospel Album: Stephen Bell-Booth–Shelter
  - Guy Wishart – Another Day in Paradise
  - Steve Apirana – Steve Apirana
- Best Polynesian Album: Howard Morrison – Tukua Ahau
  - Moana & The Moahunters – Pupurutia
  - Black Katz Trust – Ko Wai Ka Hua
- Best Songwriter: Barry Saunders – St Peters Rendezvous
  - Tim Finn – Parihaka
  - Don McGlashan / Harry Sinclair – Andy
- Best Cover: Polly Walker / Debbie Watson – Safety in Numbers (Margaret Urlich)
  - Gavin Blake – Workshop
  - Anthony Donaldson/ Cadre Communications- The Hills Are Alive

See: 1989 in music

=== Performing arts ===
- Benny Award presented by the Variety Artists Club of New Zealand to Sylvia Rielly.

=== Radio and television ===
- 3 April: Paul Holmes makes his television appearance.
- 1 July: The Broadcasting Act 1989 removes restriction of broadcasting. The public broadcasting fee of NZ$110 per annum is established. Commercial television extends to seven days a week (excluding Good Friday, Easter Sunday and Christmas Day).
- 1 July: The Dunedin station is reduced to the Natural History Unit.
- 6 November: Channel 2 introduces morning television by commencing transmission at 6.30am weekdays and 7am weekends.
- 26 November: TV3 begins broadcasting with a two-hour preview show, with regular programming to follow at 7am the next morning.

1989 Listener Film and Television Awards

- Children's Programme: What Now, producer Keith Tyler-Smith
- Live Coverage: Seoul Olympics, director Jim Curry, organiser Wayne Tourell
- Factual Series: Week-end (Producer Bryan Williams), Wild South (Producer Neil Harraway)
- Entertainment Programme: Public Eye, producers Dave Gibson, Mary Glue
- Drama Programme: Erua, producer Ruth Franks
- Drama Series: Gloss
- Documentary Programme: Raglan By The Sea, producer Finola Dwyer
- Performance, Male, in a Dramatic Role: Grant Tilly, Erua
- Performance, Female, in a dramatic role: Ilona Rodgers, Gloss
- Presenter: Judy Bailey
- Entertainer: Funny Business
- Director: Tony Holden, Funny Business
- Camera: Ian Paul for Flight of Fancy
- Editing: John Gilbert, for Jean Batten.
- Writer, Drama: Rawiri Paratene, Erua.
- Writer, Non-Drama: Dean Butler, Willy De Wit, James Griffin, Ian Harcourt, Peter Murphy, for Funny Business
- Original Music: Herbs, The Power of Music
- Contribution to a Television Soundtrack: Wayne Laird, Ko Nakajima's Rangitoto
- Production/ Graphic Design: Fane Flaws
- Commercial: Telecom (rural couple), director Lee Tamahori

See: 1989 in New Zealand television, 1989 in television, List of TVNZ television programming, Category:Television in New Zealand, TV3 (New Zealand), Category:New Zealand television shows, Public broadcasting in New Zealand

=== Film ===
1989 Listener Film and Television Awards

- Film: The Navigator producer John Maynard.
- Director: Vincent Ward, The Navigator.
- Performance Male: Hamish McFarlane, The Navigator
- Performance Female: Greer Robson, Starlight Hotel
- Performance, male, in a supporting role: Noel Appleby, The Navigator
- Performance, Female, in a supporting Role: Sarah Peirse, The Navigator
- Cinematography: Geoffrey Simpson, The Navigator;
- Editing: John Scott, The Navigator.
- Production Design: Sally Campbell, The Navigator
- Original Screenplay: Geoff Chapple, Kely Lyons, Vincent Ward, The Navigator
- Score: Davood A. Tabrizi for The Navigator.
- Contribution to a Film Soundtrack: Dick Reade, The Navigator
- Short Film: Kitchen Sink, producer Bridget Ikin, director Alison Maclean

See: Category:1989 film awards, 1989 in film, List of New Zealand feature films, Cinema of New Zealand, Category:1989 films

== Sport ==
=== Athletics ===
- Paul Ballinger wins his fourth national title in the men's marathon, clocking 2:18:21 on 29 April in Rotorua, while Bernardine Portenski claims her first in the women's championship (2:46:02).

=== Deaflympics ===
- The XVI World Games for the Deaf were held in Christchurch from 7 to 17 January.

=== Horse racing ===
==== Harness racing ====
- New Zealand Trotting Cup: Inky Lord
- Auckland Trotting Cup: Neroship

=== Shooting ===
- Ballinger Belt – Ken Meade (Petone)

=== Soccer ===
- The Chatham Cup is won by Christchurch United who beat Rotorua City 7–1 in the final.

== Births ==
=== January ===
- 1 January – Willie Isa, rugby league player
- 3 January
  - Ben Matulino, rugby league player
  - Ben O'Keeffe, rugby union referee
- 6 January – Peter Betham, rugby union player
- 8 January – Aaron Cruden, rugby union player
- 18 January – Bryce Heem, rugby union player
- 20 January – Jared Waerea-Hargreaves, rugby league player
- 21 January
  - Brayden Mitchell, rugby union player
  - Dominique Peyroux, rugby league player
  - Nafi Tuitavake, rugby union player
- 26 January
  - Nicole Lewis, water polo player
  - Shaun Treeby, rugby union player
- 28 January – Emma Crum, road cyclist
- 29 January – Bradley Rodden, cricketer

=== February ===
- 1 February – Robert Eastham, sport shooter
- 2 February
  - Shane Archbold, racing cyclist
  - Codey Rei, rugby union player
- 6 February – Greg Morgan, cricketer
- 7 February – Hayley Saunders, netball player
- 8 February – Zac Guildford, rugby union player
- 9 February – Frae Wilson, rugby union player
- 12 February – Ellen Barry, tennis player
- 13 February – Daniel Faleafa, rugby union player
- 14 February – Sam Johnson, community activist
- 16 February
  - Phillipa Gray, Paralympic track cyclist
  - Ria van Dyke, beauty pageant contestant
- 19 February – Olivia Jobsis, artistic gymnast
- 21 February – Gareth Dawson, basketball player
- 24 February – Germaine Tang, rhythmic gymnast
- 28 February – Kevin Proctor, rugby league player

=== March ===
- 2 March – James So'oialo, rugby union player
- 10 March – Reta Trotman, road cyclist
- 11 March
  - Annabelle Carey, swimmer
  - Tom Taylor, rugby union player
- 14 March – Katie Glynn, field hockey player
- 16 March – Patrick Leafa, rugby union player
- 17 March – Richard Kingi, rugby union player
- 20 March
  - Karl Bryson, rugby union player
  - Andrew Pohl, cross-country skier
- 24 March – Leighton Price, rugby union player
- 27 March – Camilla Lees, netball player
- 28 March – Rachel Mercer, road cyclist
- 30 March – Adam McGeorge, association footballer

=== April ===
- 3 April – Te Huinga Reo Selby-Rickit, netball player
- 4 April – Kevin Locke, rugby league player
- 6 April – Joe Matapuku, rugby league player
- 7 April – Michael Guptill-Bunce, cricketer
- 15 April – Arana Taumata, rugby league player
- 17 April – Fa'atiga Lemalu, rugby union player
- 19 April – Lauren Ellis, track cyclist
- 22 April – Arun Panchia, field hockey player
- 26 April – Lucy Talbot, field hockey player
- 27 April – Hamish Rutherford, cricketer
- 30 April – Milo Cawthorne, actor

=== May ===
- 3 May – Jesse Bromwich, rugby league player
- 6 May – Rocky Khan, rugby union player
- 8 May
  - Tinirau Arona, rugby league player
  - Hayley Palmer, swimmer
- 9 May – Shane van Gisbergen, motor racing driver
- 10 May – Sean Reidy, rugby union player
- 11 May – Te Amo Amaru-Tibble, basketball and netball player
- 14 May – Vanessa Vandy, pole vaulter
- 15 May – Bailey Junior Kurariki, convicted criminal
- 17 May – Mose Masoe, rugby league player
- 21 May – Emily Robins, actor
- 27 May
  - Richard Buckman, rugby union player
  - Bailey Mes, netball player
- 31 May – Chase Stanley, rugby league player

=== June ===
- 2 June – Willy Moon, musician
- 7 June – James Hamilton, snowboarder
- 9 June – Baden Kerr, rugby union player
- 10 June – William Whetton, rugby union player
- 12 June – Tim Nanai-Williams, rugby union player
- 15 June – Katie Pearce, rhythmic gymnast
- 21 June – Albert Anae, rugby union player
- 23 June – Lisa Carrington, flatwater canoer

=== July ===
- 5 July – Lizzie Marvelly, singer, songwriter
- 9 July
  - Ella Gunson, field hockey player
  - Claire Kersten, netball player
- 13 July – Joel Abraham, cricketer
- 19 July – Sam McKendry, rugby league player
- 21 July
  - Jordan Selwyn, actor
  - Maama Vaipulu, rugby union player
- 22 July
  - Israel Adesanya, mixed martial artist
  - Trent Boult, cricketer
- 25 July – Blair Tuke, sailor
- 27 July
  - Penelope Marshall, swimmer
  - Jason Schirnack, rugby league player
- 31 July – Charlotte Harrison, field hockey player

=== August ===
- 3 August – Teddy Stanaway, rugby union player
- 11 August – Eddie Dawkins, track cyclist
- 13 August – Greg Draper, association footballer
- 15 August
  - Kendall Brown, snowboarder
  - Jordan Rapana, rugby league player
- 16 August – Alistair Bond, rower
- 21 August – Natasha Hind, swimmer
- 22 August – Robbie Robinson, rugby union player
- 23 August – George Worker, cricketer
- 31 August – James Lassche, rower

=== September ===
- 1 September – Sophie Devine, cricketer and field hockey player
- 4 September – Elliot Dixon, rugby union player
- 8 September – Jessica McCormack, basketball and netball player
- 11 September – Brendon O'Connor, rugby union player
- 13 September – Kenny Edwards, rugby league player
- 14 September
  - Constantine Mika, rugby league player
  - Pana Hema Taylor, actor
- 15 September
  - David Ambler, sprint athlete
  - Chetan Ramlu, musician
- 16 September – Nick Beard, cricketer
- 19 September
  - Marty Banks, rugby union player
  - Belgium Tuatagaloa, rugby union player
- 20 September – Evan Williams, squash player
- 21 September – Sandor Earl, rugby league player
- 23 September – Michael Arms, rower
- 24 September
  - Cathryn Finlayson, field hockey player
  - Leilani Van Dieren, rhythmic gymnast

=== October ===
- 7 October – Ben Botica, rugby union player
- 8 October – Sione Lousi, rugby league player
- 9 October – Russell Packer, rugby league player
- 10 October – Andrew Mathieson, cricketer
- 11 October – Robbie Manson, rower
- 12 October – Sarah Miller, artistic gymnast
- 13 October – Izaac Williams, basketball player
- 15 October – Dominic Storey, motor racing driver
- 19 October – Junior Fa, boxer
- 21 October – Ivana Palezevic, actor
- 23 October – Lauren Sieprath, water polo player
- 25 October – Tim Bond, rugby union player
- 28 October
  - Kelly Brazier, rugby union player
  - Claire Broadbent, rhythmic gymnast
  - Sam Dickson, rugby union player

=== November ===
- 1 November – Alehana Mara, rugby league player
- 2 November – Michael Pollard, cricketer
- 3 November – The Phantom Chance, Thoroughbred racehorse
- 8 November – Jessica Moulds, netball player
- 9 November – Marcus Daniell, tennis player
- 10 November – Brendon Hartley, motor racing driver
- 12 November – Dean Robinson, cricketer
- 13 November – Alex Feneridis, association footballer
- 14 November
  - Jake Robertson, athlete
  - Zane Robertson, athlete
- 15 November – Natasha Hansen, track cyclist
- 15 November – Courtney Abbot, actor
- 18 November – Brady Barnett, cricketer
- 19 November – Andrew Marck, baseball player
- 20 November – Abby Erceg, association footballer
- 29 November – Jonathon Bassett-Graham, cricketer

=== December ===
- 2 December – Jack Wilson, rugby union player
- 4 December – Buxton Popoali'i, rugby union player
- 7 December – Ria Percival, association footballer
- 8 December
  - Jono Lester, motor racing driver
  - Jesse Sene-Lefao, rugby league player
- 14 December – Amini Fonua, swimmer
- 15 December
  - David Ambler, track athlete
  - Ian Hogg, association footballer
- 20 December – Leeson Ah Mau, rugby league player
- 21 December – Ashley Smallfield, water polo player
- 22 December – Josh Junior, sailor
- 29 December – Michael Stanley, rugby union player

=== Exact date unknown ===
- Ben Sanders, crime writer
- Owen Walker, computer hacker

== Deaths ==
=== January–March ===
- 8 January – Giovanni Cataldo, fisherman, search & rescue organiser (born 1927)
- 21 January – Tiny Leys, rugby union player (born 1907)
- 22 January – Fred Ladd, aviator (born 1908)
- 29 January – Seton Otway, racehorse owner and breeder (born 1894)
- 2 February
  - Harry Highet, engineer, designer of the P-class yacht (born 1892)
  - Sir Arnold Nordmeyer, politician (born 1901)
- 9 February – Bill Dalley, rugby union player and administrator (born 1901)
- 13 February – Archie Strang. rugby union player (born 1906)
- 15 February – Hōri Ngata, lexicographer, local-body politician (born 1919)
- 20 February – Stuart Black, athlete (born 1908)
- 24 February – Leila Hurle, educator, school inspector (born 1901)
- 4 March
  - Harold Miller, librarian, historian (born 1898)
  - Randolph Rose, athlete (born 1901)
- 7 March – Nevile Lodge, cartoonist (born 1918)
- 8 March – Alf Budd, rugby union player (born 1922)

=== April–June ===
- 2 April – Sir James Henare, soldier, Ngāpuhi leader (born 1911)
- 6 April – Marjorie Chambers, nurse, nursing tutor and administrator (born 1906)
- 13 April – Frank Hofmann, photographer, musician (born 1916)
- 22 April
  - Mary Campbell, librarian, Quaker (born 1907)
  - Vi Farrell, cricketer (born 1913)
- 23 April – Rupert Worker, cricketer (born 1896)
- 30 April – Nelson Dalzell, rugby union player (born 1921)
- 2 May – Freddie French, rugby league player (born 1911)
- 5 May – Dame Sister Mary Leo, music teacher (born 1895)
- 13 May – Sir Lance Cross, basketball player, sports administrator and broadcaster (born 1912)
- 4 June – Vernon Cracknell, politician (born 1912)
- 12 June – Cath Vautier, netball player, coach and administrator (born 1902)
- 26 June – Earle Riddiford, lawyer and mountaineer (born 1921)

=== July–September ===
- 1 July
  - Eric Holland, politician (born 1921)
  - Olga Sansom, botanist, broadcaster, museum director (born 1900)
- 15 July – Jack Scholes, sailor (born 1917)
- 14 August – Sir Dove-Myer Robinson, politician, mayor of Auckland (1968–80) (born 1901)
- 28 August – Sir Robert Macintosh, anaesthetist (born 1897)
- 1 September – Mac Cooper, agricultural scientist (born 1910)
- 4 September – Sir Ronald Syme, historian (born 1903)
- 11 September
  - Roy Traill, wildlife ranger (born 1892)
  - Freddie Wood, historian (born 1903)
- 14 September – Eddie McLeod, cricketer (born 1900)
- 15 September – Harry Cave, cricketer (born 1922)
- 18 September – Sir Peter Phipps, military leader (born 1908)

=== October–December ===
- 1 October – David Penman, Anglican archbishop (born 1936)
- 2 October – Bert Grenside, rugby union player (born 1899)
- 7 October
  - Keith Elliott, soldier, recipient of the Victoria Cross (born 1916)
  - Pat Twohill, actor and radio announcer (born 1915)
- 11 October – Joe Procter, rugby union player (born 1906)
- 14 October – Rodney Kennedy, artist, art critic, pacifist (born 1909)
- 23 October – Howard Alloo, cricketer (born 1895)
- 24 October – Eileen Soper, journalist, writer, Girl Guide commissioner (born 1900)
- 26 October – Andrew Roberts, cricketer (born 1947)
- 18 November – Pat Hond, police officer, teacher, Taranaki Māori leader (born 1927)
- 25 November – Kōhine Pōnika, composer of waiata Māori (born 1920)
- 28 November
  - Beethoven Algar, rugby union player (born 1894)
  - Stan Cawtheray, association footballer (born 1906)
- 30 November – Wiremu Heke, rugby union player (born 1894)
- 2 December – Norman Davis, English language and literature academic (born 1913)
- 8 December – Jack Rankin, rugby union player and coach (born 1914)
- 9 December – Brett Austin, swimmer (born 1959)
- 13 December – Peter de la Mare, physical organic chemist (born 1920)
- 27 December – Ron Ulmer, track cyclist (born 1913)

== See also ==
- List of years in New Zealand
- Timeline of New Zealand history
- History of New Zealand
- Military history of New Zealand
- Timeline of the New Zealand environment
- Timeline of New Zealand's links with Antarctica
