= Middle Age Spread =

- Directed by: John Reid
- Written by: Roger Hall (play); Keith Aberdein (screenplay)
- Produced by: John Barnett
- Starring: Grant Tilly; Donna Akersten; Dorothy McKegg; Bridget Armstrong; Bevan Wilson; Peter Sumner
- Cinematography: Alun Bollinger
- Edited by: Michael Horton
- Music by: Stephen McCurdy
- Distributed by: Endeavour Productions
- Release date: 1979
- Running time: 98 minutes
- Country: New Zealand
- Language: English

Middle Age Spread is a 1979 New Zealand film. It is an adaptation of the Roger Hall play of the same name. This is John Reid's directorial feature debut.

== Plot ==
A deputy principal of a high school takes up jogging to combat a spreading waistline and gradually enters into an affair with a co-worker's wife when his wife loses interest in him.

== Cast ==
- Grant Tilly – Colin
- Donna Akersten – Judy
- Dorothy McKegg – Elizabeth
- Bridget Armstrong – Isobel
- Bevan Wilson – Robert
- Peter Sumner – Reg
