= Conjugal Rites (TV series) =

- Genre: Sitcom
- Directed by: David Askey; Mike Vardy
- Starring: Gwen Taylor; Michael Williams; Cordelia Bugeja
- Country of origin: United Kingdom
- Original language: English
- No. of series: 2
- No. of episodes: 13

Production
- Running time: 30 minutes
- Production company: Granada Television

Original release
- Network: ITV
- Release: 16 April 1993 – 17 June 1994

Conjugal Rites is a British television sitcom which aired on ITV in two series between 16 April 1993 and 17 June 1994. It is based on the 1991 play Conjugal Rites by Roger Hall, with Gwen Taylor reprising the role she had played on stage.

== Main cast ==
- Gwen Taylor as Gen Masefield
- Michael Williams as Barry Masefield
- Stephen Moyer as Philip Masefield
- Cordelia Bugeja as Gillian Masefield
- Alan MacNaughtan as Jack
- Warren Clarke as Toby

== Bibliography ==
- Howard Maxford. Hammer Complete: The Films, the Personnel, the Company. McFarland, 2018.
