= Jane Soons =

New Zealand geomorphologist (1931–2020)

- Born: 18 June 1931; Great Gonerby, Lincolnshire, England
- Died: 8 September 2020 (aged 89); Christchurch, New Zealand
- Education: University of Sheffield, BA (Hons); University of Glasgow, PhD
- Known for: Being the first female professor at the University of Canterbury
- Awards: Distinguished New Zealand Geographer Medal
- Scientific career
- Fields: Glacial geomorphology and physical geography
- Workplaces: University of Canterbury (UC)
- Thesis: The geomorphology of the Ochil hills (1958)

Jane Margaret Soons (18 June 1931 – 8 September 2020) was a New Zealand geomorphologist and pioneering role model for female students. In 1971, she was the first woman professor at the University of Canterbury, and possibly the first in New Zealand.

== Biography ==
Soons was born on 18 June 1931, and grew up in a council cottage in the small English village of Great Gonerby. Her father, Lewin Soons, worked for the railways. He was a good trade unionist and loved reading books. Her mother, Jenny, was a hard worker. After Lewin became bedridden with tuberculosis, Jenny took over tending their large vegetable garden and orchard that provided a little income. At age eleven, Soons won a scholarship to Kesteven and Grantham Girls' School and started in the third form the year that Margaret Thatcher was a prefect at the school.

In 1949, she won another scholarship, this time to University of Sheffield. She recalled that her choice to study geography was "just one of those things"; however, she soon became enthralled with the subject. She attained a BA Hons in 1952 and DipEd in 1953, and went on to spend five months studying applied geomorphology at the University of Strasbourg.

Subsequently, in 1958, she became one of the first woman PhD graduates in geography at the University of Glasgow. After tutoring at two British universities, she became fed-up with being overlooked for higher academic positions, due to what she described as "an inbred feeling that this was not a women’s world". Through George Jobberns she heard about a lecturer position on the other side of the world, at the University of Canterbury's Department of Geography. In 1960s Britain, the idea that a woman could combine an academic career with having a family was viewed as odd; New Zealanders, she later learnt, were, on the whole, rather less anti-woman and more relaxed.

At the geography department in Christchurch, she felt accepted, and discovered that she was expected to do everything that the men did. Hard work led to promotion, promotion led to research opportunities, research led to a professorship, and a professorship made her a role model. For many years the sole woman academic staff member; by 2019 seven out of 17 academic staff in the geography department were women.

She is remembered by her students and colleagues for her kindness, praise and support of their work, as well as her lectures and mentoring of young geomorphologists and female scientists.

Soons is nationally and internationally known for her investigations of glacier-sculpted landforms in the Rakaia Valley and her contribution to debates around environmental change in the central South Island. She served as head of department from 1990 until she retired. On her retirement in 1993, Soons was accorded the title of professor emeritus. Other highlights of her distinguished careers include being president of the International Union of Quaternary Research and convenor of the National Committee for Quaternary Research for the Royal Society.

In addition to writing and collaborating on books and journal articles, she wrote an entry for the Dictionary of New Zealand Biography on George Jobberns, the geographer and educator, who played a role in her immigrating to New Zealand. Soons was never one to sit idle, and even after retirement, she taught at the Canterbury Workers' Educational Association (CWEA) and was secretary of both the UC Alumni Association and the Diamond Harbour Ladies Bowling Club.

Soons died in Christchurch on 8 September 2020, aged 89.

== Recognition ==
- Erskine Fellowship 1975
- David Livingstone Centenary Medal for Southern Hemisphere research (awarded by the American Geographical Society) 1988
- Royal Society Silver Medal 1994
- Honorary Doctor of Science from University of Glasgow 2009
- Distinguished New Zealand Medal (awarded by the New Zealand Geographical Society) 2001
- In 2017 Soons was selected as one of the Royal Society Te Apārangi's "150 women in 150 words", celebrating the contributions of women to knowledge in New Zealand.
- The University of Canterbury renamed the Geography Building to Jane Soons in her honour in June 2021.

== Selected publications ==
- Rainfall/runoff relationships at Cass, in the South Island high country, 1970, N.Z. Hydrological Society, National Library of New Zealand Catalogue
- Recent changes in the Franz Josef glacier, 1971, New Zealand Geographical Society, University of Canterbury Library
- Water: with reference to Australia and New Zealand, 1972, Reed Education, Wellington N.Z., OCLC 28999138, ISBN 9780589048365, National Library of New Zealand Catalogue
- co-authored with Michael Selby, Landforms of New Zealand, Longman Paul, Auckland, N.Z, 1982, OCLC 10262514, ISBN 9780582717862, National Library of New Zealand Catalogue
- Jubilee cookbook: fifty recipes for fifty years, 1986, Department of Geography, University of Canterbury, OCLC 152396045 (a booklet of recipes shared by visitors to the Department of Geography, compiled for the department's 50th Jubilee celebrations), National Library of New Zealand Catalogue
- Jobberns, George, Dictionary of New Zealand Biography, first published in 1998. Te Ara – the Encyclopedia of New Zealand
