= Swimming Pool (2001 film) =

Film by Boris von Sychowski

- Promotional poster
- Directed by: Boris von Sychowski
- Written by: Lorenz Stassen; Boris von Sychowski; Ryan Carrassi (dialogue)
- Produced by: Benjamin Herrmann; Werner Possardt
- Starring: Kristen Miller; Elena Uhlig; Thorsten Grasshoff; John Hopkins; Isla Fisher; Jason Liggett; Cordelia Bugeja; James McAvoy
- Cinematography: Notker Mahr
- Edited by: Sabine Mahr-Haigis
- Music by: Johannes Kobilke
- Production companies: Senator Film Produktion; Calypso Filmproduktion
- Distributed by: Senator Film (Germany); Senator International (International)
- Release date: 4 October 2001
- Running time: 92 minutes
- Country: Germany
- Language: English

Swimming Pool (also known as Swimming Pool - Der Tod feiert mit (Death celebrates with us) in Germany, and The Pool - Basen in the US and UK) is a 2001 English-language German slasher film directed by Boris von Sychowski and starring Kristen Miller, Elena Uhlig, Thorsten Grasshoff, John Hopkins, Isla Fisher, Jason Liggett, Jonah Lotan, Cordelia Bugeja, James McAvoy, Linda Rybová, Bryan Carney, Maximilian Grill, Anna Geislerová, Jan Vlasák, Daniel Wurm, Pavel Cajzl, Marek Libert, Karel Belohradsky and Josef Peichal. It follows a group of students at an elite international school in Prague who break into an indoor water park where they are stalked by a masked murderer.

== Plot ==
Catherine is cooking dinner, expecting her boyfriend to arrive. She discovers his car in her driveway, and inside finds him with his throat slit. A killer wearing a skull mask breaks into the home and murders her, throwing her body in a swimming pool.

Shortly after, a group of international students from an elite Prague school are graduating; among them are the American Sarah; the Scottish Mike; the English Frank; Kim, an Australian; Carmen, from Germany; Diego, from Argentina; and others. To celebrate, Sarah's boyfriend Greg plans to break into an indoor swimming complex with the help of Martin, an American former student and employee of the water park. On finals day, Kim is upset over failing her tests. She and Mike, her boyfriend, go swimming at a lake, and she tells him she feels like an outcast among him and his wealthy peers; she decides not to attend the party. Later, Kim is stabbed to death in the woods by the masked killer.

Late that night, the group arrive at the water park and are let inside by Martin, where they begin drinking and swimming in the pools. Svenja and Carter go to an isolated pool to ride a water slide. While Carter waits for her at the bottom, he is stabbed to death. As Svenja descends the waterslide, the killer drives a machete through the bottom of the slide, slicing through her groin. Shortly after, Carmen and Chris discover their bodies floating in the pool. Carmen and Chris locate the remainder of the group, but they find that all exits have been locked. Meanwhile, Martin and Mel find an empty weight room to have sex. When Martin goes to retrieve a condom, Mel is attacked by the killer chased into a locker room where she is killed.

Aware that a killer is loose, Sarah, Mike, Carmen, and Chris intercept Martin en route back to the weight room. In a panic, they rush to save Mel, but find her corpse in a bathroom stall. The group are unable to locate Greg, Frank, or Diego, and Martin finds that the lock picks and spare keys to the building have been removed; the phones have also been disconnected. Martin recalls an air duct leading out of the building. He goes ahead to dismantle a vent grate, after which Sarah, Mike, and Carmen follow; Chris stays behind, as they are unable to turn around and lift him from inside the duct. As they crawl through the duct, the killer begins driving his machete through the bottom of it, killing Mike and Martin.

Sarah and Carmen escape through a separate duct into the basement, where they are confronted by the killer, who chases them through the building. They momentarily hide in a security monitor room and ponder who the killer is; Carmen believes it is Greg. Meanwhile, Diego and Greg find Chris, terrified. Greg decides to enter the air duct to find a way out, and Diego waits with Chris. Greg finds Sarah and Carmen in a room overlooking the pool. Convinced he is the killer, Carmen knocks him unconscious, and she and Sarah lock him inside. Carmen attempts to swim into a filter chamber to exit the building. She injures her leg in the process, but is able to access the exterior of the building. Outside, she finds a security guard's corpse with a gun lying next to it, but before she can retrieve it, she is stabbed by the killer and thrown back into the filter chamber.

Inside, Sarah is confronted by Frank, who reveals himself to be the killer, motivated out of spite and jealousy over his failed romantic advances on each of the women. Sarah manages to douse him with vodka and light him on fire, but he leaps into the pool. Greg breaks free of the room overlooking the pool, jumping into the pool below, and the men begin to fight. Sarah enters the water and manages to stab Frank with a broken bottle. He rises from the water while Greg and Sarah attempt to flee, but is shot to death by Carmen, who survived the earlier attack.

== Cast ==
- Kristen Miller as Sarah
- Elena Uhlig as Carmen
- Thorsten Grasshoff as Gregor
- John Hopkins as Frank
- Isla Fisher as Kim
- Jason Liggett as Martin
- Jonah Lotan as Chris
- Cordelia Bugeja as Melanie
- James McAvoy as Mike
- Linda Rybová as Svenja
- Bryan Carney as Carter
- Maximilian Grill as Diego
- Anna Geislerová as Catherine
- Jan Vlasák as Kadankov
- Daniel Wurm as Tommy
- Pavel Cajzl as Tommy
- Marek Libert as Kadankov's assistant
- Karel Belohradsky as security guard
- Josef Pejchal as Oliver

== Production ==
Swimming Pool was filmed entirely on location in Prague and Liberec, Czech Republic.

== Reception ==
Swimming Pool holds a 45% approval rating on Rotten Tomatoes, based on eleven reviews with an average rating of 5.50/10. Film critic Jim Harper wrote: "With the basic material so derivative and stereotyped, The Pool wasn't going to be a classic, but might have lifted itself above the average. Sadly it's also stuck with some atrocious performances and a dumb script."

== Sequel ==
The Pool 2 received a brief theatrical release in Italy in 2005 due to its predecessor's modest box office success in the country. Directed by Tiziano Pellegris from a script by Ryan Carrassi, the film was primarily composed of Italian-dubbed footage from Do You Wanna Know a Secret? intercut with new material shot by Pellegris. The Pool 2 was pulled from theaters due to rights issues and has since become lost.

== See also ==
- Spree killer

== Works cited ==
- Harper, Jim (2004). Legacy of Blood: A Comprehensive Guide to Slasher Movies. United Kingdom: Critical Vision. ISBN 978-1-900-48639-2.
