= Conjugal Rites =

Play written by Roger Hall

Conjugal Rites is a play by the actor and playwright Roger Hall.

== Performance history ==
Conjugal Rites was first performed in the United Kingdom at the Watford Palace Theatre on 24 January 1991. It starred Nicky Henson and Gwen Taylor.

The play was premiered at Centrepoint Theatre, Palmerston North in 1990 - starring Alice Fraser and Geoffrey Heath. It was also performed in New Zealand at the Fortune Theatre (New Zealand) in Dunedin. It starred Timothy Bartlett and Janet Fisher.

In 2011, Conjugal Rites was performed at The Courtyard Theatre in London, directed by Andrew Keates and starring Alexandra Boyd and Gary Heron.

== Characters ==
- Barry, late forties/fifty
- Gen(evieve), a few years younger than Barry

== Synopsis ==
Barry, a dentist, and his wife Gen are in bed when the play begins. They are about to celebrate their 21st wedding anniversary. The scene - their bedroom - remains the same throughout the play, as we see the couple discussing their marriage, their grown-up children and their work.

It is clear that a major shift has occurred in the power balance between the two of them, since Gen has studied for a law degree in later life, and has recently become a practising solicitor.

Towards the end of the play there are revelations about infidelities on both their parts - Barry with a patient, and Gen with a fellow solicitor.

== TV adaptation ==
Conjugal Rites was adapted as a situation comedy for ITV made by Granada Television which ran to 13 episodes over two series in 1993 and 1994. The lead roles were taken by Gwen Taylor and Michael Williams. Though they are only referred to, but not seen, in the stage play, the couple's son and daughter appear in the sitcom: Phillip (Stephen Moyer) and Gillian (Cordelia Bugeja).
