= Fosbery =

Fosbery may refer to:

== Places ==
- Fosbery, Manitoba until 1897, former name of Laurier, Manitoba

== Things ==
- The Webley-Fosbery Automatic Revolver

== People ==
=== Surname ===
- George Vincent Fosbery (1832–1907), British Lieutenant Colonel who won the Victoria Cross, and a designer of firearms
- H.J.W. Fosbery, British tennis player finalist at the 1893 Wimbledon Championships and 1905 Wimbledon Championships
- Thomas Vincent Fosbery (1807–1875), hymnologist, chaplain to Bishop Samuel Wilberforce, founder of the Girls' Friendly Society
- William Fosbery, High Sheriff of Limerick City in 1781

=== Middle/maiden name ===
- George Fosbery Lyster (1821–1899), British engineer and dock builder
- Eileen Marjorie Fosbery Chambers (1906–1989), New Zealand nurse and hospital administrator
