= Ginette McDonald =

New Zealand actor, and television producer and director

Ginette McDonald ONZM
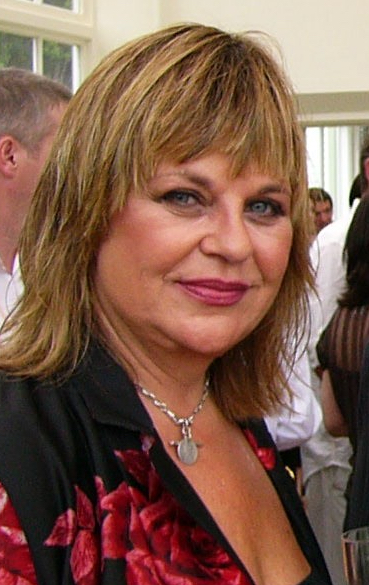
- McDonald in 2008
- Born: Ginette Denise McDonald; 18 April 1952 (age 74); Wellington, New Zealand
- Education: Erskine College
- Occupations: Actor; television producer; television director
- Years active: 1967–
- Known for: "Lyn of Tawa"

Ginette Denise McDonald ONZM (born 18 April 1952) is a New Zealand actress, and television producer and director, best known for her comedic alter ego, "Lyn of Tawa".

== Early life ==
McDonald was born in Wellington on 18 April 1952, the daughter of Joan Margaret McDonald (née Legg) and James Joseph McDonald, and educated at Erskine College.

== Acting career ==
Beginning her professional acting career on stage and radio as a teenager, first appearing at Wellington's Downstage Theatre in 1967. McDonald made her New Zealand television debut in 1971 in an episode of the drama series Pukemanu. She then spent five years in London, where her television appearances included small parts in programmes including Harriet's Back in Town, Angels and The Nine Tailors, and the lead in the television play Sweeping Plains. She also appeared in the production of Don's Party at the Royal Court Theatre in 1975.

Following her return to New Zealand in 1976, McDonald played the role of Shirley Paget in the television soap opera Close to Home. She also played Beryl in the original television adaptation of Roger Hall's play Glide Time.

From the late 1970s McDonald's best-known character, "Lyn of Tawa", was seen on New Zealand television in her own series (the theme song to which was a remake of the instrumental tune "The Happy Organ"), as well as in a monologue during the 1981 Royal Variety Performance at the St James Theatre, Auckland. Lyn reappeared in the 1990s in In Search of the Great New Zealand Male and Visual Symphonies.

In 1979, McDonald portrayed cheerful mother-to-be Sandra Allenby opposite Stephen Tozer in the tele-movie It's Your Child, Norman Allenby. She played the title character in the 1983 television drama Pioneer Women – Hera Ngoungou. In 1989 she appeared as Lady Guinevere Galaxy in the children's sci-fi television series Space Knights.

During the 1990s, McDonald's acting credits included Dead Certs (1995) alongside Rawiri Paratene, Face Value – Her New Life (1995)—which she also produced—and Duggan (1999). She also presented the New Zealand version of the garden makeover show Ground Force from 1998 to 1999. She played June Ramsay in the 1997 production of Anthony McCarten's play Four Cities at Circa Theatre in Wellington.

In the 2000s she has appeared in the one-woman play My Brilliant Divorce at Downstage, and as Rhonda in the 2011 tele-movie Rage, set during the 1981 Springbok tour. She also played the role of a marriage celebrant in the 2009 New Zealand movie Separation City. In 2022, she appeared in an episode of season 3 of My Life Is Murder. Her daughter Kate McGill is also an actress. In 2024, she appeared in The Rule of Jenny Pen. In 2025 she appeared in the science fiction comedy series Warren's Vortex as Mrs Schrodinger.

== "Lyn of Tawa" ==
McDonald's alter ego, "Lyn of Tawa", first appeared onstage as a result of a backstage encounter between McDonald and playwright Bruce Mason in the late 1960s, in which Mason heard McDonald experiment with various accents. McDonald subsequently created "Lyn of Tawa" and, together with Mason and Roger Hall, wrote a series of sketches featuring the character for the revue show Knickers. It was, however, after McDonald's return from London that Lyn really came to prominence, following her appearance at a celebrity roast for Judith Fyfe, which led to spots on variety shows, then one-off special and culminated in her own series.

McDonald said in 2016 that she would "let go" of Lyn of Tawa to take on older roles.

== Career as producer and director ==
McDonald made her debut as a television director and producer on the final series of Gliding On. She also directed episodes of Close to Home, Open House and Country GP. McDonald produced the award-winning kidult television series The Fire-Raiser, written by Maurice Gee, and was the creator and producer of the 1987 series Peppermint Twist. She also produced another series written by Maurice Gee, The Champion, in 1989. Other programmes produced by McDonald include the television adaptations of the 1997 play Nga Wahine by Riwia Brown, and Joyful and Triumphant by Robert Lord.

== Honours and awards ==
In 1970 McDonald won the Hollywood Bowl radio award for best voice commercial. She was twice named best actress at the Feltex Awards, in 1980 and 1984, for her roles in Pioneer Women and It's Your Child, respectively. In 1989, she won the best drama and best children's programme trophies for The Fire-Raiser at the GOFTA awards, and also won an Australian Pater Award for producer of the best drama series for the same show. McDonald was a nominated finalist for Face Value – Her New Life at the Banff and New York Television Festivals.

In the 2007 Queen’s Birthday Honours, McDonald was appointed an Officer of the New Zealand Order of Merit, for services to entertainment.
