= Barbara Ewing =

British actress, playwright and novelist

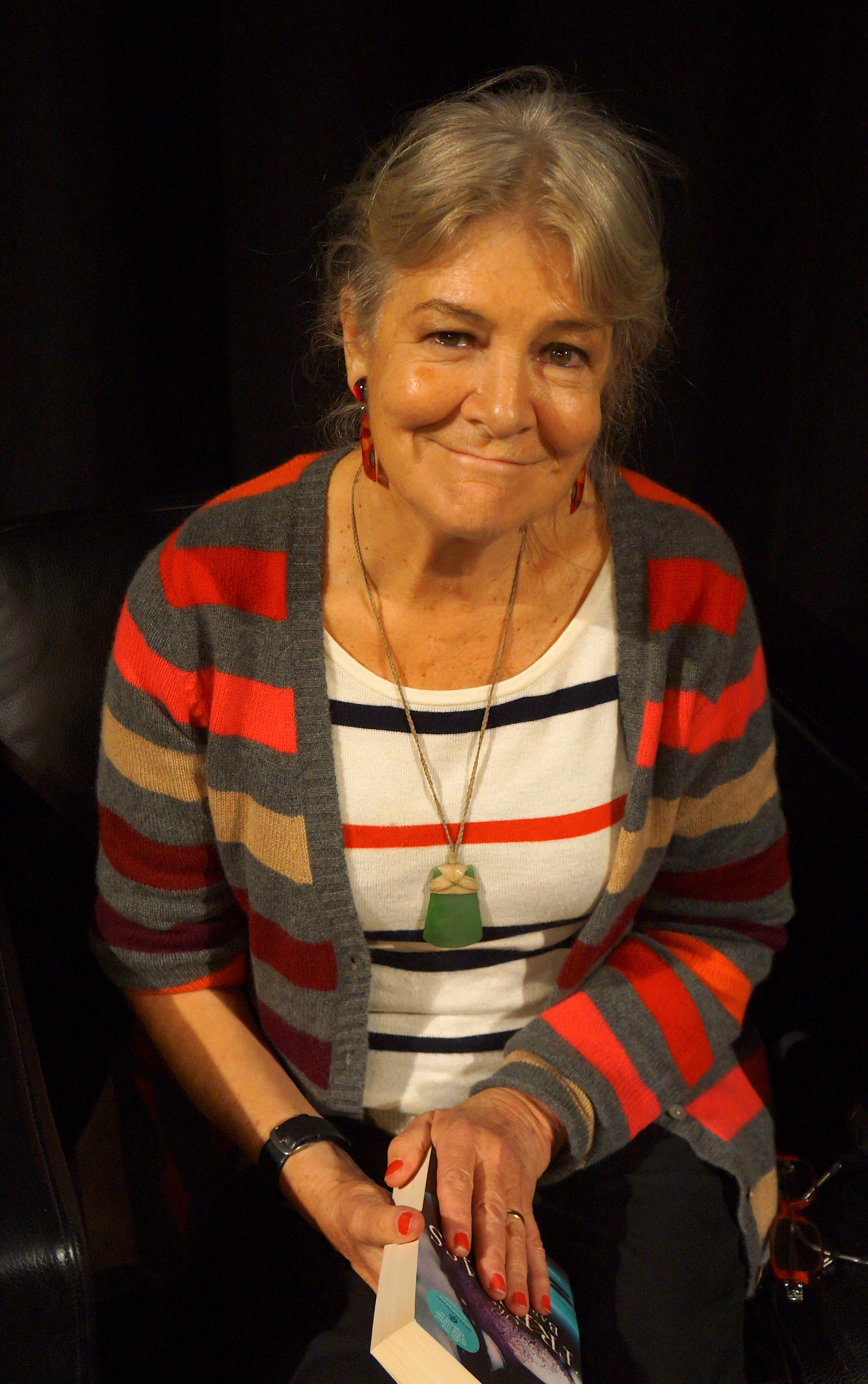
At the 2012 Frankfurt Book Fair

Barbara Ewing (born 14 January 1939) is a New Zealand actress, playwright and novelist based in the UK. In the 1980s Ewing played the character Agnes Fairchild in British comedy series Brass. Ewing's novel The Petticoat Men was shortlisted for the Ngaio Marsh Award in 2015.

== Early life ==
Ewing was born in Carterton, New Zealand. Her father's job at the Ministry of Education included reviewing books, and he brought many home for Ewing to read as she was growing up. She started writing when she was young. Ewing attended Wellington East Girls' College then graduated from Victoria University of Wellington with a BA in English and Māori language before receiving a New Zealand Government scholarship and moving to Britain in 1962 to train as an actor at RADA (the Royal Academy of Dramatic Art) in London. There was no national acting school training in New Zealand at the time. She graduated in 1965.

== Career ==
=== Actor ===
Her first television role was in A Choice of Kings (1966). Her first film role was in the horror film Torture Garden (1967) with Amicus Productions. The next film was Dracula Has Risen from the Grave (1968) with Hammer Films directed by Freddie Francis. She has had film acting roles in The Reckoning (1969), S.O.S. Titanic (1979), Eye of the Needle (1981), Haunters of the Deep (1984) (Children's Film Foundation), When the Whales Came (1989), Brothers of the Head (2005) and Mute (2018).

Television acting roles included the Granada Television comedy series Brass with Timothy West (1983–90), the character Treen Dudgeon in the BBC series Comrade Dad (1986) with George Cole and Doris Hare, A Ghost Story for Christmas, titled The Ash Tree (1975), playing Anne Mothersole who was tried as a witch, and she was in one episode of The Sweeney (S4-E7 'Bait') in 1978.

Other TV shows Ewing has appeared in include the New Zealand series Rachel (1970s) for which she won an award. Also in New Zealand in one episode of Pioneer Women she played the founder of South Island district nursing Nurse Sibylla Maude, and she was a journalist in the drama series Loose Enz by Tom Scott. In the UK she has been in episodes of Casualty, Doctors and Holby City on the BBC, and The Bill and Peak Practice on ITV, and appeared in some Ruth Rendell mysteries.

Ewing featured in Apirana Taylor's play in 1995 called Whaea Kairau - Mother Hundred Eater in Wellington, New Zealand directed by Colin McColl, designed by Dorita Hannah and produced by Taki Rua Theatre.

Also as a stage actor Ewing had a hit one-woman show in 1989, Alexandra Kollontai, about the only woman in Lenin's cabinet in 1917. It gained acclaim in London, and at the Edinburgh and Sydney Festivals. She has performed in New Zealand and in the UK playing leads in plays from Shaw, Ibsen, Tennessee Williams, Shakespeare and others.

=== Published books ===
- Strangers (1978)
- The Actresses (1997)
- A Dangerous Vine (1999)
- The Trespass (2002)
- Rosetta (2005)
- The Mesmerist (2007)
- The Fraud (2009)
- The Circus of Ghosts (2011) (sequel to The Mesmerist)
- The Petticoat Men (2014)
- One Minute Crying Time (2020)

On 17 February 2015, it was announced that Ewing's The Petticoat Men had made the longlist for the prestigious Ngaio Marsh Award, a crime fiction award in her home country of New Zealand.

In 2020, Ewing's memoir One Minute Crying Time was published. Covering her childhood, adolescence and early-adulthood in New Zealand, the book takes the reader up to 1962 when she left for the UK, and draws from diary and later journal entries Ewing kept from the ages of 12 to 23. It includes a romantic relation with a young Māori man which at the time was controversial.

== Awards ==
1979 - New Zealand Feltex Award for Best Actress in Rachel

2015 - Shortlisted for the Ngaio Marsh Award for Best Crime Novel for The Petticoat Men (Head of Zeus, 2014)

== Sources ==
- Ewing, Barbara (2020). One Minute Crying Time. Albany, Auckland: Massey University Press. ISBN 978-0-9951229-5-6
