= Middle-Age Spread =

Play written by Roger Hall

- Written by: Roger Hall
- Original language: English
- Subject: as a conventional dinner proceeds a series of flashbacks to the preceding weeks shows hidden links and stresses among all three couples
- Genre: Comedy

Premiere
- Date premiered: 1977
- Place premiered: Circa Theatre; Wellington, New Zealand

Middle-Age Spread is a 1977 play written by New Zealand playwright Roger Hall that premiered at the Circa Theatre in Wellington, New Zealand. The play was later staged at the London West End Lyric Theatre in 1978, winning the Laurence Olivier Award Comedy of the Year.

== Film adaptation ==
The play was adapted by Keith Aberdein, released in 16 mm film format in 1979, directed by John Reid, with Grant Tilly, Donna Akersten, Dorothy McKegg, and Bridget Armstrong.
