= Rachel (TV series) =

- Written by: Keith Aberdein
- Directed by: Peter Muxlow; Tony Isaac; Ross Jennings; Keith Aberdein
- Starring: Barbara Ewing
- Country of origin: New Zealand
- Original language: English
- No. of seasons: 1
- No. of episodes: 6

Production
- Producer: John Anderson
- Running time: 60 minutes
- Production company: TV1

Original release
- Release: October 10 – November 14, 1978

Rachel is a New Zealand television series. Written by Keith Aberdein, it was a 6 part series that starred Barbara Ewing as a woman who inherits a farm from her father who she already thought had died decades before.

Production of the series was threatend due to industrial action but filming resumed with Ewing staying in New Zealand for longer time than planned to finish the show. Partway through production she took a trip to Britain to film an episode of The Sweeney.

== Cast ==
- Barbara Ewing as Rachel
- Martyn Sanderson as Tom
- Dorothy McKegg as Mary
- Deborah Doole as Maggie
- John Bach as Dave
- Bill Stalker as Lascelles
- Grant Tilly as Jim

== Reception ==
Nancy Cawley wrote in the Press that it looked "like being another memorable milestone in New Zealand film-making." She adds "Two aspects of the production are remarkable for their high quality - the sets and the music."

== Awards ==
New Zealand Feltex Awards 1979

- Best Actress - Barbara Ewing - won
