= Cuckoo Land =

- Created by: Margaret Mahy
- Directed by: Yvonne MacKay
- Narrated by: Paul Holmes
- Composer: Jenny McLeod
- Country of origin: New Zealand
- No. of episodes: 6

Production
- Producer: Dave Gibson
- Cinematography: Peter Read
- Running time: 25 minutes

Original release
- Network: Television 2
- Release: 3 April – 8 May 1986

Cuckoo Land is a short (6 episodes, 25 min each) TV drama/adventure series from New Zealand, which aired in 1986. The series was created by Margaret Mahy, directed by Yvonne MacKay and produced by Dave Gibson. Filming began on April Fools day in 1985 and it had a budget of around a million dollars. Deirdre MacPherson in the Sydney Morning Herald called it "the strangest and most technologically spectacular show I've ever seen."

Cuckoo Land was nominated for 6 awards at the 1987 Guild of Film and Television Arts Awards.

The series first aired in Australia on the ABC beginning 3 April 1986, followed by New Zealand on Two beginning 10 August 1986. It was screened on Britain's CBBC in 1991.

== Cast ==
- Jennifer Ludlam as Petunia
- Eleanor Gibson as Polly
- Kendyl Robson as Patch
- Paul Holmes as narrator (voice only)
- Grant Tilly as Branchy
- Gerald Bryan as Postman / Ted (5 episodes)
- William Kircher as Crocodile Crosby / Trev / Cyril Rancid / Police Officer (4 episodes)
- John Brazier as Dracula (4 episodes)
- Rob Jayne as Taxman / Chief librarian / Nigel Rancid / Stately Holmes (3 episodes)
- Timothy Bartlett as Beauregard / Fred / Charlie Thunder (3 episodes)
- Brian Sergent as Utmore / Merv (2 episodes)
- David Copeland as Rattycliffe / Little police officer (2 episodes)
- Michael Wilson as Langton (1 episode)
- Chis Dillon as Sorehead Groucher (1 episode)
- Danny Boone as Crabby Groucher (1 episode)
- Ilona Rodgers as Aunt Menace (1 episode)
- Sharon Tyrrell as Supertax girl (1 episode)
- Ross Jolly as Dr Wantsome (1 episode)

== Episodes ==
No.	Title	Original release date
1	"The House"	3 April 1986
A second hand car dealer who is really a pirate on the inside seeks to sell his house to pursue a life on the sea. Meanwhile, musician mother Petunia and daughters Polly and Patch want to stop living a hectic life on a land yacht travelling perpetually on the motorway and want to buy the house. The Grouchers are also interested in the house.
2	"The Neighbour"	10 April 1986
Branchy, the neighbor who snuck into the next door tree while the storyteller wasn't looking, is renovating the tree into a treehouse. He gets an unexpected visit from his 3 sons (Beauregard, Utmore and Rattycliffe) who will eat him out of house and tree. Petunia, Polly, and Patch need to figure out a way to get rid of the 3 nuisance sons.
3	"Bookkeeping"	17 April 1986
In the middle of writing a song, Petunia gets a demand for $10,000 in income tax and contact the A Greenleaf tax agency to send the wonder accountant Super Tax Girl. Meanwhile, the city library tries to reclaim the book Branchy refuses to relinquish by calling out the library task force.
4	"A House for Mum"	24 April 1986
Petunia's attempts at cooking a family recipe make bread too hard to eat. Ted and Fred the chainsaw brothers keep cutting apart the tents they live in with her mother. They seek to build a house for her and Branchy's tree is in their sights.
5	"Aunt Menace comes to stay"	1 May 1986
Aunt Menace the sheriff of rattlesnake with her dangerous finger guns comes to visit. The Rancid Gang (Cyril, Stinky, and Rhythmic Nigel) bring hired hitman Charlie Thunder to get revenge on Aunt Menace.
6	"Burglary"	8 May 1986
An overnight burglary at the house by Burton the Burglar finds many of Petunia's songs missing. The famous detectives Stately Holmes and Dr. Wantsome show up to help Petunia, Patch, and Polly. The motorcycle police send a clumsy unicycle rookie, who takes a fancy to Petunia.
