= Eye of the Storm (TV series) =

British television series

- Genre: Fantasy; Drama; Thriller
- Written by: Richard Cooper
- Directed by: Peter Tabern
- Starring: Bill Nighy; Cordelia Bugeja; Judy Parfitt
- Music by: Henry Marsh
- Country of origin: United Kingdom
- Original language: English
- No. of seasons: 1
- No. of episodes: 6

Production
- Executive producer: Janie Grace
- Producer: Peter Tabern
- Cinematography: Paul Wheeler
- Editor: Chris Wright
- Running time: 25 minutes
- Production company: Childsplay Productions

Original release
- Network: ITV (CITV)
- Release: 8 January – 12 February 1993

Eye of the Storm is a British fantasy children's television serial first broadcast in early 1993 on ITV. Made by Childsplay Productions and writer Richard Cooper for then-new ITV franchise Meridian Broadcasting, the six-part drama was among its first contributions to the Children's ITV strand. It starred Bill Nighy, Judy Parfitt, and Cordelia Bugeja.

Set on location in Devon and Hampshire on the south coast of England, a conservationist father and daughter investigate what transpires to be a government cover-up of an imminent pollution crisis from their converted trawler boat. Their efforts collide with a more fantastical threat, involving a malevolent guardian's abuse of clairvoyant abilities held by her blind young boy, and his link to ancient powers foretold by a 17th century alchemist forefather.

The serial was a critically acclaimed, award-winning success at the time of its original broadcast, though would remain self-contained and receive no subsequent continuation or adaption in any form. With the exception of one repeat run the following year, Eye of the Storm has not been made commercially available in full for public viewing since.

== Overview ==
Former popstar-turned-environmental conservationist Tom Frewen lives at sea on the south coast of England alongside his teenage daughter Nell, regularly observing it from their eponymous trawler boat home, the 'Eye of the Storm'. Docking at Montliskeard Bay in Devon, they investigate its connection to an incident that took place during the great storm of 1987, where a ship bound for Felixstowe shedded five drums of highly toxic material. Though four of the discarded canisters were recovered, the fifth appears to remain lost. Its major hazard to marine life concerns Tom, swiftly beginning a search for the whereabouts of the barrel. With their boat then wrecked and Nell attacked whilst diving, the two have their lives threatened at the epicenter of a cover-up by governmental authorities.

At the same time, a blind young boy, Luke Montliskeard, is being drugged and abused at Montliskeard Place mansion on the nearby bay cliffs by his malevolent guardian Martha. She desires to create another ecological crisis through this exploitation; one of Luke's alchemist 17th century forefathers, Gilbert, believed that bringing five of his family's jewels together would grant ancient destructive powers. However, before he was able to gather all of them, they were scattered by relatives upon the discovery of his ill intent. Martha tries to find the stones by tracking down Montliskeard descendants and manipulating Luke's extraordinary clairvoyant visions of events he was not present for, intending to summon the destruction in a cave ritual, but has her plans thwarted when the Frewens' efforts collide.

== Production and broadcast ==
In preparation for the on-air launch of Meridian Broadcasting as an ITV station, the then-new franchise holder’s controller of children’s and daytime programming Janie Grace (formerly of predecessor Television South) bought three shows by independent production companies for the former audience during 1992. Each were intended to cover a different segment of the network’s youth remit; of these, Eye of the Storm was seen as Meridian’s drama contribution for its older end.

Made for Meridian by independent television production company Childsplay Productions, the series was devised by Peter Tabern and Richard Cooper. As head of Childsplay since its 1984 inception, the former had left Thames Television to make several series of teenage courier drama Streetwise for TVS and sitcom All Change for Yorkshire Television through it, whereas the latter had moved from theatre to television over a decade prior, predominantly writing several other critically acclaimed thriller serials for youths. These included Quest of Eagles for Tyne Tees, Codename Icarus for the BBC, and Knights of God, also for TVS.

Eye of the Storm was solely produced and directed by Tabern, with Cooper similarly credited for all writing. Its budget was reported to be £1 million. Principal photography took place on-location off the coasts of Devon and Hampshire. Due to numerous action scenes taking place in the sea, a diving consultant was used to choreograph sequences in which actors were underwater. Several of these featured Cordelia Bugeja, in her first lead television role. Kristopher Milnes also made one of his first major on-screen appearances, after voice actor work and recently portraying a younger Scrooge in The Muppet Christmas Carol.

Bill Nighy and Judy Parfitt were cast as Bugeja and Milnes' supporting adult leads, respectively. When approached for his role, Nighy readily accepted it with delight, as he had desired to star in a television production that his young nine-year-old daughter Mary Nighy could watch following the recent adult successes of The Men's Room. In subsequent interviews, he would state that he also personally thought the series' story was "a really good adventure yarn".

As part of the inaugural First Night on Meridian programme broadcast only by the station itself on the evening of its first day on-air (New Year's Day 1993), short preview scenes of Eye of the Storm were presented by Michael Palin and Neil Buchanan. These were shown alongside previews of Zzzap!, a production made by Buchanan for younger children, and Wizadora for pre-school infants, showcasing the full range of Meridian’s first offerings for youth audiences.

Eye of the Storm premiered on 8 January 1993. All six parts of the series were broadcast across the United Kingdom through ITV and shown at 4:40pm on Fridays, during the network's Children's ITV programming block. The final episode was notably the last programme to be linked on the strand by an in-vision host, Glenn Kinsey, from Central’s former Broad Street, Birmingham base, until the later reintroduction of live in-vision presentation at the newer Gas Street Studios in 1998. Outside of the UK, Eye of the Storm was distributed by Link Entertainment; the series was additionally broadcast in Australia a number of times by ABC, and on pay television by Nickelodeon (originally Max) throughout the 1990s, as well as in Germany under the name of Der Fluch der Edelsteine on ZDF during 1994.

== Cast and characters ==
- Bill Nighy as Tom Frewen
- Cordelia Bugeja as Nell Frewen
- Judy Parfitt as Martha Tabbert
- Kristopher Milnes as Luke Montliskeard
- John McGlynn as Runceford/Erlingham
- Felipe Izquierdo as Rob Appleton
- Deborah Poplett as Fran Tuett
- Philip McGough as Henry Price
- Michael Feast as Tiarks
- Tony Bluto as Howie
- Mark Tandy as Barnes
- Neil Clark as Doctor
- Granville Saxton as Gilbert Montliskeard
- Terence Bayler as James Montliskeard
- Richard Dixon as Matthew Montliskeard
- Gabrielle Cowburn as Cheryl
- Jeannie Crowther as Florrie
- Geoffrey McGivern as Customs Officer

== Episodes ==
No.	Title	Directed by	Written by	Original release date
1	"Part 1"	Peter Tabern	Richard Cooper	8 January 1993
Tom Frewen and his daughter Nell patrol the Devon coastline, operating an ecology watch from their converted trawler. They dock in Montliskeard Bay to investigate a 1987 incident in which a boat shedded five barrels of highly toxic material - one still lost. Tom observes local seawater samples, and Nell sees a blind young boy, Luke, on the cliffs, whose clairvoyant visions of past events are exploited by Martha, his malevolent guardian.
2	"Part 2"	Peter Tabern	Richard Cooper	15 January 1993
Tom seeks out Fran Tuett, a local television news reporter, to help him locate the missing barrel of toxic waste. They believe it to be somewhere on the coast. Nell learns more about Luke, and dives alone into the underwater caves against her father’s advice; she is trapped and attacked from behind by another diver. Between both Martha’s abuse and his sudden visions of the attack on Nell, Luke becomes increasingly disturbed.
3	"Part 3"	Peter Tabern	Richard Cooper	22 January 1993
Nell manages to escape the unknown diver’s attempted drowning, as questions are raised over their identity and the Frewens’ safety in the area. Martha tracks down the last of the Montliskeard descendants, keepers of the stones. Fears of authority interference with Nell and Tom’s investigation into the barrel mount further when their trawler boat base is suddenly held under ship arrest over supposed drug-trafficking activities.
4	"Part 4"	Peter Tabern	Richard Cooper	29 January 1993
Martha's evil plans edge closer to completion when the gem holders arrive in Montliskeard Bay, however one of them, Rob Appleton, goes rouge and agrees to try and help Luke. Tom and Nell face danger again as they meet a wolf in ‘green’ clothing.
5	"Part 5"	Peter Tabern	Richard Cooper	5 February 1993
Tom and Nell discover Rob smashed up on the boat. In spite of the previous attempt on her life, Nell goes diving once more in search of an apparent ghost sighted in the sea. Meanwhile, up at Montliskeard Place, Barnes falls foul of Martha.
6	"Part 6"	Peter Tabern	Richard Cooper	12 February 1993
Martha is closer than ever to achieving her evil goal, as Rob and Fran’s attempt to stop her sees them held prisoner. Nell launches a desperate last-ditch bid to rescue Luke from the cave and prevent Martha’s ceremony from unleashing destruction.

== Critical response and legacy ==
On original broadcast, Eye of the Storm was broadly seen to be a success. Writer and developer Richard Cooper received a Writer's Guild Award for his work on the programme; he would later appear with the award and Fred Dineage during a segment in Meridian, The First Year, a television special looking back on the highlights of the station’s initial 12 months on-air. Alongside earlier excerpts of praise from the Times Educational Supplement read out by Dineage and a brief clip, Cooper credited the actors and Childsplay Productions, whom he would work with once more on their BBC adaption of Children of the New Forest before his 1998 passing.

Despite the series' overall positive reception at the time and a suggestion in a report on Meridian by The Stage that it could receive another run of episodes, then-controller of ITV children's programming Dawn Airey would dictate a shift away from most productions for the older end of the youth audience, citing a research-led belief that it was in decline and cancelling other popular series such as Knightmare in the process. Subsequently, Eye of the Storm did not receive any continuation. It saw one repeat run on CITV during July and August of the following year, and has not been broadcast or commercially released in full since. As of 2022, a recording of its second episode is currently available for viewing at BFI Mediatheque Southbank. Alongside subsequent Childsplay production Pirates, worldwide distribution rights of the series were under Entertainment Rights during the 2000s following their purchase of Link Entertainment.

Eye of the Storm has seen less critical recognition over time, and unfavourable comparisons have been drawn in retrospect between it and another ecologically focused Childsplay production, Life Force, in spite of its more controversial reception on initial airings in 2000. Writing for the BFI in The Hill and Beyond: Children's Television Drama, former Doctor Who Magazine journalist Alistair McGown perceived the serial to rely heavily on tension at the expense of strong character development, an aspect he believed to have potential. Though feeling that they "worked reasonably well in their own right" and made use of effective action scenes, McGown also argued that its two plot strands of environmental concern and fantasy did not gel together, combining in a climax deemed to be "almost contrived".
