= 1963 New Year Honours (New Zealand) =

Annual awards for New Zealanders

The 1963 New Year Honours in New Zealand were appointments by Elizabeth II on the advice of the New Zealand government to various orders and honours to reward and highlight good works by New Zealanders. The awards celebrated the passing of 1962 and the beginning of 1963, and were announced on 1 January 1963.

The recipients of honours are displayed here as they were styled before their new honour.

== Knight Bachelor ==
- Henry Joseph Kelliher – of Auckland. For public and philanthropic services.
- The Honourable Alexander Kingcome Turner – a judge of the New Zealand Court of Appeal.

== Order of Saint Michael and Saint George ==
=== Knight Commander (KCMG) ===
- His Excellency the Honourable Thomas Lachlan MacDonald – high commissioner for New Zealand in London.
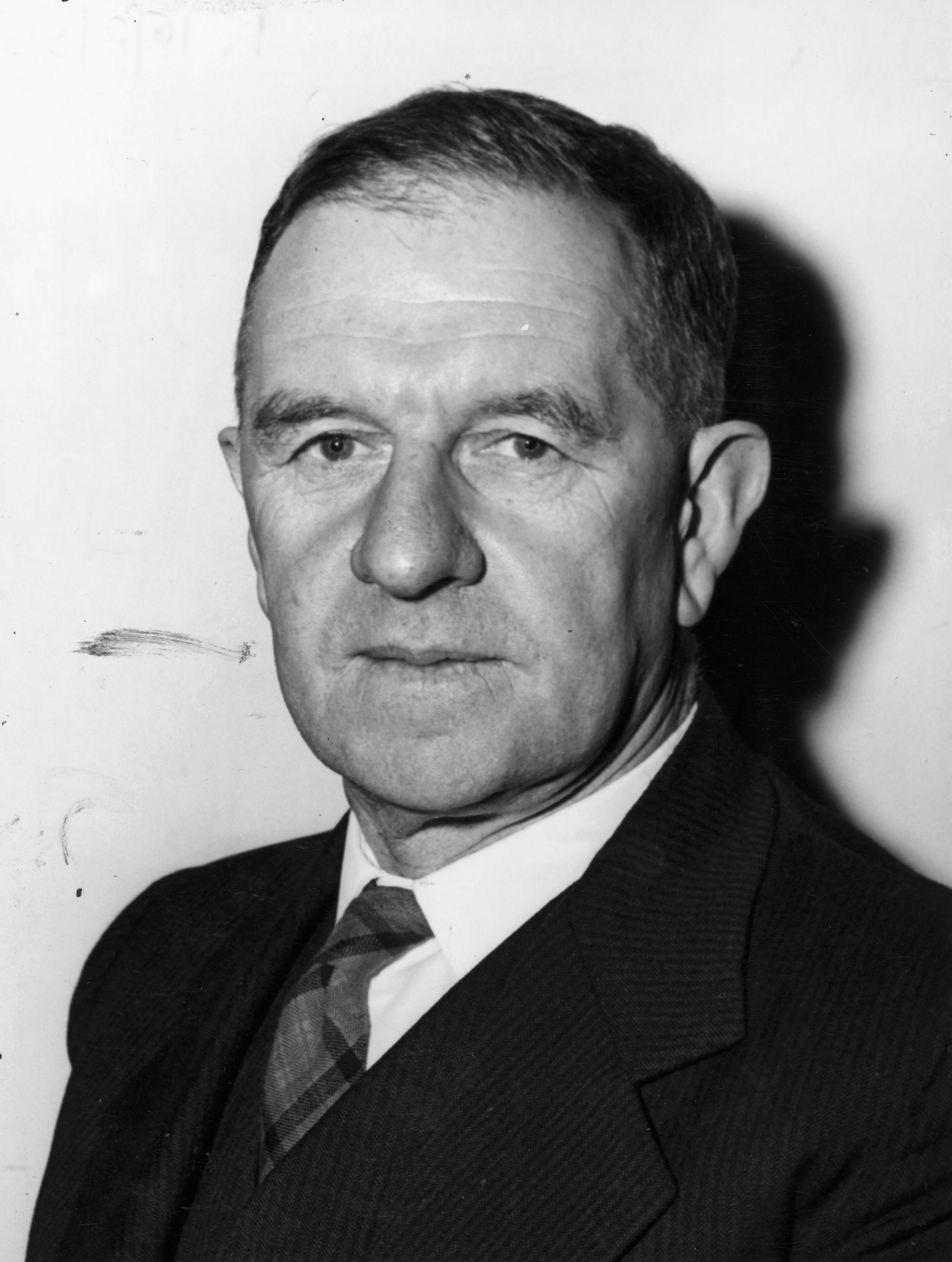
Sir Tom Macdonald

=== Companion (CMG) ===
- Leonard Allan Atkinson – chairman of the Public Service Commission.
- Duncan McFadyen Rae – New Zealand consul-general in Indonesia.

== Order of the British Empire ==
=== Commander (CBE) ===
Civil division

- Hubert Reynolds Bach – city engineer, Lower Hutt, and chief engineer to the Hutt Drainage Board.
- George Jobberns – professor emeritus of geography, University of Canterbury.
- Alexander Hare McLintock – historian, New Zealand Parliament.
- James Wattie – of Hastings. For services to the processed food industry.

Military division

- Brigadier Tom Bassett Morten DSO OBE ED – Royal New Zealand Infantry Corps (Territorial Force).

=== Officer (OBE) ===
Civil division

- Thomas Augustus Bishop MM JP – of Auckland. For services to local government.
- David Brown JP – of Invercargill. For services to farming and local government.
- Eileen Marjorie Fosbery Chambers – matron-in-chief, Christchurch Hospital.
- Leonard le Fleming Ensor ED – of Auckland. For services to education.
- John Richard Lloyd Hammond JP – chairman of the Rangitikei County Council.
- John Colin Lucas JP – town clerk, Dunedin.
- Hamiora Wiremu Maioha – of Russell. For services to the Māori people.
- Terence Mortimer McKewen JP – of Wellington. For services to local government.
- Leslie Vaughan Phillips – chairman of the New Zealand Milk Board.
- Paul Lancelot Porter – of Heretaunga. For public services.

Military division

- Commander John Bernard Smith VRD – Royal New Zealand Naval Volunteer Reserve.
- Lieutenant-Colonel Robert [sic] Hugh Ferguson Holloway – Royal Regiment of New Zealand Artillery (Regular Force).
- Group Captain John Donovan Robins DFC – Royal New Zealand Air Force.

=== Member (MBE) ===
Civil division

- George Frederick Charles Ashdowne – manager of a branch in Christchurch of the New Zealand Foundation for the Blind.
- Lily Brant JP – of Hamilton. For social welfare services.
- The Reverend John Lawley Brown – of the Flying Angel Mission to Seamen, Auckland.
- Oswald Henry Coleman JP – a member of the Rotorua Borough Council.
- Anthony Edward Joseph Corr JP – of Moerewa. For services in community affairs.
- John Davidson JP – mayor of Ashburton.
- Janet Hogg Davie – of New Plymouth. For community services, especially in connection with the Young Women's Christian Association.
- Herbert James Dewe – mayor of Feilding.
- Olive Lilian Haldane JP – of Bainham. For services to the community, especially in the field of women's and children's social welfare.
- Captain Frederick Patrick Ladd. For services to the people of Waiheke Island and other areas in the Hauraki Gulf in connection with rescue work and transport of the sick.
- Sister Mary Leo (Kathleen Niccol) – St Mary's Convent, Auckland. For services to music.
- Amiria Miriama Logan – Dominion president of the Māori Women's Welfare League.
- Rosa Josephine Reynolds – organiser and honorary custodian, historical exhibition, Canterbury Museum.
- James Herford Saunderson JP – of Picton. For services to local government and farming.
- Betty Mary Lillias Thomas JP – of Pukekohe. For social welfare services.
- Robert Henry Traill. For services to the community in Stewart Island.
- Bessie Margaret Walmsley – of Invercargill. For social welfare services.
- Mimie Wood – secretary of the Royal Society of New Zealand.

Military division

- Lieutenant-Commander John Graham Williamson – Royal New Zealand Navy.
- Major Michael Ralph Kennedy – New Zealand Regiment (Regular Force).
- Lieutenant-Colonel (temporary) John Mills Mabbett – Royal New Zealand Army Service Corps (Regular Force).
- Warrant Officer First Class Henry Thomas McLardy – New Zealand Regiment (Regular Force).
- Major Jack Lewis Ryan – Royal New Zealand Infantry Corps (Territorial Force).
- Flight Lieutenant John William Noble BEM – Royal New Zealand Air Force.
- Flight Lieutenant Kenneth Alfred Sidney Pipe DFC – Royal New Zealand Air Force.
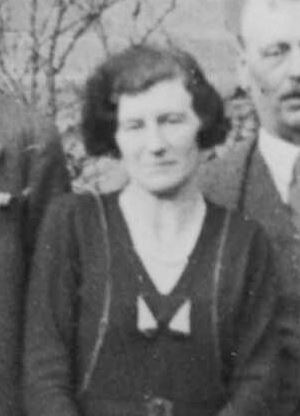
Mimie Wood

== British Empire Medal (BEM) ==
Civil division, for gallantry

- Donald Patrick Pomeroy – constable, New Zealand Police Force. For courage in attempting to arrest three criminals.

Military division

- Chief Electrician Albert Bernard Carpenter – Royal New Zealand Navy.
- Chief Petty Officer Owen Leslie Clotworthy – Royal New Zealand Navy.
- Petty Officer Cook (S) Rex Harold Helleur – Royal New Zealand Navy.
- Chief Petty Officer Frederick Maxwell Jacobs – Royal New Zealand Navy.
- Sergeant (temporary) Girvan Ross Hornbrook – New Zealand Regiment (Regular Force).
- Sergeant Ross Mark Jones – Royal New Zealand Corps of Signals (Regular Force).
- Sergeant (acting) Richard John Kelly – New Zealand Regiment (Regular Force).
- Staff-Sergeant Neale Eden William Smith EM – Royal New Zealand Army Service Corps (Territorial Force).
- Corporal Clive Gemmell Rae – Royal New Zealand Air Force.
- Corporal William Richardson – Royal New Zealand Air Force.

== Bar to Air Force Cross ==
- Squadron Leader Gordon Harry Saywell Tosland AFC – Royal New Zealand Air Force.

== Air Force Cross (AFC) ==
- Squadron Leader Ian Murray Gillard – Royal New Zealand Air Force.

== Queen's Fire Services Medal (QFSM) ==
- Russell Preston – chief fire officer, North Shore Fire Brigade, Takapuna, Auckland.
- Leslie Osborne Wallis – fireman, Gore Volunteer Fire Brigade.

== Queen's Police Medal (QPM) ==
- Macdonald Brown – chief superintendent, New Zealand Police Force.

== Queen's Commendation for Valuable Service in the Air ==
- Flight Lieutenant Alan Roy Bleakley – Royal New Zealand Air Force.
- Flight Lieutenant Alan Dyer – Royal New Zealand Air Force.
- Flight Lieutenant Mervyn William Hodge – Royal New Zealand Air Force.
