= Pioneer Women (TV series) =

1983-90 New Zealand television series

- Written by: Julian Dickon; Bob Leamen
- Narrated by: Glenis Levestam
- Composer: Clive Cockburn
- Country of origin: New Zealand
- Original language: English
- No. of seasons: 2
- No. of episodes: 9

Production
- Producers: Pamela Jones; Pamela Meekings-Stewart
- Running time: 25 minutes

Original release
- Release: May 17, 1983 – June 3, 1990

Pioneer Women is a 1983 New Zealand television series. It featured dramatised documentaries of pioneering women in New Zealand. Its first series was six episodes beginning in May on Television One at 8:00pm. A second three episode series began in May 1990 on One at 9:25pm.

== Episodes ==
Season 1

- Nurse Maude

Writer: Jane Galletly. Director: Catherine de Nave

Nurse Sibylla Maude, played by Barbara Ewing, quit her job at the Christchurch Hospital after disagreements with the management and started nursing the poor resulting in the formation of the District Nursing Association.

- Hera Ngoungou

Writer: Jane Galletly. Director: Pamela Jones

Hera Ngoungou (born Caroline Perrett), played by Ginette McDonald, was kidnapped by Maoris as a child and raised as one of the tribe.

- Ellen Anne Hewett

Writer: Jane Galletly. Director: Catherine de Nave

Ellen Anne Hewett, played by Phillipa Dann, was widowed with children at age 21. She then devoted herself to spreading the gospel.

- Princess Te Puea

Writer: Jane Galletly and Wharetoa Kerr. Director: Ken Sudell

Princess Te Puea, played by Joanna Paul, was a Maori leader and the niece of the Maori King Mahuta. He enlisted her help to strengthen their people after the Land Wars.

- Elizabeth Colenso

Writer: Jane Galletly. Director: Ken Sudell

Elizabeth Colenso, played by Elizabeth Fran Kelly, opened and ran a Mission with her husband who was often away leaving her in charge.

- Ettie Rout

Writer: Jane Galletly. Director: Ginette McDonald

Ettie Rout, played by Jane Waddell, was a fighter for contreception. This episode raised concerns about showing details of venereal disease during "family time" so programmers considered possible cuts or moving it to a different time slot. It ended up being broadcast, without cuts, on Two at the later slot of 8:30pm.

Season 2

- Mother Aubert

Director: Pamela Meekings-Stewart

Mother Aubert, played by Linda Burnett, was an missionary from France who founded the Daughters of our Lady of Compassion.

- Mabel Howard

Director: Pamela Meekings-Stewart

Mabel Howard, played by Ann Pacey, was New Zealands first female Cabinet Minister.

- Aunt Daisy

Writer: Julia Millen. Director: Pamela Meeking-Stewart

Aunt Daisy, played by Susan Wilson, was an early radio presenter.

== Awards ==
Feltex Television Awards 1983

- Best Actress - Ginette McDonald for Pioneer Women - won
- Best Drama - Pioneer Women, Pamela Jones - won
