= The Crew (2008 film) =

2008 film

- UK DVD Cover
- Directed by: Adrian Vitoria
- Written by: Ian Brady (Screenplay); Adrian Vitoria (Screenplay); Kevin Sampson ("Outlaws" novel)
- Produced by: Ian Brady; Emmanuel Girod; Elaine Grainger; David Hayman; Arnaud Lannic; Julien Leonard; Sarah Peters; Rafael Quintian; Stephen Salter
- Starring: Scot Williams; Kenny Doughty; Rory McCann; Stephen Graham
- Cinematography: Mark Hamilton
- Music by: James Edward Barker
- Release date: October 2008 (United Kingdom)
- Running time: 118 minutes
- Language: English
- Budget: US$3,600,000 (estimated)

The Crew is a 2008 British crime film based on the 2001 novel Outlaws by Kevin Sampson. It is set in the criminal underworld of Northern England especially Liverpool, Merseyside.

== Plot ==
Gerard (Ged) Brennan and his crew are hijacking a truck, only to find it is a dummy truck that is empty to ward off hijackers for that very purpose. The next morning, the radio news announces that a "businessman" named Leo Murphy, aka Leo the Pig, is found naked and killed on a boat out at sea. Even though the truck heist was a dud, Ged still has to pay his crew so that they don't go work for other competitors; this causes a strain on his marriage with his wife Debbie. Their young son is unaware of what his father does for a living, wanting to go to "work" with his dad. When Ged goes to drop off his son at a private school, their neighbor, Pamela Thompson, comes over. Pam and Deb do lines of cocaine at the house when Ged leaves; after Ged drops off his son, he drives to a desolated area where there are businesspeople standing around. Pam's husband, Keith Thompson, is trying to get investors for a land deal, and Ged is one of the investors, but he has to front up the money to buy shares of the land; which he does not have all upfront. He gives Keith a down payment to hold a piece of the share for him, telling him that he'll get the rest soon.

John Paul, aka Ratter (Kenny Doughty), is pulling up to the crew's bar with his new lackey, Paul the Hom, who has small connections with the drug world. Outside the bar area are a group of wanna-be thugs, with a young kid, Ritchie, as the leader. They do little side jobs for the crews and others, and know bits and pieces of info here and there about the crime world. Ratter is Ged's younger brother; and he and Paul wants to take the crew into a new business venture, drugs. Ratter brought Paul along as a get-up to convince the crew to take over Leo's business turf, especially Ged, who is the crew's boss. When Paul starts talking about how much money they could make, the crew gets interested, but when Ged arrives and Paul and Ratter tries to pitch the sale to Ged, he doesn't buy into it. Ged is old-school when it comes to his crimes, and he won't mix in with the drug business because he knows that drugs is always the most riskiest of crimes; people always get caught or end up dead. Ged won't have anything to do with drugs, and throws Paul out of the bar. He wants to just stick with his truck heists, and he displays his disappointment in Ratter.

Ged meets up with Jimmy, the driver that was in the dummy truck. Jimmy provides info to Ged about his truck routes and shipments and gets a cut in on the deal. Jimmy's truck company is unaware because Ged and his crew always makes the robbery authentic, even knocking out Jimmy and his co-driver. Jimmy tells Ged that there will be three shipments going out soon from his company, the new PlayStations, about 20-30 thousand of them per truck. They decide to let the first two shipments go so that the company won't be alerted, and to rob the third and last shipment. Jimmy gives Ged all the info; routes, times, destination, etc. He also warns Ged that these shipments will all have GPS on them, and that they will have about ten minutes to carry out the heist before the company calls it in. Jimmy tells Ged that since this is a huge heist that he's giving to Ged and his crew, that he wants to be square away with him, and that he wants out after this last heist. Ged tells him that if the heist goes good, he'll think about it, as Ged, too, wants to get out of the game.

At a barbecue that is being hosted by Ged and Debbie at their home, the whole crew is there with their wives and children. Ged tells the crew about the PlayStation job; and also informs the crew that Franner (Francis), is looking for who killed Leo, as well as hosting Leo's funeral. Franner is apparently a big-time crime boss, on top of the underworld game, and Leo was one of his big guys in the business. Pam and Keith arrive at the party as well, on the invitation of Deb. Ged is distressed about this, as he doesn't want Keith and Pam, who appears to be legit businesspeople, to mix in with the crew. However, an intoxicated Ratter, upon talking to Keith, finds out about Ged's land investment. This leads to tension, with Keith and his wife leaving the party after only being there for a few minutes. They invite Ged and his wife to a party at their house that they're having next week before they leave. Ratter confronts Ged about his land deal that he has on the side that he's keeping from the crew, and after much taunting, Ged knocks out Ratter.

Mobey, a member of the Brennan crew, has his son's communion coming up that he and his wife are preparing for, and annoys the crew with reminders for them to attend. The communion is on the 20th day of the month. Mobey visits a gentlemen's club frequently, that is owned by a Serbian criminal that is in the drug business, Lepi. Mobey has an outstanding tab at the club for 900 pounds, and Lepi's man, Dusan, brings it up to Mobey's attention. Ratter and Paul are also in the club, because they want to land a deal with Lepi to take over Leo's business; which Lepi was Leo's biggest customer. Instead of the supplier dealing directly with the customer, they want to be the middleman, which was what Leo was. However, they need Lepi to front up the money for them to buy the drugs from the supplier, which is the "Irishman", Dermot. Ratter tries to get a business trade for the front-money by telling Lepi about the PlayStation job; but when Lepi finds out that his brother, Ged, isn't okay with the drug deal, Lepi doesn't want to do business. However, even without Lepi in on it, Ratter is sure that he can get him on board later on, and tells Paul to set up a meeting with the Irishman anyway. As Paul and Ratter are leaving, they see Mobey there. Mobey tells the two to forget about the whole drug deal because Ged is against it, and they pretend as if they have.

Ratter and Paul drive to a warehouse, where Ratter meets with the Irishman, the drug supplier. He asks Ratter if Franner knows about this, and Ratter reassures him that he will talk to Franner and that he'll get the okay. The Irishman tells Ratter that Leo's business was a big deal to handle, and that if he knows how to work the business then he'll go in on it, but that it's money upfront, and to talk to Franner first.

Meanwhile, Franner and his man are going around the area asking Ged and his crew if they know anything about Leo's death, as well as asking Ritchie and his young crew what they know - everyone tells Franner that they are hearing that it's the Serb gang that did it. Franner tells his man to keep an eye on Ritchie; which Ritchie informs Franner about the PlayStation heist coming up, because he gets paid by Franner for info.

Mobey gets beat up by Lepi's man, Dusan, at the club over the 900 pound tab that is still outstanding, and Ged gets a call about it when he's at the Thompson's party. Deb is upset over the loyal attention that Ged has to give the crew, and when he leaves to go see Mobey, Deb and Pam go upstairs to the bedroom where they snort lines of coke and then have sex with each other. Deb has a lesbian infatuation with Pam, a mix from the cocaine and the alienation she feels from Ged as the crime business seems to be taking its toll on him. Ged goes to Lepi to square away their two men's beef.

Before Ged goes to Lepi's club, Ratter and Paul are there first. They try to make a deal with Lepi again for him to front up the money so that they can get the drugs from the Irishman, the supplier. In return for the upfront money, Ratter tells Lepi that he will give him what he wants - Ged Brennan and his crew. Just then, Dusan tells him that Ged is outside and wants to see him. Paul starts flipping out, worrying that Ged is on to them, and keeps on trying to find a back door exit because Ged is outside the front door. Ratter keeps trying to calm Paul down, who is getting hysterical. Outside, Ged tells Lepi that it ends two ways, either they have an all out war with their crews, or their men go at it one-on-one. Lepi agrees that their men go at it one on one, and they arrange to meet at 8 o'clock in the morning the next day. After Ged leaves, Lepi flips out on Dusan for having Mobey beaten up over a 900-pound tab. He also tells Ratter and Paul to get out, that they don't have a deal with him.

At the funeral that is being hosted by Franner, Mobey is not allowed to drink at all because of his one-on-one fight in the morning with Dusan. Ged even sends him home early so that he can get rest up, but instead Mobey goes to one of the prostitutes that he frequently visits for one of his many fetishes. At the funeral reception, Franner makes it clear that he will find out who killed Leo and that he will avenge his death. Ratter asks Franner for his approval to take over Leo's business, which Franner gives him the okay for; despite asking him if Ged was in also, and Ratter telling him no. Ged sees Franner and Ratter talking and becomes suspicious and weary of the both of them.

Ged picks up Mobey in the morning and they drive out to a dock, where they wait for Lepi and Dusan to show up. Ged asks Mobey if he ever wanted to do anything else, and Mobey confides in him that he wanted to open a pet shop at one time, but that as time went on he gave up that idea. Ged tells him that he's getting out of the business, that the PlayStation is his last job, and then he's getting out. Lepi and his man show up, and then Mobey and Dusan fight their one-on-one, with Mobey winning. After Lepi's man is beaten, with the deal being that the tension is "over" between the two crews after their men fight it out; Lepi calls Ratter to tell him that he'll accept his offer and front him the money.

During Mobey and Dusan's fight, Pam and Keith are at Ged's house. Keith tells Deb that it's the last day for the land investment, and that all of the investors have to have the money in by noon. Deb tries to call Ged, who does not answer his phone because of the fight going on, so instead Deb gives Keith all of their money that they have in the house, which was 108,000 pounds. Deb and Pam goes upstairs to celebrate the deal by having sex and doing lines of coke again. Ged comes home and sees that the safe is empty and wakes up an intoxicated Deb. He is suspicious, and drives over to the Thompson's house, where the whole house is emptied except for a bottle of champagne. Deb and Ged realizes that they were scammed, and that the Thompson's were planning it for months, a wife and husband team that shafted them; clearly something that they are professionals in.

Ged tells Jimmy that he needs to move up the heist and that he's going to take one of the early truck shipments of PlayStations instead of the third one. He moved the date up to the 20th, which is Mobey's son's communion date. Ged gathers his men together to tell them about the new date and apologizes to Ratter about what happened at the barbecue. He then gets a phone call from Franner to meet him.

He meets up with Franner and two of his men in the woods, and they are beating Ritchie, who is nailed to a tree trunk by his hands. Ged tells the men to let Ritchie go. Franner tells Ritchie to tell Ged what he told him, which was that Ratter had him (Ritchie) kill Leo. Ged doesn't believe it and points his gun at Ritchie and then at Franner; which Franner and his men have their guns aimed at Ged as well. Ged is distraught because he knows that Ratter will be killed, and he tells Franner that he saw him give Ratter the nod at the funeral reception, that he gave Ratter the okay; which Franner replies that he gave him the okay for the business, not to kill Leo. Franner then asks Ged if he's his brother's keeper, which Ged remorsely says no. Franner tells Ged that the Serbs will be involved as well, and that it will be a whole big mess. Ged confides to Franner that he has to do the job because he was scammed out of all his money on the "land deal", that he had checked up on Keith and Pamela, and they seemed legit; and he felt that he was losing his touch. Franner asks him who scammed him, and Ged tells him that it was a husband-and-wife team, and the guy went by the name of Keith Thompson. Franner tells Ged again not to do the job, and then leaves him there with Ritchie, for Ged to kill him. Ged is distraught over having to kill Ritchie, especially since Ritchie keeps pleading with him, telling him that he's just a young kid; but Ged has to kill him because he was the one that killed Leo, and Franner is going to kill Ratter.

On the 20th, Ged and his men wait for Jimmy's truck, which is a last-minute change for the crew. Everyone is there except for Ratter, and Ged tells one of his guys, George, that Ratter isn't coming. In flashbacks, it shows Ged and Jimmy planning out the heist, and Jimmy telling Ged that the truck company will be sending out dummy trucks as well. Ged tells Jimmy that he wants all the info on the dummy trucks as well as the shipment trucks. When his crew sees Jimmy's truck, they hijack it, beating up the co-driver, and knocking out Jimmy after they open the trailer, which is loaded with PlayStations, to the relief of Ged.

Ratter and Paul go to meet Franner and the Irishman. When they are all standing before each other, Franner confronts Ratter about Leo's death, which Paul panics and runs, but the Irishman shoots him dead with a sniper rifle, and then Franner shoots Ratter in the head at close range with a pistol. Meanwhile, Franner's men and Lepi and his men are trying to hijack the same truck, which they think is the PlayStation job as they only knew the details from the original information that Ged gave to his crew; which Ratter gave to Lepi, and Ritchie told to Franner, but it turns out to be one of the dummy trucks instead. Franner's men kills all of the Serbian crew, including Lepi, and then Franner's man calls him to tell him that the truck was a dummy.

Franner meets Ged at Mobey's son's communion party, where Franner gives Ged a piece of paper and tells him to take care of himself, knowing that Ged wanted out. The piece of paper is information to the location of "Keith and Pamela". The movie ends with Keith and Pam at a house, in a swimming pool, and Ged walking down a pathway with a gun heading towards the house - presumably to kill them.

== Cast ==
- Scot Williams as Ged Brennan
- Kenny Doughty as Ratter
- Rory McCann as Moby
- Stephen Graham as Franner
- Cordelia Bugeja as Debs
- Mem Ferda as Dusan
- Philip Olivier as Paul the Hom
- Mike Dolan as Lucas
- Darren Whitfield as Walker
- James Boylan as man number one

== Home media ==
The film was released on Region 2 DVD on 12 January 2009. Its special features included a commentary, two documentaries, deleted scenes, and two music videos.
