= Space Knights (TV series) =

- Created by: Jonathan Gunson
- Written by: Arthur Baysting; Charlie Strachan; Jonathan Gunson; Martin Howells; Alan Trussell-Cullen; Ken Catran
- Directed by: Chris Bailey; Steve Mann
- Starring: David Cameron; Scott Harman; Ginette McDonald
- Opening theme: Dave Dobbyn
- Country of origin: New Zealand
- Original language: English
- No. of seasons: 1
- No. of episodes: 22

Production
- Executive producers: Des Monaghan; Don Reynolds
- Producers: Ross Jennings; Gerben Cath
- Editor: Davis Coulson
- Running time: 25 minutes
- Production company: South Pacific Pictures

Original release
- Release: July 15 – December 16, 1989

Space Knights is a 1989 New Zealand children's television series created by Jonathan Gunson.

Space Knights was the story of King Arthur set in space and using puppets. The puppets were created by a team led by Chris Slane. There was two versions of the heads, one worn by actors and one for puppets. The series theme song "Space Junk" was created by Dave Dobbyn and featured Bruce Lynch, Annie Crummer and Suzanne Lynch. It was credited to Dave Dobbyn & The Lunettes and it reach number 32 on the New Zealand singles chart.

== Cast ==
- David Cameron as Sir Cedric Space
- Ginette McDonald as Lady Guinevere Galaxy
- Jon Finlayson as Sir Ralph Retro
- Adrian Wright as Sir Cuthbert Cosmos
- Alistair Douglas as Sir Lancelot De Laser
- Scott Harman as Arthur Asteroid
- Ian Watkin as Mordread Darkvoid / Conrod
- David Ravenswood as Jeevzoid
- Joan Harris as Maggie Mooncrusher
- Roy Baldwin as Penzance Plunderon
- David Letch as Pegleg Proton
- Michael Veitch as Blunderblock
- Fred Parslow as Merlin Stardust

== Episodes ==
1. The Piper of Avalon
2. The Great Siege
3. Entrancing Knights
4. A Jolly Joust
5. The Golden Knight
6. Electro Excalibur
7. The Great Race
8. The Doomroid Bugle
9. Rich Beyond Dreams
10. Doomsday in Avalon
11. The Invisible Pirate
12. The Midas Star
13. The Doom-Lock Keys
14. Double Trouble
15. The Mists of Time
16. A Matter of Honour
17. Skull Duggery
18. Microbes Ahoy
19. The Golden Ghost
20. Magic Malevolence
21. Sir Cuthbert & Mr Hyde
22. Confounded Computers
