= Alexander Turner (jurist) =

New Zealand lawyer, judge (1901–1993)

Sir Alexander Kingcome Turner KBE QC (18 November 1901 – 7 July 1993) was an Auckland-born New Zealand lawyer and judge.

== Early life and family ==
He was one of four children, all sons, born to Joseph Hurst Turner, a teacher, and his wife, Gertrude Kingcome Reid, daughter of a Methodist minister, and attended Mount Eden School and Auckland Grammar School. When he was 11, his father died, leaving the family in genteel poverty.

Turner graduated from Auckland University College (BA, 1921; MA with first-class honours in economics, 1922; LLB, 1923).

He married Dorothea Frances Mulgan (the sister of writer John Mulgan), a writer, critic, Greek scholar, and weaver, in Wellington on 21 March 1934. The couple had three children.

== Legal career ==
As a barrister, notable successes came in two criminal trials, R v Gardner (1932) 51 NZLR 1648 and R v Phillips [1949] NZLR 316, cases where he was able to have confessions procured by the police by threat or inducement excluded from the evidence. These cases are still cited in textbooks on the law of evidence today. In 1952, he was made Queen's Counsel. On 29 June 1953, he was appointed judge of the Supreme Court of New Zealand. After serving on provincial courts he was named senior Auckland judge. On 30 August 1962 he was elevated to the Court of Appeal in Wellington, alongside Sir Alfred North and Sir Thaddeus McCarthy. Turner served as the court's President from 1 February 1972 until his retirement 17 months later.

On retiring from the Court of Appeal, Turner joined the legal publisher Butterworths of New Zealand as a director and editor-in-chief, a post he was active in until shortly before his death. In his 70s and 80s, he updated a series of textbooks originally written by George Spencer Bower in the early years of the 20th century: Actionable Misrepresentation was published in 1974 and by Representation in 1977. The last of these, The Law of Actionable Non-Disclosure (which Turner co-authored with Professor R.J. Sutton) was published in 1990 when Turner was 88.

== Honours ==
He was awarded an honorary LLD by the University of Auckland in 1963. He was appointed a Knight Bachelor in the 1963 New Year Honours, a Privy Councillor in 1968, and a Knight Commander of the Order of the British Empire in the 1973 New Year Honours.

== Death ==
Turner died in Auckland on 7 July 1993, aged 91, survived by his wife and three children.
