= Hamiora Wiremu Maioha =

New Zealand interpreter (1888–1963)

Hamiora Wiremu Maioha, OBE (21 September 1888 – 30 January 1963) was a New Zealand interpreter, farmer and community leader. Of Māori descent, he identified with the Ngāpuhi iwi. He was born in Waimamaku, Northland, New Zealand, on 21 September 1888.

In the 1963 New Year Honours, Maioha was appointed an Officer of the Order of the British Empire, for services to the Māori people.
