= Fred Ladd (aviator) =

New Zealand pilot

Frederick Patrick Ladd OBE (27 October 1908 – 22 January 1989) was a New Zealand carrier, civilian and military pilot, tourism and aviation promoter.

== Biography ==
Ladd was born in Warkworth north of Auckland, New Zealand on 27 October 1908. After time in Auckland and Wellington, the family settled in Hamilton, where he attended Hamilton High School for one year. After a variety of jobs, he joined his father's carrying business in 1925 and took it over the following year after his father's death. He ran the company for 15 years. He was interested in flying, but did not have the means to pay for lessons until 1939. He joined the Royal New Zealand Air Force in 1941 and graduated as a pilot in the following year. During World War II, he flew 33 missions in the Pacific.

Ladd started flying the Dunedin–Invercargill route for the New Zealand National Airways Corporation in 1948. With a strong entrepreneurial streak, he was the first Chief Pilot for Fiji Airways (1951–1954), before running his own company for 13 years, Tourist Air Travel, in the Hauraki Gulf. During that time, he became a household name in New Zealand, and was known for his catch phrases like "a shower of spray and we're away" for taking off in his Widgeon, an amphibious aircraft. On his last day as a tourist operator in 1967, he flew his Widgeon under the Auckland Harbour Bridge and was discharged without conviction for this offence. With over 21,000 hours of flying time, he had his commercial pilot's licence withdrawn by the Civil Aviation Authority in 1977 over age concerns. Ladd embarked on a fitness campaign for regaining his licence and set a national swimming record in the over 70 category, but was unsuccessful. In December 1983, he commenced gliding.

In the 1963 New Year Honours, Ladd was appointed a Member of the Order of the British Empire, for services to the people of Waiheke Island and other areas in the Hauraki Gulf in connection with rescue work and transport of the sick. He was promoted to Officer of the same order in the 1976 Queen's Birthday Honours, for services to the tourist and aviation industries.

Ladd died of cancer on 22 January 1989 at Taupō, survived by his wife and daughter. His ashes were buried in Taupo Public Cemetery.
