= Joel Abraham =

New Zealand cricketer (born 1989)

Personal information
- Full name: Joel Koshy Abraham
- Born: 13 July 1989 (age 37); Changanacherry, Kerala, India
- Batting: Right-handed
- Bowling: Right-arm leg break and googly

Domestic team information
- Years: Team
- 2010/11: Canterbury
- Only FC: 29 November 2011 Canterbury v Northern Districts
- Only LA: 25 November 2011 Canterbury v Central Districts

Career statistics
Competition	First-class	List A
Matches	1	1
Runs scored	28	0
Batting average	14	0
100s/50s	0/0	0/0
Top score	27	0
Catches/stumpings	0/–	0/–
- Source: CricketArchive, 25 June 2016

Joel Koshy Abraham (born 13 July 1989) is a New Zealand cricketer who played one first-class and one List A match for Canterbury during the 2011–12 season.

Born at Changanacherry in Kerala in India, Abraham played age-group cricket for Canterbury sides from the 2004–05 season and the Canterbury A side from 2011 to 2012. He was one of Canterbury under-23s leading run scorers in 2010–11, and played club cricket in England during 2011, setting an East Anglian Premier League record score of 221 runs whilst playing for Swardeston Cricket Club. He made his senior representative debut in a List A match against Central Districts in November 2011, going on to make his first-class debut against Northern Districts later the same month.

Despite his promise as a batsman, these were Abraham's only senior appearances for the Canterbury side. He played A team cricket until the end of the 2015–16 season and played for a Canterbury XI against Scotland in 2014–15 whilst studying commerce at university.
