= Brady Barnett =

New Zealand cricketer (born 1989)

Personal information
- Full name: Brady James Barnett
- Born: 18 November 1989 (age 36); Motueka, New Zealand

Domestic team information
- Years: Team
- 2011/12: Central Districts
- 2014/15: Wellington
- 2015: VRA Amsterdam
- Source: Cricinfo, 4 October 2024

Brady Barnett (born 18 November 1989) is a New Zealand former first-class cricketer who played for Wellington and Central Districts.

== Career ==
Barnett played for Nelson, Saintfield and in the Netherlands for VRA Amsterdam in 2015. In 2020 he was a coach for the Tararua Kotahi womans team in the Central Districts Cricket Association. He coached Nelson between 2021 and 2023 and then moved to work as a coach for Queensland Cricket.
