= Izaac Williams =

New Zealand basketball player

Personal information
- Born: 13 October 1989 (age 37) Invercargill, New Zealand
- Listed height: 188 cm (6 ft 2 in)
- Listed weight: 85 kg (187 lb)

Career information
- High school: Southland Boys' (Invercargill, New Zealand)
- Playing career: 2010–present
- Position: Guard

Career history
- 2010–2011: Southland Sharks

Izaac Williams (born 13 October 1989) is a New Zealand professional basketball player for the Southland Sharks of the National Basketball League (NBL). Born in Invercargill, Southland, Williams had a promising career in squash before turning to basketball.

Williams was part of the Southland Sharks squad in 2010 and 2011. On debut for the Sharks, he recorded four points, one assist and one steal in an 80–63 win over the Otago Nuggets.

Williams returned to the Sharks squad for the 2016 New Zealand NBL season, but did not appear in any games for the team.
