= Karl Bryson =

- Born: 20 March 1989 (age 37) New Zealand
- Height: 1.75 m (5 ft 9 in)
- Weight: 83 kg (183 lb)
- School: Palmerston North Boys High School

Rugby union career
- Position: Halfback
Amateur team(s)
Years	Team	Apps	(Points)
- College Old Boys
Provincial / State sides
Years	Team	Apps	(Points)
2010–13	Manawatu	26	(5)

Karl Bryson (born 20 March 1989) is a New Zealand rugby union player who last played for Manawatu in the National Provincial Championship. His position of choice is halfback.

Known by the nickname "Killer", Bryson plays his club rugby for College Old Boys in Palmerston North.

He made his provincial debut in 2010 and continued playing in the main squad until 2013. He has not played since, however Manawatu coach Jeremy Cotter has named Bryson in the Wider Training Squad for 2016.

== Family ==
Bryson's father, Jim, played either as a fullback or wing. He also represented Manawatu, where as a goalkicker he scored 128 points.
