= Ryan Carrassi =

Italian actor and producer (born 1971)

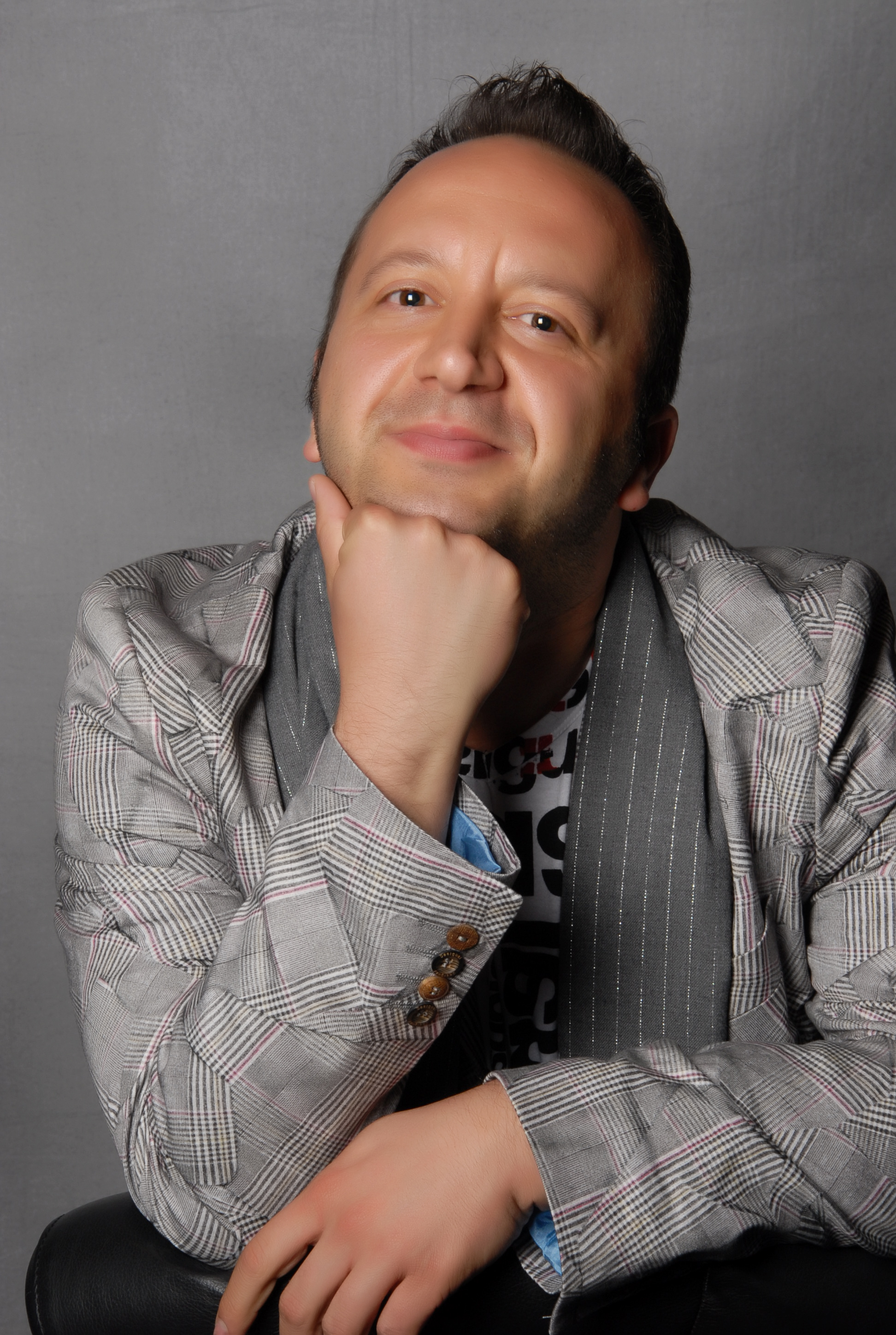
- Carrassi in 2012
- Born: Nicola Carrassi; August 1, 1971 (age 54); La Spezia, Italy
- Occupations: Actor, producer
- Years active: 1987–present

Ryan Carrassi (born August 1, 1971) is an Italian voice actor, score composer, film producer, screenwriter, song-writer, and journalist. His credits as a screenwriter include Sunset Beach.

== Career ==
Ryan Carrassi, (real name Nicola Carrassi, alternate name Nicola Bartolini Carrassi), was born in Italy. His family moved to London in 1974. In 1987, at 14, he began his career as a voice actor, speaking in English language for TV commercials and in Italian for many dubs of cartoons airing mainly on Mediaset-owned networks. In 1999, he moved to Hollywood, California, and changed his name to the more American-sounding Ryan Carrassi. He wrote storylines for the Aaron Spelling TV series Sunset Beach, and for award-winning daytime shows like Days of Our Lives and Passions. In Hollywood, he worked as producer and consultant for television broadcasters and US content producers.
