= Harold Miller (librarian) =

New Zealand lecturer, librarian, and writer

Harold Gladstone Miller (15 May 1898–4 March 1989) was a notable New Zealand lecturer, librarian and writer. He was born in Masterton, New Zealand, on 15 May 1898.

In 1953, Miller was awarded the Queen Elizabeth II Coronation Medal.
