= Cordelia Bugeja =

British actress (born 1976)

- Born: 5 March 1976 (age 49); Chichester, West Sussex, UK
- Occupation: Actor
- Agent: MacFarlane Chard Associates

Cordelia Bugeja (born 5 March 1976) is a British actress, best known for her roles as Julie in Not Going Out, Nikki in EastEnders, Melanie Hart in Family Affairs, and sex worker Kate in Respectable.

== Career ==
From 1993 to 1994 she appeared in the ITV sitcom Conjugal Rites as Gillian Masefield. In 2006, she appeared briefly in an episode of the sitcom Not Going Out as waitress Julie. (The producers had said in an interview that they had promised Bugeja a role after she stood in for someone at a read-through, but were forced to give her only a small part as Respectable was taking up most of her time.)

She appeared in over two dozen British TV commercials, most notably the award-winning campaign for Sure antiperspirant with the punchline "Thank god you dumped him first!", and a hugely successful campaign for Yakult yoghurt drink.

She had guest roles in The Bill once in 2005, where she appeared as the girlfriend of a man who was holding his dad and three officers hostage at St Hugh's and the second time in 2007 when she appeared in three episodes as Nina Lloyd, the ex-wife of CPS solicitor Matt Hinkley, who had driven her to a mental breakdown.

She has also appeared in Agatha Christie's Poirot as Lilly Luxmore, in Cards on the Table in 2006; the 2008 British movie The Crew as Debs and in the Doctors episode Someone Else's Shoes as Branwen Owen in 2013.

== Filmography ==
=== Film ===
Year	Title	Role	Notes
2000	The Calling	Young Nurse	
2001	Swimming Pool	Mel	
2008	MindFlesh	Lyn	
2008	The Crew	Debs	
2015	Pleasure Island	Sara	
2017	King Arthur: Legend of the Sword	Woman 3	
2018	Above the Clouds	Susan	
2020	The Trip to Greece	Katherine	

=== Television ===
Year	Title	Role	Notes
1993	Eye of the Storm	Nell Frewen	6 episodes
1993–1994	Conjugal Rites	Gillian Masefield	13 episodes
1995	The Ruth Rendell Mysteries	Young Rosario	Episode: "The Strawberry Tree: Part 1"
1997–1999	Family Affairs	Melanie Hart	
2000	Casualty	Jane	Episode: "The Morning After"
2003	EastEnders	Nikki	Episode dated 9 June 2003
2003–2016	Doctors	Various roles	6 episodes
2004	When I'm Sixty-Four	Pool Attendant	Television film
2004	Silent Witness	Doctor Bennett	Episode: "Body 21: Part 1"
2004	Gaby & the Girls	Gaby Bellamy	Television film
2005	Agatha Christie's Poirot	Mrs. Luxmore	Episode: "Cards on the Table"
2005–2007	The Bill	Nina Lloyd / Gillian Ellis	4 episodes
2006	Hustle	Receptionist	Episode: "Whittaker Our Way Out"
2006	Vital Signs	Miss McCabe	Episode #1.2
2006	Respectable	Kate	6 episodes
2006	Not Going Out	Julie	Episode: "Aussie"
2006, 2007	The IT Crowd	Abi	2 episodes
2007	Christmas at the Riviera	Samantha	Television film
2011–2012	Mount Pleasant	Jane	4 episodes
2012	Comedy Showcase	Alice	Episode: "House of Rooms"
2013	Luckless	George's Mum	Television film
2013	Holby City	Esther Leach	Episode: "Father's Day"
2020	The Trip	Katherine	3 episodes
2024	Freedom at Midnight	Edwina Mountbatten	

== See also ==
- Bugeja (surname)
