= Bradley Rodden =

New Zealand cricketer

Brad Rodden
Personal information
- Full name: Bradley Paul Rodden
- Born: 29 January 1989 (age 37); Christchurch, New Zealand
- Batting: Right-handed
- Bowling: Right-arm medium

Domestic team information
- Years: Team
- 2013/14–2014/15: Otago
- 2020/21: Auckland
- Source: CricInfo, 22 May 2016

Bradley Paul Rodden (born 29 January 1989) is a New Zealand cricketer. He has played first-class cricket and limited overs cricket for Otago and Auckland.

Brad Rodden was born at Christchurch in 1989. He played age-group cricket for Otago from the 2003–04 season in the under-17 and then under-19 and under-23 sides before making his representative debut for the side in 2013–14. He played for the Otago side for two seasons, making seven first-class, three List A and four Twenty20 appearances, scoring a century in his second match for the side. From the 2017–18 season Rodden played for the Auckland A side and in 2020–21 made four List A and three Twenty20 appearances for the full Auckland side. He played club cricket in Scotland in 2009 and in February 2007 played in three Youth One Day Internationals for the New Zealand under-19 national side against India under-19s.

Rodden has also played association football for Dunedin Technical as a forward.
