= George Jobberns =

New Zealand geoegrapher

George Jobberns CBE FRGS MNZGS (2 June 1895 – 30 August 1974) was a New Zealand geographer and educator.

Born in 1895 at Te Moana near Geraldine in the foothills of South Canterbury, New Zealand, Jobberns taught the first Geography I course at Canterbury University College in 1934. In 1937 he was appointed lecturer-in-charge of the first independent Department of Geography in New Zealand and in 1942 was elected to the first chair of Geography in New Zealand. On his retirement in May 1960, he was made Professor emeritus of the University of Canterbury. In the 1963 New Year Honours, Jobberns was appointed a Commander of the Order of the British Empire.

Jobberns died in Christchurch on 30 August 1974, at 79 years.

The Jobberns room at the University of Canterbury's Department of Geography was opened on 9 April 1976 by Vice Chancellor Professor N. C. Phillips to commemorate George Jobberns and his significant contributions to the subject of geography in New Zealand.
