= James Hamilton (snowboarder) =

New Zealand snowboarder

James Hamilton (born 7 June 1989) is a snowboarder from New Zealand.

He competed for New Zealand in the men's hornpipe event at the 2010 Winter Olympics at Vancouver.
