= Erua (film) =

- Directed by: David Copeland
- Written by: Rawiri Paratene
- Produced by: Ruth Franks
- Starring: Grant Tilly; Turei Reedy
- Cinematography: Max Quinn
- Edited by: Allan Honey; Sue Malcolmson
- Release date: September 18, 1988
- Running time: 50 min
- Country: New Zealand
- Language: English

Erua is a 1988 New Zealand television film. It is a dramatisation of the years Toss Woollaston painted Erua Brown. It aired on One on 18 September.

== Cast ==
- Grant Tilly as Toss Woollaston
- Turei Reedy as Erua Brown
- Dinah Priestley as Edith Woollaston
- Bub Bridger as Mrs Brown

== Awards ==
Listener Film and Television Awards 1989

- Best Drama: Erua, producer Ruth Franks - won
- Best Screenplay: Rawiri Paratene - won
- Best Actor: Grant Tilly - won
- Best Contribution to a soundtrack: Alan Rattee and John Boswell - nominated
- Best Editing: Allan Honey and Sue Malcolmson - nominated
