= Double J and Twice the T =

New Zealand hip hop duo

- Origin: Auckland, New Zealand
- Genres: Hip hop, pop
- Years active: 1988–1991
- Label: Definitiv/EMI NZ
- Past members: Jerry Tala Brown; Jeremy Toomata

Double J and Twice the T was a New Zealand hip hop duo, best known for their 1989 #2 charting song "She's A Mod/Mod Rap", a hip hop reworking of Ray Columbus & the Invaders' 1964 cover of "She's a Mod". They are also known for their 1990 eco anthem "Def to be Green" in which they teamed up with Auckland Regional Council's water conservation mascot Robert D Frogg.

== History ==
The group consisted of Samoan-New Zealand school friends rapper Jerry Tala Brown and beatboxer Jeremy Toomata who originally met at Otahuhu College. The pair started performing in 1988 as JJ and the Jammers, and the Double Jays. They won two battle of the bands competitions, which brought them to the attention of Mike Chunn who signed them to his Definitive Records label, an imprint of EMI Music New Zealand.

It was Chunn who suggested the duo perform a rap cover of "She's A Mod", inspired by the Fat Boys hit reworking of "Wipe Out" with The Beach Boys. Their four charting singles were co-written with Stanley Manthyng of World Gone Wild, another Definitiv Records act. At the 1989 New Zealand Music Awards, the duo were nominated for three awards including Most Promising Group. Their debut album All Wrapped Up was released in 1989, but did not chart. The group enjoyed three top-ten singles and released two more singles before breaking up in 1991.

In 1994 Jeremy Toomata teamed up with Herman Loto to form the hip hop duo Radio Backstab & DJ Payback. Their song "Bassed on a Lost Cause" appeared on the iconic New Zealand compilation album Proud: An Urban-Pacific Streetsoul Compilation.

== Discography ==
=== Albums ===
| Year | Title | Details | Peak chart positions |
| Year | Title | Details | NZ |
|---|---|---|---|
| 1989 | All Wrapped Up | Label: Definitive; Formats: CD, cassette | — |
"—" denotes a recording that did not chart or was not released in that territory.

=== Singles ===
| Year | Title | Peak chart positions | Album |
| Year | Title | NZ | Album |
|---|---|---|---|
| 1989 | "She's A Mod / Mod Rap" (as Double J and Twice the T with Ray Columbus) | 2 | All Wrapped Up |
| 1989 | "Seven Days" | 7 | All Wrapped Up |
| 1990 | "Def to be Green" (as Double J and Twice the T with Robert D Frogg) | 4 | All Wrapped Up |
| 1990 | "U Can Do It 2" | 37 | All Wrapped Up |
| 1990 | "Have You Heard" (as Double J and Twice the T with DJ Freddy V ) | — | All Wrapped Up |
"—" denotes a recording that did not chart or was not released in that territory.

== Awards ==
| Year | Nominee / work | Award | Result |
|---|---|---|---|
| 1989 | Double J & Twice the T "She's A Mod / Mod Rap" | Single of the Year (New Zealand Music Awards) | Nominated |
| 1989 | Double J & Twice the T | Most Promising Group (New Zealand Music Awards) | Nominated |
| 1989 | Tony Johns "She's A Mod/ Mod Rap" | Best Video (New Zealand Music Awards) | Nominated |
| 1989 | Mike Chunn All Wrapped Up | Best Producer (New Zealand Music Awards) | Nominated |
