= Roger Hall (playwright) =

New Zealand playwright (born 1939)

Sir Roger Hall KNZM QSO
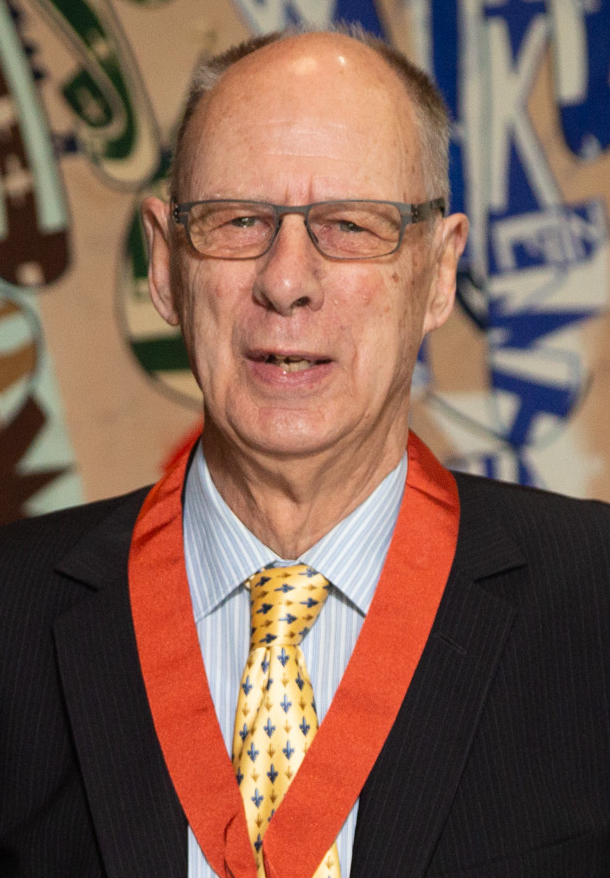
- Hall in 2019
- Born: Roger Leighton Hall; 17 January 1939 (age 87); Woodford, Essex, England
- Education: University College School
- Occupations: Playwright, actor
- Writing career
- Genre: Comedy/drama

Sir Roger Leighton Hall KNZM QSO (born 17 January 1939) is one of New Zealand's most successful playwrights, arguably best known for comedies that carry a vein of social criticism and feelings of pathos.

== Biography ==
=== Early years ===
Hall was born in Woodford, Essex, England, and educated at London's University College School from 1952 until 1955, when he embarked on a career in insurance. He emigrated to New Zealand in 1957 and continued to work in insurance, also performing in amateur theatre in the city of Wellington. He continued to act while attending Wellington Teachers’ College and Victoria University of Wellington; fellow actor John Clarke praised his impression of then Prime Minister Keith Holyoake as the template for all others. Hall began writing plays for children while teaching, which included a spell at Berhampore School, Wellington. He became a naturalised New Zealander in 1980.

=== Career ===
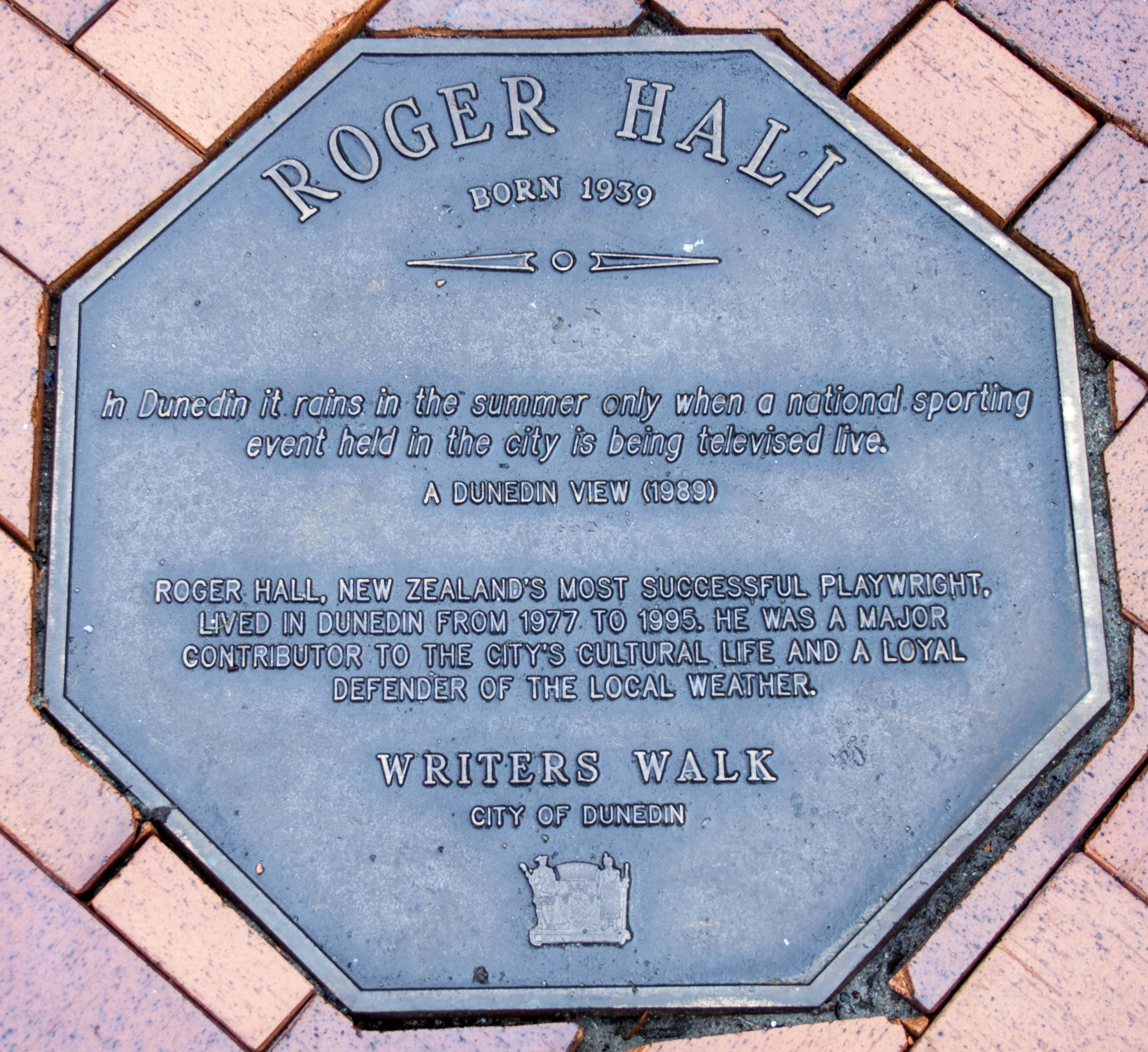
Commemorative plaque dedicated to Roger Hall in Dunedin, on the Writers' Walk on the Octagon

Hall began writing for television in the 1960s – over the next four decades his television output would grow to include one-off plays, documentaries, pioneering New Zealand television series Buck House and Pukemanu and time on political satire Spin Doctors. Alongside his writing, he appeared on-screen with actor Grant Tilly on 60s sketch show In View of the Circumstances.

Hall's best-known work in New Zealand is probably his breakthrough play Glide Time (1976), which depicts the frustrations and petty triumphs of a group of so-called 'public servants' working in a government office. It gave rise to a radio show, a one-off television adaptation, then popular 1980s television series Gliding On. A sequel play and television series, both called Market Forces also followed, set in the "restructured" public service environment of New Zealand's post-Rogernomics era.

The characters of The Share Club (1987, before the Stock Market crash) and After the Crash (1988) were seen on television series Neighbourhood Watch.

Hall's best-known works internationally are Middle-Age Spread (1978, revised 1980) and Conjugal Rites (1991). Middle Age Spread revolves around a headmaster who has an affair with a young teacher. The tragi-comedy had a 15-month run in the West End and won the Comedy of the Year Award (Society of London Theatre) and in 1979 became one of the first New Zealand plays to be transformed into a feature film. Grant Tilly starred, as he had when the play debuted in Wellington. Conjugal Rites was made into a situation comedy series in the UK starring Gwen Taylor and Michael Williams . The characters from Conjugal Rites reappear in Hall's final play to date, Winding Up, which premiered at the Auckland Theatre Company in 2020.

He was co-writer with Philip Norman and A K Grant of Footrot Flats the Musical, which has had more than 120 productions in New Zealand and Australia. Their follow-up collaboration, Love Off the Shelf, premiered at the Fortune Theatre, Dunedin, in 1986. It had two pre-West End try-out productions in the United Kingdom, the second in 1993 directed by Sir Alan Ayckbourn at his Scarborough Theatre, and the libretto was published by Samuel French Limited.

In recent years, his plays Who Wants to be 100? (Anyone Who's 99) (2008), Four Flat Whites in Italy (2009), and A Shortcut to Happiness (2011) had hugely successful runs throughout New Zealand. His show about grandparenting, You Can Always Hand Them Back (2012), has songs by British performer/songwriter Peter Skellern, and has been performed throughout New Zealand and had a season in the UK.

Hall has had many plays, series, and talks on radio, including The Dream Factory for the BBC.

Hall has contributed to the arts in several other ways. Most notably he organised the first NZ Writers' Week, held in Dunedin in 1989, where twenty-nine NZ writers appeared, NZ plays were performed, and various exhibitions linked to local writing were held. Thousands of people attended, and another Writers’ Week was held two years later, and the event continues in Dunedin in a modified form every two years.

In 2005, he arranged for a scene set on Takapuna Beach on Christmas Day in the 1930s from Bruce Mason's one-man play The End of the Golden Weather to be performed on Takapuna Beach on Christmas Day. Actor Stephen Lovatt does the one-man show that is presented every year. It has now become an established tradition, with up to 500 people attending the free event. OXFAM benefits from a collection and Lovatt donates his fee to the same charity.

In the 1980s, Hall set up a society to improve children's television (Monitor) and has also served on many arts boards and organisations including the NZ Literary Fund Advisory Committee, the Dunedin Public Art Gallery, chairman of Fortune Theatre Board, Frank Sargeson Trust, Janet Frame Eden Street Trust, and Governor of the Arts Foundation of New Zealand.

Hall's autobiography, Bums on seats, was published by Penguin Books in 1998. He has also written for children and family audiences (with a series of pantomimes, staged annually at Circa Theatre from 2005 to 2012 and 2014–2015). in the 21st century has also been a frequent book reviewer and travel journalist in publications such as the New Zealand Listener, New Zealand Herald and Dominion-Post.

He has a son and a daughter. His daughter, Pip Hall, is a playwright and television producer.

== Honours and awards ==
Hall was a Burns Fellow in 1977 and in 1978. In the 1987 New Year Honours, he was made a Companion of the Queen's Service Order for community service. Victoria University made him an Honorary Doctor of Literature in 1996. He was appointed a Companion of the New Zealand Order of Merit in the 2003 Queen's Birthday Honours, for services as a playwright. In 2006 he was the subject of documentary Who Laughs Last.

In 2014 he was presented a Scroll of Honour from the Variety Artists Club of New Zealand Inc for a lifetime of excellence in the performing arts.

In 2015 he was awarded the Prime Minister's Awards for Literary Achievement in Fiction.

In the 2019 Queen's Birthday Honours, Hall was promoted to Knight Companion of the New Zealand Order of Merit, for services to theatre.

== See also ==
- Category:Plays by Roger Hall (playwright)
- Television in New Zealand
