= Grant Tilly =

New Zealand stage, movie and TV actor, set designer, teacher & artist

Grant Tilly MBE
- Born: Grant Leonard Ridgway Tilly; 12 December 1937; Sydney, New South Wales, Australia
- Died: 11 April 2012 (aged 74); Wellington, New Zealand
- Years active: 1969–2011

Grant Leonard Ridgway Tilly MBE (12 December 1937 – 11 April 2012) was a New Zealand stage, movie and television actor, set designer, teacher and artist.

== Life and career ==
Tilly was educated in Wellington, taking art at Wellington Technical College in the early 1950s. He then attended teachers' colleges in Wellington and Dunedin, specialising in arts and crafts teaching. He was awarded an overseas bursary and studied children's drama in England during the early 1960s, learning from the best, Peter Slade and Brian Way. On his return to New Zealand he tutored drama with Nola Millar and later became a senior acting tutor at New Zealand Drama School.

In 1976, Tilly co-founded Wellington's Circa Theatre, where he acted in a number of plays written by playwright Roger Hall, one of New Zealand's most successful playwrights. He designed the set for Hall's breakthrough hit, the public service satire Glide Time. Tilly is known for his acting role in the follow-up Middle Age Spread and solo rugby play C'mon Black, that playwright Roger Hall wrote with Tilly in mind.

Tilly designed the theatre space of Circa Theatre for the original location in a building in Harris St, and worked with the architects designing the theatre space the new and much larger building that opened in 1994.

Aside from a busy stage career, Tilly acted often for the screen. He made his television debut in the 1967 one-off comedy The Tired Man then ad-libbed alongside playwright Joseph Musaphia on the children's show Joe's World. Tilly's biggest screen roles include that of a headmaster who has an affair in 1979's film adaptation of Middle Age Spread (showbusiness magazine Variety compared him to "an antipodean Woody Allen") and in the 1982 comedy Carry Me Back, as the farmer who must sneak his father's body back home after he unexpectedly dies. Both movies were directed by Tilly's Circa Theatre colleague, John Reid. Grant Tilly's is the voice in the Oscar-nominated animated Western short The Frog, the Dog and the Devil.

His television credits include an award-winning performance as artist Toss Woollaston in the teleplay Erua, Reverend Henry Williams in the historical epic The Governor, the Margaret Mahy fantasy Cuckoo Land (1995), and a starring role in 2009 short Roof Rattling. Tilly also had many smaller parts in feature films, including two adventures shot partly or wholly in New Zealand: he was "The Collector" in the chase movie Race for the Yankee Zephyr, and a villainous Imperial German, "Count Heinrich von Rittenberg", in Savage Islands (also known as Nate and Hayes).

In addition to acting, Tilly worked as an illustrator and writer for the Wellington newspaper Evening Post in the 1970's and 1980's. Amongst his artistic outputs were artworks encompassing prints, drawings, three-dimensional artworks made with wood and furniture. His "Drawing on History" articles focused on the changing face of Wellington's urban landscape.

In the 1988 New Year Honours, Tilly was appointed a Member of the Order of the British Empire, for services to the theatre.

In 2002, Tilly donated his skill to design a flexible 90-seat performance space for Stagecraft Theatre (a non-professional theatre company in Wellington). The Ngā Whakarākei O Whātaitai / Wellington Theatre Awards annually an award called The Grant Tilly Actor of the Year.

== Death ==
In April 2012, Tilly died from prostate and kidney cancer after being bedridden since January. He was 74 years old and cremated in Wellington.

== Children ==
He has three adult sons - Bryn, Torben, Miles - from his marriage, and an adult daughter - Sasha - from a later de facto relationship.

== Filmography and television appearances ==
- Gone Up North for a While (1972, TV Movie) – Doctor
- An Awful Silence (1972, TV movie) - Mr. Beech
- Telephone Etiquette (1974) – Jenkins
- Skin Deep (1978) – Phil Barrett
- The Les Deverett Variety Hour (1978, TV Series) – Various Characters
- Rachel (1978, TV series) - Jim
- Middle Age Spread (1979) – Colin
- High Country (1980) – Clive Blackburn
- Beyond Reasonable Doubt (1980) – David Morris
- Race for the Yankee Zephyr (1981) – Collector
- Carry Me Back (1982) – Arthur Donovan
- Savage Islands (1983) – Count Von Rittenberg
- Other Halves (1984) – Dr. Wray
- Dangerous Orphans (1985) – Beck
- Cuckoo Land (1986, TV Series) – Branchy
- Erua (1988, TV film) - Toss Woollaston
- Warm Nights on a Slow Moving Train (1988) – Politician
- The Ray Bradbury Theatre (1989) – Stockwell
- The Returning (1990) – Dr. Pitts
- Shark in the Park (1990, TV Series) – Inspector Englebretsen
- Alex (1992) – Mr. Upjohn
- Mirror, Mirror (1995, TV Series) – Sir Gerald Salisbury
- Flight of the Albatross (1995) – Narrator (voice)
- Brilliant Lies (1996) – Steve Lovett
- Every Woman's Dream (1996, TV Movie) – Phil Dobrowski
- Hercules: The Legendary Journeys (1997, TV Series) – Toth
- The Chosen (1998, TV Movie) – Father McCrory
- The Legend of William Tell (1998, TV Series) – Mondar
- Dark Knight (2000, TV Series) – Fadain
- Turangawaewae (2002, Short) – Mr. Finch
- The Strip (2002–2003, TV Series) – Ken Walker
- 30 Days of Night (2007) – Gus Lambert
- Roof Rattling (2010, Short) – Old Man
