= Michael Williams (actor) =

British actor (1935–2001)

Michael Williams KSG
- Born: Michael Leonard Williams; 9 July 1935; Salforth, England
- Died: 11 January 2001 (aged 65); Hampstead, London, England
- Occupation: Actor
- Years active: 1961–1999
- Spouse: Judi Dench (m. 1971)
- Children: Finty Williams

Michael Leonard Williams (9 July 1935 – 11 January 2001) was a British actor who played both classical and comedy roles. He was best known for voicing Dr. Watson in the long-running Sherlock Holmes adaptations for BBC Radio, opposite Clive Merrison as Holmes, and for starring alongside his wife Judi Dench in the ITV sitcom A Fine Romance.

== Biography ==
Williams was born on 9 July 1935 in Liverpool, Merseyside.

Williams married Judi Dench on 5 February 1971, the same year in which they co-starred in a stage production of John Webster's The Duchess of Malfi, and, as RSC actors, in Pack of Lies and Mr. and Mrs. Nobody. They had one daughter, Finty Williams, who is also an actress. Williams was also godfather to the actor Rory Kinnear.

Williams was the President of the Roman Catholic Actors' Guild. He was a fan of Everton.

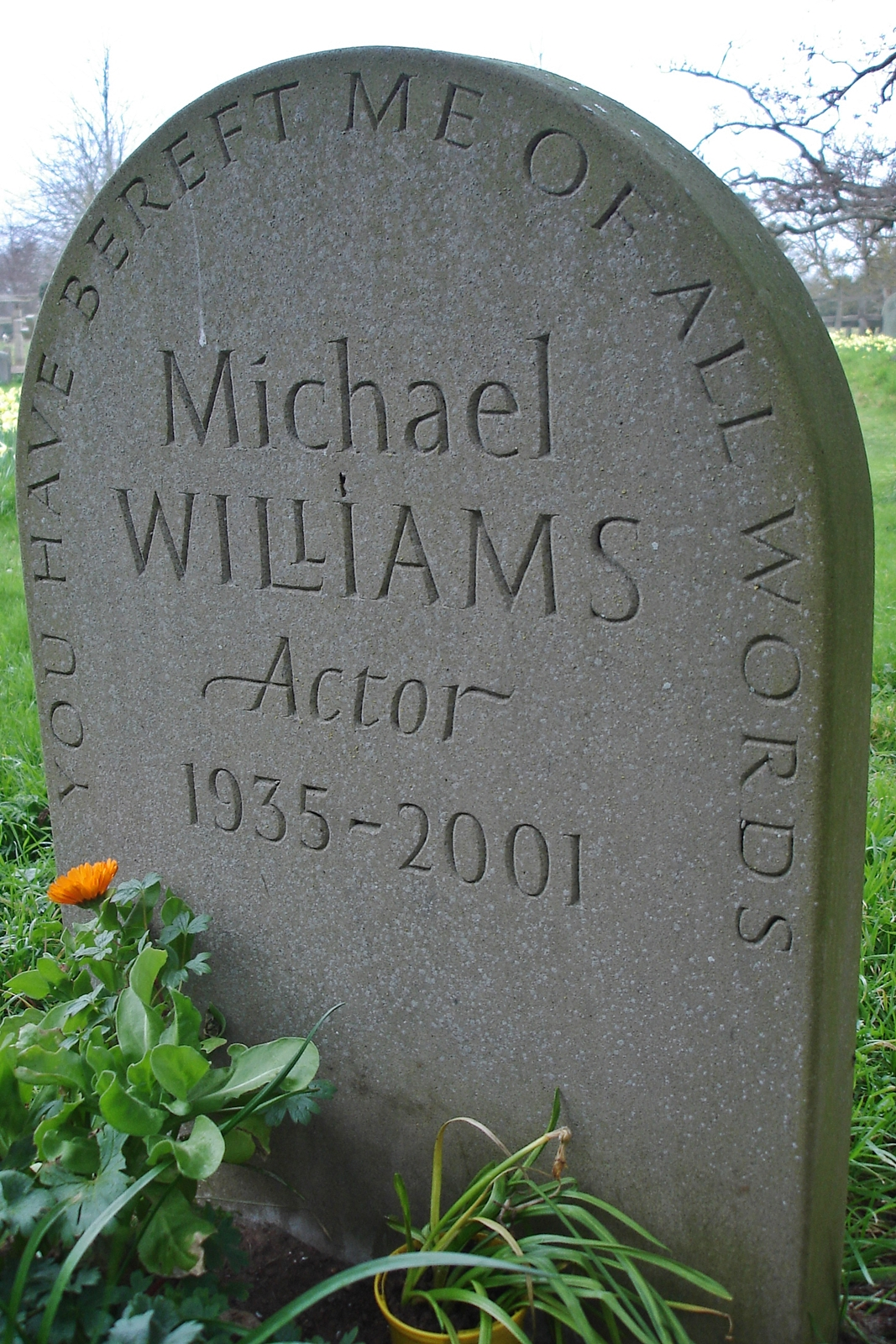
Williams' grave

Shortly before his death from lung cancer aged 65, Williams was appointed a Knight of St Gregory (KSG) by Pope John Paul II for his contribution to Catholic life in Britain. The honour was officially bestowed upon him at home on 10 January 2001. He died the next day, and was buried in the churchyard of St Leonard's, the Anglican parish church of Charlecote, Warwickshire.

== Filmography ==
=== Film ===
Year	Title	Role	Notes
1962	The Trial of Joan of Arc	Englishman	Uncredited
1967	Marat/Sade	Herald	
1968	Tell Me Lies	Guest	Documentary
1972	Eagle in a Cage	Barry O'Meara	
1974	Dead Cert	Sandy Mason	
1982	Enigma	Hirsch, Limmer's Assistant	
1983	Educating Rita	Brian	
1989	Henry V	Michael Williams	
1999	Tea with Mussolini	British Consul	

=== Television ===
Year	Title	Role	Notes
1962	Z-Cars	Norbert Nuttall	1 episode
1970	A Family at War	Eddie Chappell	1 episode
1971	Elizabeth R	François, Duke of Anjou and Alençon	1 episode
1975	The Hanged Man	Alan Crowe	8 episodes
1979	My Son, My Son	William Essex	8 episodes
1980	Love in a Cold Climate	Davey Warbeck	8 episodes
1981–1984	A Fine Romance	Mike Selway	26 episodes
1987	Blunt: The Fourth Man	Goronwy Rees	
1988	Double First	Norman 'N.V.' Standish	7 episodes
1988-1989	Charlie Chalk	Charlie Chalk, Lewis T. Duck, Trader Jones and Litterbug (voice)	13 episodes
1989	Screen Two - Angel Voices	Michael Darlow	1 episode
1999	Can you hear me thinking	Kevin	90 minute BBC TV film
1993–1994	Conjugal Rites	Barry Masefield	13 episodes
1993–1995	September Song	Billy Balsam	20 episodes
1996	Kavanagh QC	DCI Knowland	1 episode
1996-2000	Brambly Hedge	Mr. Apple	8 episodes
1997	A Dance to the Music of Time	Ted Jeavons	2 episodes
1999	The Magical Legend of the Leprechauns	Father Daley	2 episodes, (final appearance)

== Selected radio roles ==
Year	Title	Role
1973	The War Between Men and Women	reader
1989–1998	Sherlock Holmes	Dr. Watson
1990	The Forsyte Chronicles	Young Jolyon Forsyte
1995–1996	Change at Oglethorpe	Rocket
1995–1999	The George Cragge series	George Cragge
1997	Mansfield Park	Sir Thomas Bertram
1998–1999	Old Dog and Partridge	Jack
1999–2000	Bristow	Bristow

== Stage roles ==
Principal stage appearances; mostly with the Royal Shakespeare Company:

- A Midsummer Night's Dream (1963)
- The Beggar's Opera (1963)
- The Representative (1963)
- King Lear (1964)
- The Comedy of Errors (1964)
- Marat/Sade (1964)
- The Jew of Malta (1964)
- Don't Make Me Laugh (1965)
- Timon of Athens (1965) - Painter
- Hamlet (1965)
- Tango (1966)
- The Taming of the Shrew (1967) - Petruchio
- As You Like It (1967)
- Troilus and Cressida (1968) - Troilus
- London Assurance (1970)
- The Merchant of Venice (1971)
- The Duchess of Malfi (1971)
- Henry V (1971) - Henry V
- Toad of Toad Hall (1972)
- Content to Whisper (1973)
- Jingo (1975)
- Too True to Be Good (1975)
- The Comedy of Errors (1976) - Dromio of Syracuse
- The Winter's Tale (1976)
- Schweik in the Second World War (1977)
- The Montrous Regiment (1978)
- A Village Wooing (1981)
- Quartermaine's Terms (1982)
- Pack of Lies (1983/4)
- Two into One (1984)
- Mr and Mrs Nobody (1986/7)
- Out of Order (1990)
- The Tempest (1995)
- The Round Dozen (1996)
- Brief Lives (1997/8)
- The Forest (1999)

Also appeared in the Royal Shakespeare Company's Theatre-Go-Round Festival, Round House Theatre, London, 1970.
