= Marjorie Chambers =

New Zealand nurse (1906–1989)

Eileen Marjorie Fosbery Chambers OBE (29 May 1906 – 6 April 1989) was a New Zealand nurse, hospital matron, nursing tutor and administrator. She was born in Sydney, New South Wales, Australia on 29 May 1906.

== Early life ==
Chambers was born in Sydney on 29 May 1906 to Fosbery Maunsell Nancarrow, a shipping clerk, and Violet Marjorie Campbell. The family moved to Christchurch around 1910 and Chambers attended the private girls' school St Margaret's College. Her father would not allow her to go to university so instead she became a governess. In 1927, Chambers married a sheepfarmer, Bernard Chambers; however the marriage didn't last and the couple was divorced in 1938.

== Career ==
In need of a career, Chambers applied to Christchurch Hospital for training and became a registered nurse in 1940. She completed Plunket Society training to become a nurse for mothers and new babies the following year, postgraduate training in Wellington in 1944 and maternity nurse training at Hutt Hospital in 1948. As a result, she was appointed a tutor sister in Christchurch and in 1949 became matron at Oamaru Hospital. While in the position, she planned and developed new buildings such as laboratories, kitchens, maternity wing and nurses' home.

In 1952 she was promoted again, to matron of Christchurch Hospital, and held this role until 1963 when she was appointed matron-in-chief of all the hospital board's institutions. As matron at Christchurch Hospital, she implemented a number of changes to services, including curtain screens between beds, changes to visiting hours and ward routines, and a nursing technique committee to standardise practices. Chambers was an advocate for nursing education, and opened nurse training schools and also offered study programmes for staff. She also sought to attract older and married women to the profession, and supported a shorter community nursing programme introduced in 1966. During her time at Christchurch she also oversaw the opening of Princess Margaret Hospital, additions to nurses' homes and a building programme for the main Christchurch Hospital.

In the 1963 New Year Honours, Chambers was appointed an Officer of the Order of the British Empire.

In 1988, Chambers published her autobiography, My Life in Nursing. She died in Christchurch the following year, aged 83.
