= Wellington tramway system =

Tramway system in New Zealand

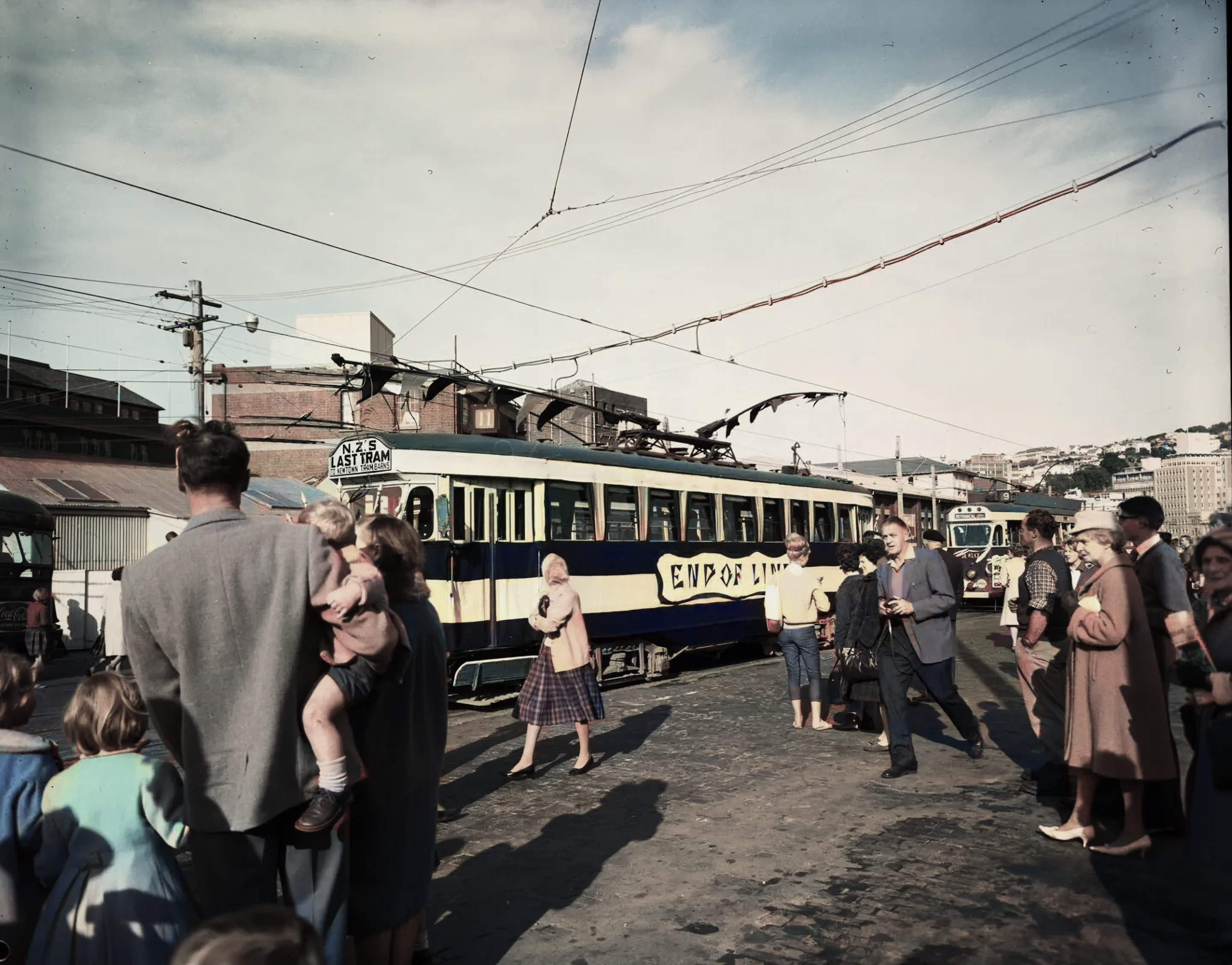
- The last regular tram service in New Zealand, c. 2 May 1964

Operation
- Locale: Wellington, New Zealand
- Open: 24 August 1878
- Close: 2 May 1964
- Status: Closed
- Routes: 11
- Owner: Wellington City Council (from 1 August 1900)

Infrastructure
- Track gauge: 3 ft 6 in (1,067 mm); 4 ft (1,219 mm)
- Propulsion systems: Steam (1878-1882); Horse-drawn (1882-1904); Electric (from 1904)

Statistics
Steam engine era: 1878–1882
- Status: Converted to Horse-drawn
- Owner: Wellington City Tramways Company Ltd
- Track gauge: 3 ft 6 in (1,067 mm)
- Propulsion system: Steam
- Route length: 4.5 Km (1878)
Horse-drawn era: 1882–1904
- Status: Replaced by electric trams
- Owners: Wellington City Tramways Company Ltd (1882–1900); Wellington City Council (1900–1904)
- Track gauge: 3 ft 6 in (1,067 mm)
- Propulsion system: Horse-drawn
- Route length: 16 km (1904)
Electric tram era: 1904–1964
- Status: Closed and replaced by buses and trolleybuses
- Owner: Wellington City Council
- Operators: Tramways Department (1904-1948); Transport Department (1948-1964)
- Track gauge: 4 ft (1,219 mm)
- Propulsion system: Electric
- Electrification: Overhead line, 550 V DC
- Route length: 53 km (1943)
Overview
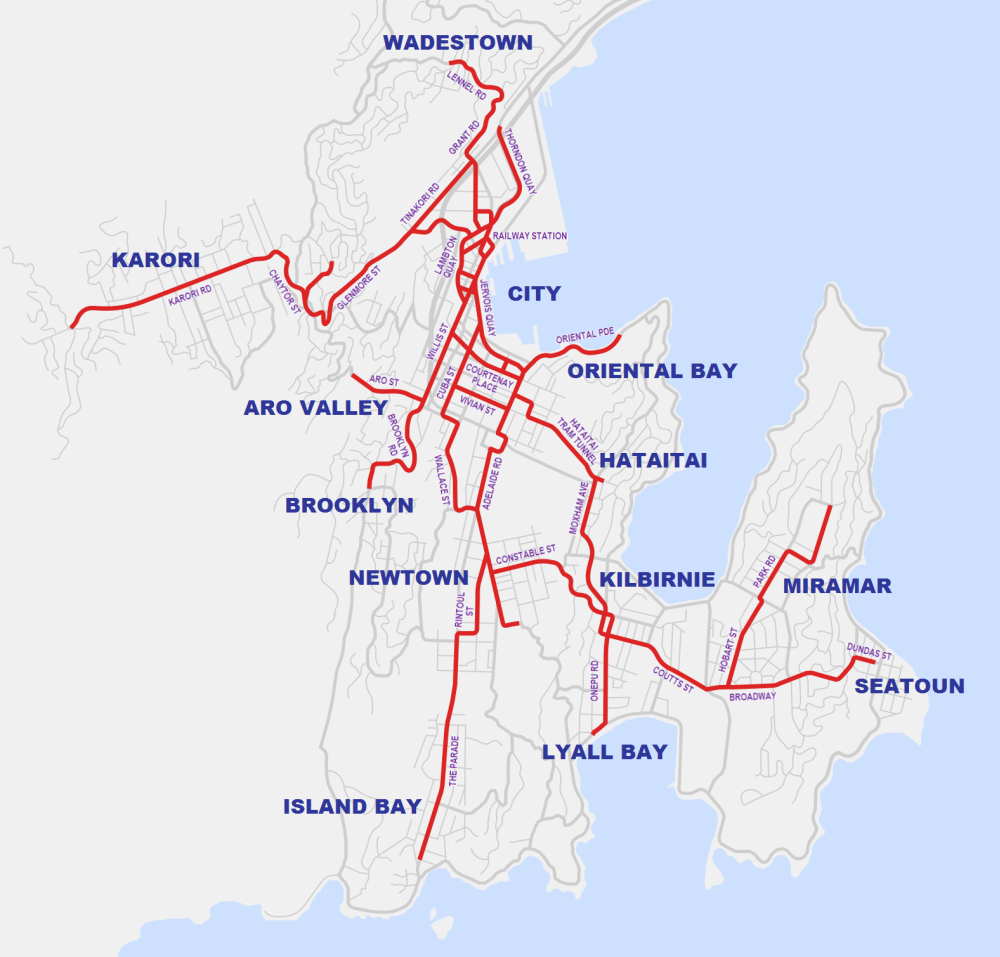
Wellington tramway network at its greatest extent, superimposed on the city as it is today

Wellington had a tramway system that operated from 1878 to 2 May 1964, when the last line was replaced by buses. The tramways were initially owned by a private company but were purchased by the city and formed a significant part of the city's transport system. Historically, it was an extensive network, with steam and horse trams from 1878, and then electric trams ran from 1904 to 1964.

In 1878, Wellington's trams were steam-powered, with an engine drawing a separate carriage. The engines were widely deemed unsatisfactory, however — they created a great deal of soot, were heavy (increasing track maintenance costs), and often frightened horses. By 1882, a combination of public pressure and financial concerns caused the engines to be replaced by horses. In 1902, after the tramways came into public ownership, it was decided to electrify the system, and the first electric tram ran in 1904. Trams operated singly and were mostly single-deck with some (open-top) double-deck.

Wellington's more northern suburbs, such as Johnsonville and Tawa, were not served by the tram network, as they were (and are) served by the Wellington railway system. The Wellington Cable Car, another part of Wellington's transport network, is sometimes described as a tram but is not generally considered so, being a funicular railway. It was opened in 1902 and is still in operation. Wellington's electric tramways had an unusual gauge of 4 ft (1,219 mm), a narrow gauge. The steam and horse trams were 3 ft 6 in (1,067 mm) gauge, which was also narrow and the same as New Zealand's national railway gauge.

== Background ==
In 1872, the Tramways Act was enacted, allowing local authorities and private companies to construct and operate tramways in the streets. The following year, Charles O'Neill presented a proposal to lay down tracks and run a tramway, which he submitted to the Wellington City Council.

On 23 March 1876, the City Council awarded a deed to O'Neill. This deed granted him permission to construct a tramway, with O'Neill and his team agreeing to commence work within six months and to complete it within 18 months. The agreement was set for a duration of ten years, during which the City Council had the right to extend the tramway line at any time. Additionally, the City Council retained the option to purchase the tramway after ten years or to remove the tracks.

On 29 June 1876, William Fitzherbert signed the order authorising the construction of the tramways, which confirmed the terms of the City Council's deed. On 9 January 1877, locomotives, carriages, and rails had been ordered from England. The steam trams were manufactured by Merryweather & Sons in London, and 14 tram trailers originated from New York and were manufactured by John Stephenson Company. The larger trailers could accommodate 22 passengers, while the smaller ones held 14.

On 14 November of the same year, the Wellington City Tramways Company Ltd was formed. Labourers who were hired to lay the tracks were paid 10 shillings daily, while carpenters earned 14 shillings. The rails arrived on the sailing ship Broomhall in July 1877. The tramway was designed as a single-track, complete with sidings, passing loops, and crossings. The track was laid on sleepers made of Totara or Rimu, resting on a gravel bed.

== History ==
=== Early tramways: 1878-1900 ===
==== Steam tram ====
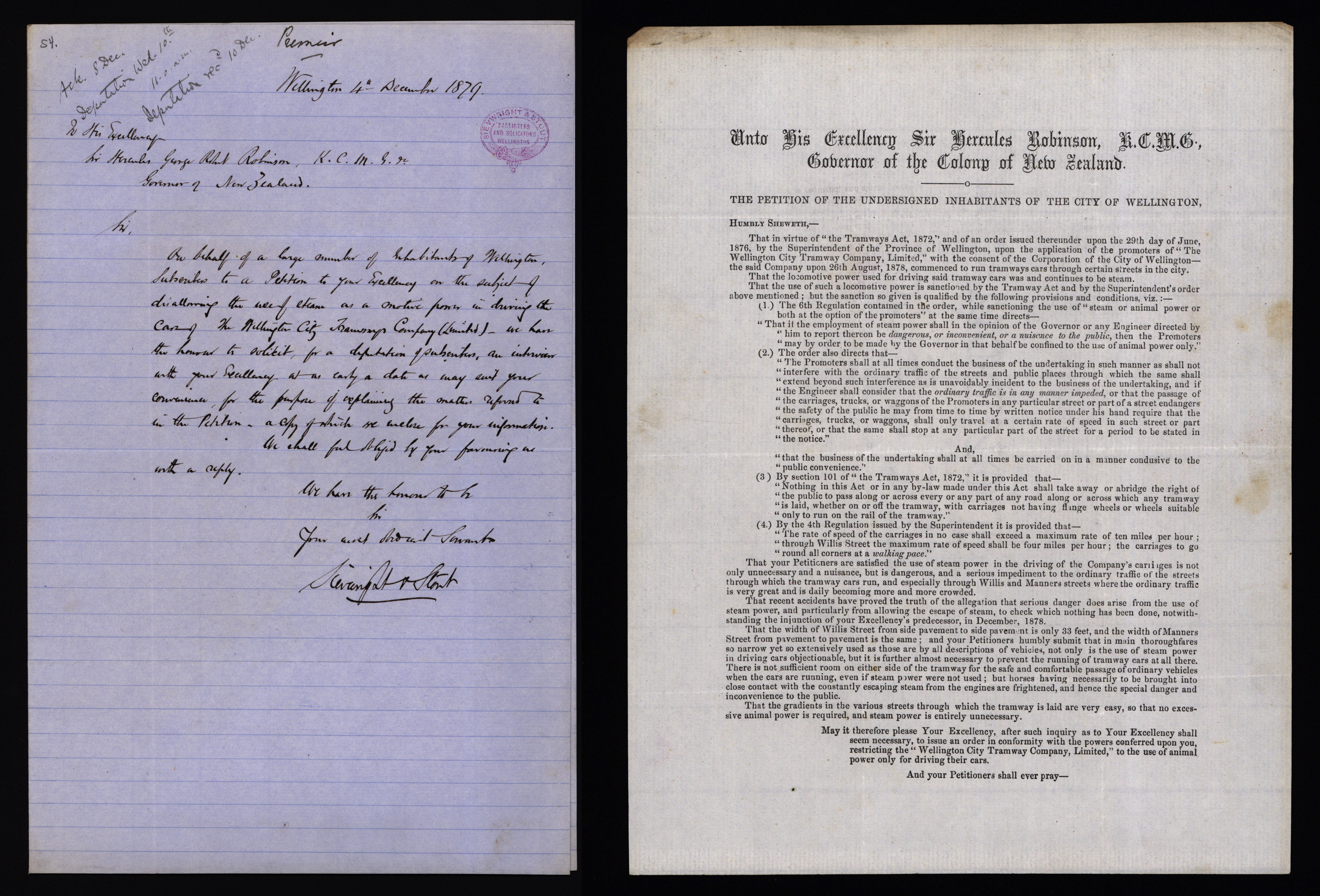
1879 petition to Governor Sir Hercules Robinson requesting "the use of animal power only" for Wellington's trams

The first tram line in Wellington opened on 24 August 1878 for £NZ40,000. The line was 4.47 km in length and used a gauge of 3 ft 6 in (1,067 mm). It ran from the north end of Lambton Quay to a point just south of the Basin Reserve. The first tram was ridden by the Governor, the Marquess of Normanby, and travelled at a speed of 10 km/h. The Tramways Company claimed in their opening day speech it was the first steam-tram in the southern hemisphere but Thames had any existence steam tramway since 1871. Although it was New Zealand's first street tramway dedicated for passenger use.

On its opening day, the tramway operated four steam trams, each coupled with passenger trailers to provide seating for commuters. In addition to the steam-powered vehicles, the company also ran two horse-drawn cars to accommodate additional passengers. At its peak, the tramway's fleet grew to include eight steam tram engines, each costing approximately £NZ975. Each engine consumed around 78 cwt of coal for 12 hours of operation.

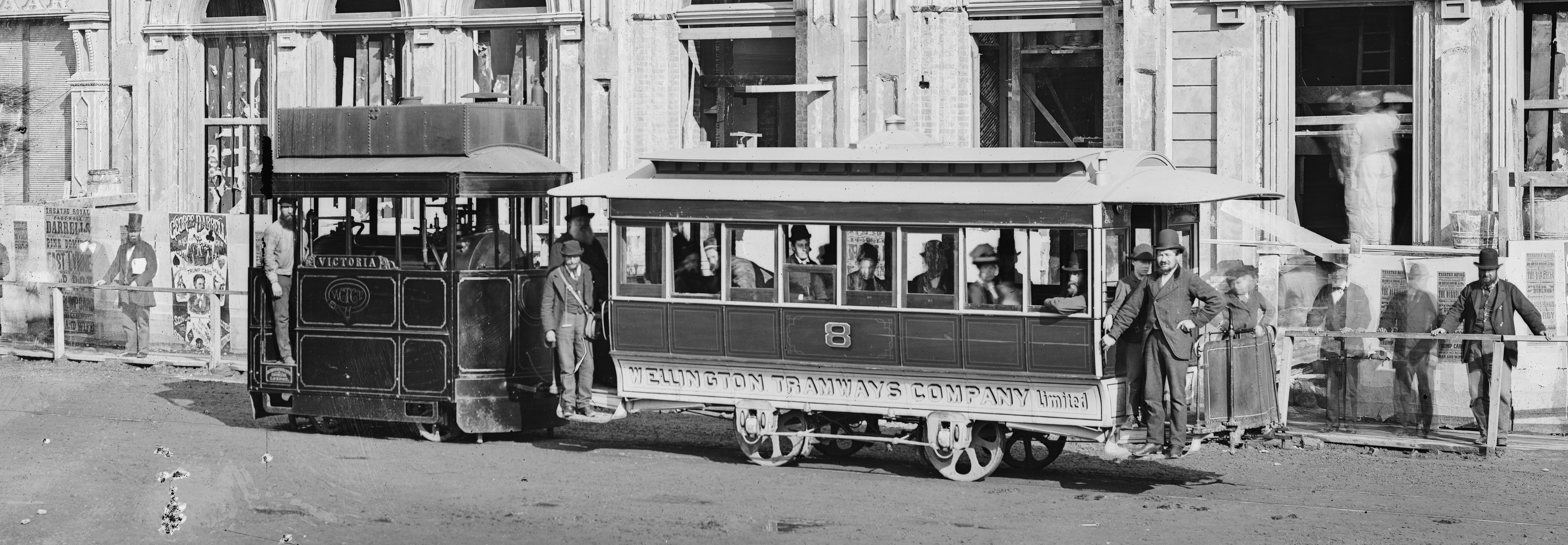
Steam tram in Lambton Quay, c. 1879

The steam trams quickly drew public complaints due to their noise, being a nuisance, soot emissions, frightened horses, and involvement in collisions, which led to civil court cases. They proved unpopular with cabmen, carters, and some residents, who convened a public meeting to voice their concerns. During the meeting, it was agreed that a formal petition would be submitted calling for the removal of steam-powered trams.

On 4 December 1879, a petition was handed over to Governor Hercules Robinson requesting the use of animal power only for Wellington's trams. Although Robinson gave the petitioners a sympathetic hearing, no further action was taken. It was alleged that cabmen deliberately blocked the way of the steam trams.

The Wellington City Tramways Company entered voluntary liquidation in 1879 because the rails were too light for the steam trams' weight. The cost to maintain the rails was too high for the company to continue, and they were to be sold to a private owner. A shareholder meeting was held on 8 January 1880 to agree that the company should be wound up voluntarily and formally. In March 1880, an auction was held, and the new owner was the sole bidder, Edward William Mills, who bid £NZ19,250 and became the director.

==== Horse trams ====
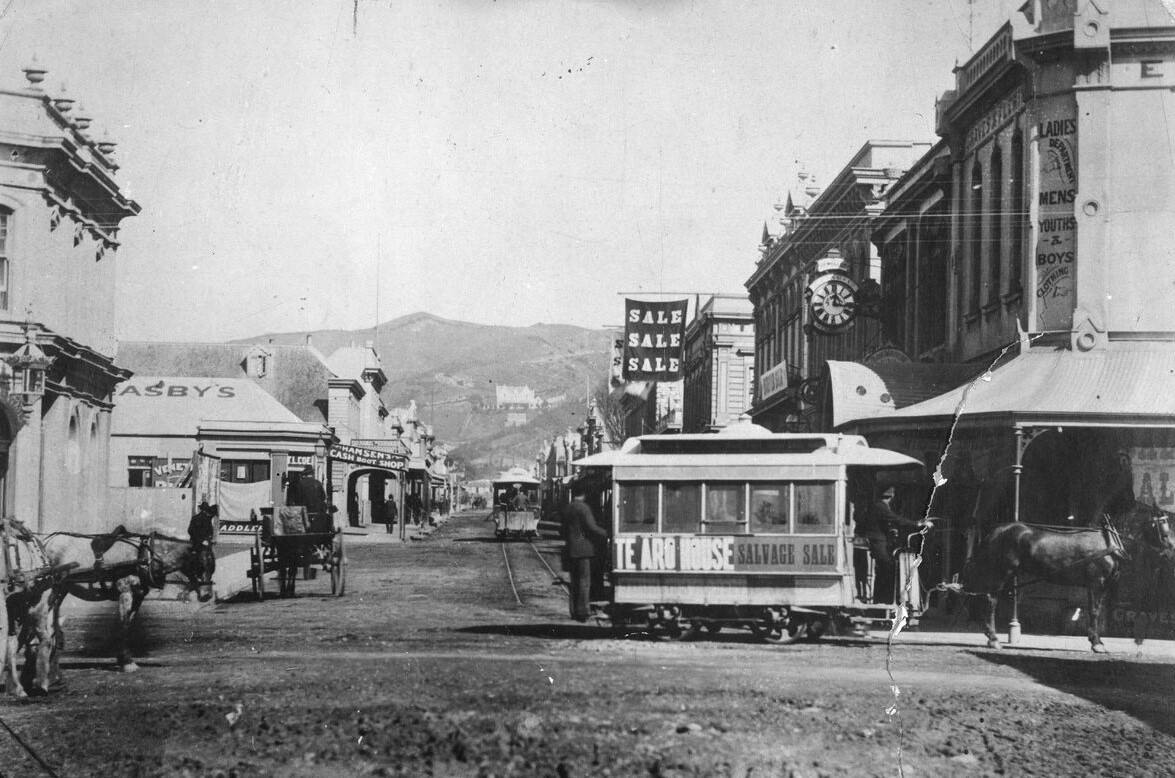
Horse trams in Cuba Street, corner of Dixon Street c. 1885

In January 1882, the introduction of horse-drawn trams led to the removal of steam trams from service. An additional route along Courtenay Place was opened. King Street Depot became a horse stable, replacing the Adelaide Road engine shed. The then-new horse stable was made to hold 50 horses and was gradually enlarged to 140 horses. The horses were brought over from the Wairarapa to pull the trams, and chaff was obtained from Sanson.

Horse-drawn trams retained the same passenger trailers as the old steam tram services. In February 1884, the old steam trams were auctioned off. However, one was retained and repurposed as a chaff cutter prepare feed for the horses, while another was sold to the Sanson Tramway. The Tramway Company's deed with the City Council was due to expire in July 1887. A council-appointed committee recommended buying the tramway. However, the Council didn't proceed at this stage.

In May 1900, the City Council held a meeting to discuss the purchase of the Wellington City Tramways, including their rolling stock, horses, tools, and rails. In June 1900, the City Council publicly announced its intention to acquire the Wellington City Tramways. On 1 October 1900, the City Council became the owner, paying £NZ19,382. The Wellington Corporation Tramways Department was established to manage the tram service. Although the City Council took over the tram company, the street lease did not expire until 1902.

=== Electric era: 1901–1964 ===
==== Electrification ====
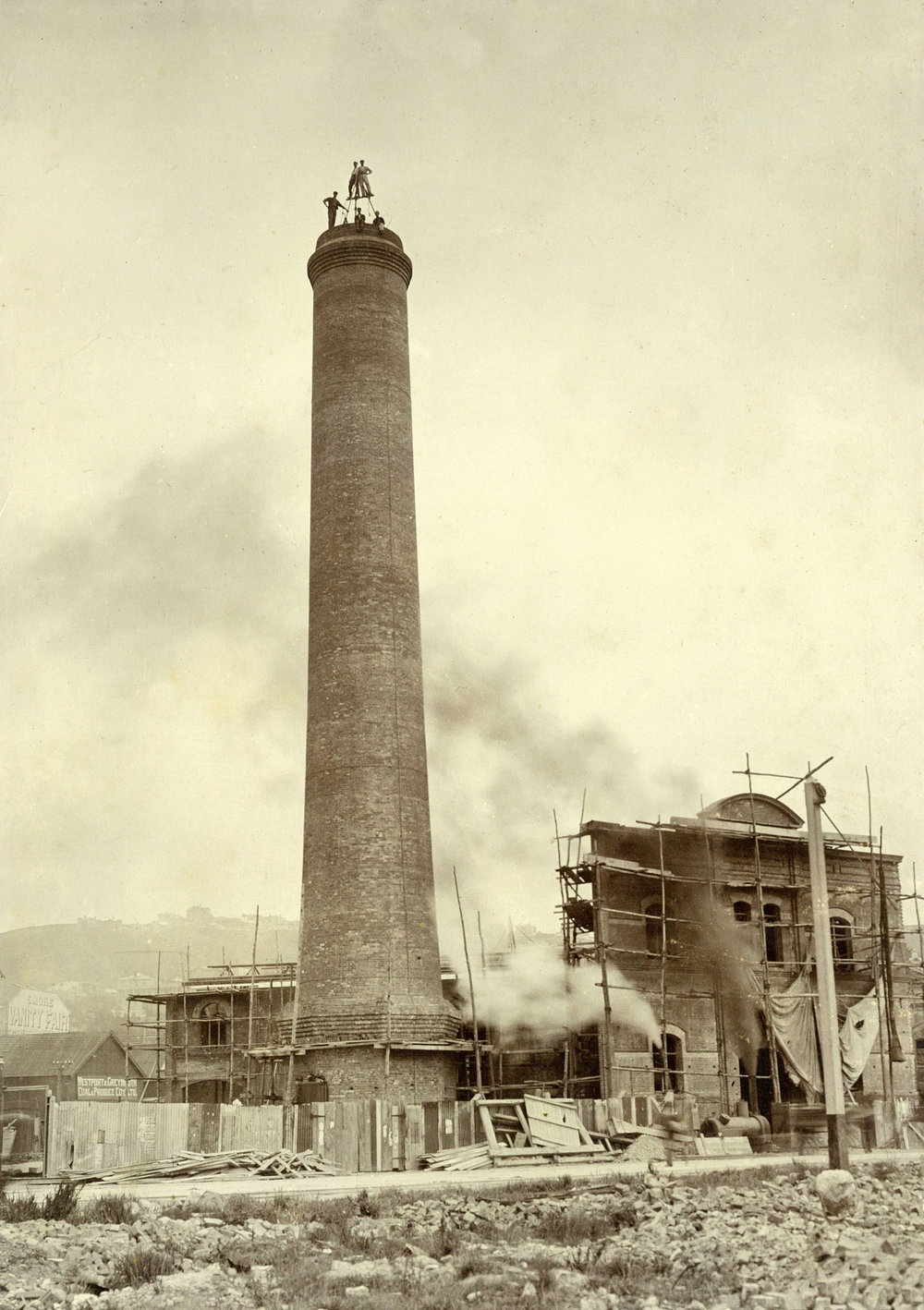
Bricklayers conduct a 'topping off' ceremony to mark their completion of the chimney of the tramway's coal-fired power station, c. 1903.

In October 1900, Councillor Luke moved a motion to investigate the cost of electrification of the existing lines. The City Council sent officers to the United States and England to investigate electrification. Reports from these countries highlighted the innovation of trams powered by electricity, with current supplied through overhead wires. In response to these reports, the City Council began conducting enquiries into the electrification and extension of the tramway. The City Council obtained the opinion of W.G. Bingham, an engineer, as well as other sources, to assist the city engineer in preparing a report. By 1901, the city engineer finished his report and made a recommendation to the City Council, and they decided to implement electric trams.

In April 1901, plans for the project were presented to the city's ratepayers, who unanimously approved the initiative. In February 1902, the ratepayers voted in a poll and approved the City Council to borrowed £NZ225,000 through the Tramways Department. The funds were used for the extension and electrification of the tramway network. A contract was signed in the same year to electrified the system.

The tracks were to be converted to the then-new 4 ft (1,219 mm) gauge, which was adopted because of the narrow streets in Wellington Central. The trams used electric power to move along rails, requiring extensive infrastructure like overhead wires and tram poles. A London-based firm was awarded £NZ110,000 to lay tracks, install the overhead wire, provide wooden blocks, and set up tram poles. The electric system featured 33 trams, and about half were double-deck vehicles manufactured in England.

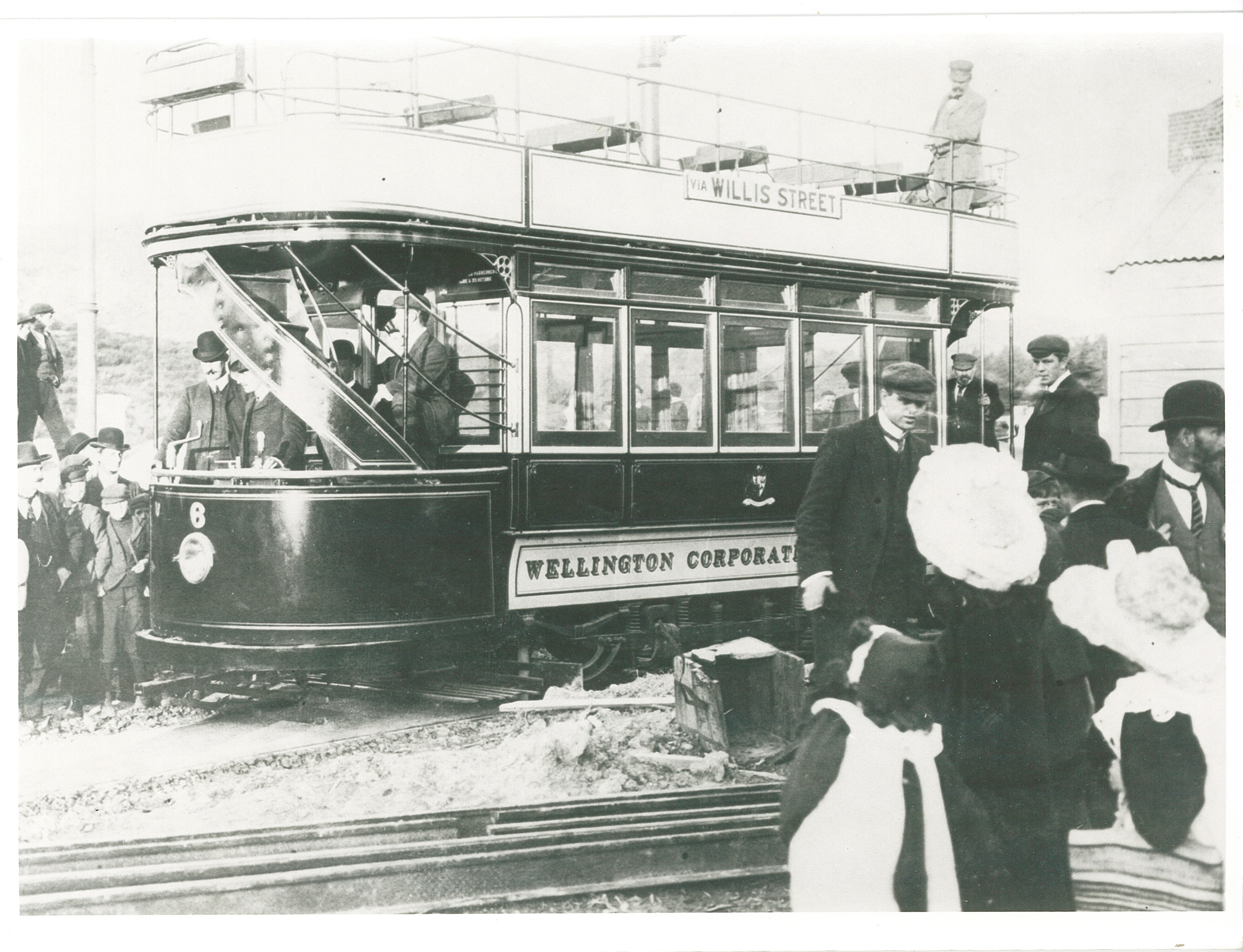
A crowd gathered around the first electric tram in Wellington on the opening day, c. 1904.

Tram poles were made of steel sections with a slightly tapered diameter. Topped with a ball and spike finial for ornamental and water protection, bracket arms carried a double insulation system for overhead wires to power them to 500-550 volts. The tram poles were 25 feet tall, and workers used derricks to lift the poles and drop them through the holes they made in the footpath, where they were then encased in six feet of concrete.

As the electric trams were being introduced to Wellington, tram poles became a means of ornamentation of the city, resulting in elaborately designed poles. Decorative steel centre poles were embellished with wrought ironwork. On less central streets, tram poles were simpler in design but still included moulded bases, ferrules, and finials, typically featuring a ball and spike style.

The tram utilised various devices to collect power from overhead lines, with a roof-mounted trolley pole being the most common—the trolley pole connected to the overhead line was maintained by pressure from the spring-loaded trolley base. City of Wellington Electric Light and Power Company was commissioned to operate a £NZ25,000 coal-fired steam plant on Jervois Quay, supplying "white coal" to power the tramcar fleet.

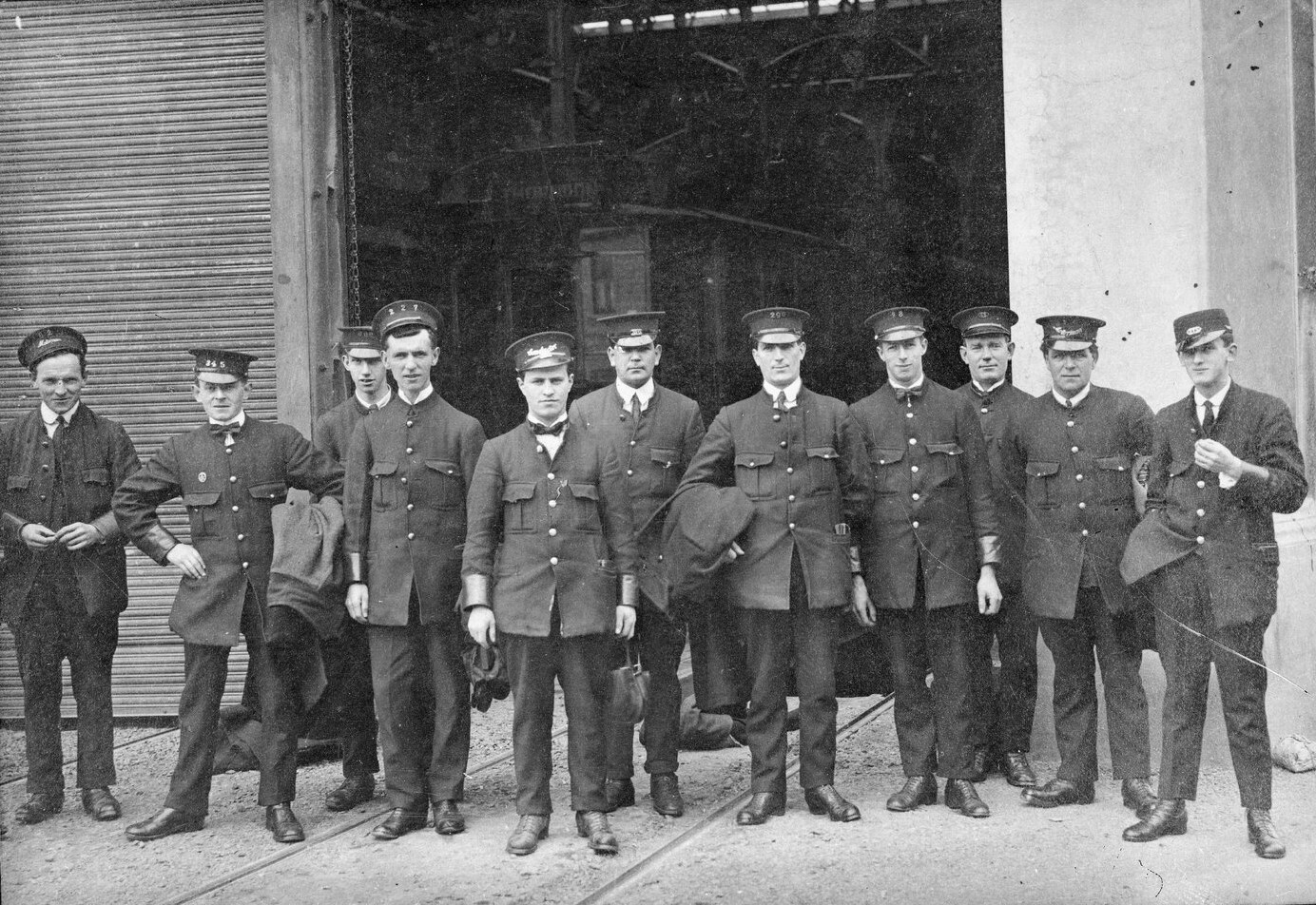
Tram drivers in their uniform supplied by the city council c. 1914

On 29 October 1902, the first tracks were laid by an army of up to 300 unskilled labourers, often referred to as "navvies", who were paid a shilling an hour. They tore up city streets and laid rails, inserting squares of Australian hardwood, specifically jarrah, were placed to soak in tar. The work was demanding, with long hours; the men started at 4:00 AM and finished at 11:00 PM. By January 1904, the first ten tramcars had arrived from England.

Men who would run the then-new electric trams for the city were provided uniforms that included a cap, overcoat, oilskin, tunic, trousers, and leggings, costing the Tramways Department £NZ1,000 per year to outfit them all.

The first trial run of the electric tram took place on the evening of 8 June 1904. A double-decker tram moved down Riddiford Street and Adelaide Road before returning to the tram shed, while residents opened their doors and windows to watch the tram pass by. The first public run occurred from Newtown to the Basin Reserve on 30 June 1904. Weeks after the electric trams began operating, the horse tram service was retired. In 1904, the City Council decided to clear out and sell all horses, tramcars, equipment, and anything else used in the old horse-drawn tram service to the public.

==== Expansion ====
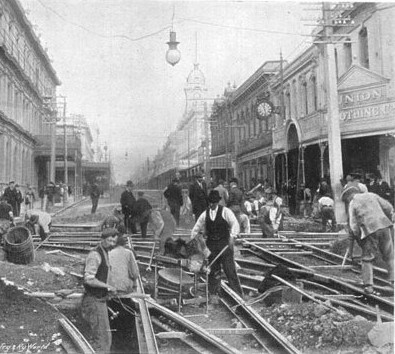
The laying of tram tracks on Cuba Street, Wellington, c. 1904

In 1904, extensions were made to Courtenay Place, Cuba and Wallace Street, Aro Street, Oriental Bay, and Tinakori Road. The following year, a line was constructed through Newtown and Berhampore to Island Bay, and the year after, from the Te Aro line to Brooklyn.

In 1904, the City Council's engineer recommended building a tram tunnel through Mount Victoria to Hataitai, extending as far as Kilbirnie. A double-track tunnel was initially proposed, but this plan was never implemented. The final design for the single-track tunnel would measure 1,273 feet in length, with a height of 17 feet 6 inches and a width of 12 feet at the base and was to include laying an 8-inch water supply main from the city to Kilbirnie through the tunnel. Notably, it does not have a pedestrian walkway and the City Council would fine £5 for anyone trespassing in the tunnel.

Construction of the tunnel began in October 1905, with the first sod turned by Wellington Mayor Thomas William Hislop on 18 October at Kilbirnie with Prime Minister Richard Seddon, who also attended the ceremony. Work progressed on the Pirie Street side a week later with both teams meeting in the middle of 17 May that year. Following this, work commenced on enlarging the tunnel and bricking the walls in July. During the very last weeks before completion, a partial collapse of the earth killed three men. The Hataitai tunnel cost £NZ70,000, it took over a year to complete, and involved a hundred miners working in three shifts, 25 bricklayers and apprentices, as well as teams of drivers and truckers to remove the spoil. The first trial run of a tram through the tunnel occurred on 12 April 1907, and passenger services officially started a few days later, on 16 April. This enabled the extension of the tramway service to Kilbirnie, Miramar, and Seatoun.

The Miramar Borough Council investigated extending the tramway through Miramar to Seatoun via a tunnel, with a cost of £23,000. Funding contributions came from both local figures and syndicates, the Crawford's and estate companies. The contract for the tunnel was signed on 21 August 1906, and construction begun soon after. However, construction delays left both the council and the public dissatisfied with the progress. The project was understaffed, and the death of the chief contractor, Jonathan Sanders, contributed to the stall in construction. In December 1907, the Seatoun tunnel was open, the tunnel is 470 feet in length and 27 feet in width and flanked by twin footpaths. When the trams arrived at Seatoun, it ended the ferries services there.

In 1907, the Tinakori Road line was extended westward towards Karori, reaching Karori Cemetery. In February 1911, the line to Karori was extended up Church Hill to Karori Park. The City boundary was at the Wellington Botanic Garden in Tinakori Road and the Karori Borough Council was responsible past the Gardens. As with the Melrose Borough Council in 1903, the one council's operation of the city tramways was a factor in the amalgamation of Karori Borough Council with the Wellington City Council in 1920

Construction of the new track then slowed but did not stop. In 1909, a line was built from Kilbirnie to Lyall Bay and another from Tinakori Road to Wadestown in 1911. By 1910, the tram tracks extended for 35.5 km, with nearly a third being double-tracked.In April 1914, the Newtown tram line was extended beyond the tram barns to the Newtown Park Zoo. In 1915, a line connected Newtown with Kilbirnie via Constable Street and Crawford Road. In 1911, two tramcars were constructed by the Tramways Department for freight and parcel services between the city and the suburbs, and depots were established throughout the city. The freight trams transported various commodities, including food, coal, beer, and passengers' suitcases from the trains.

==== Heyday ====
Wellington tram patronage
FY	Patronage	±% p.a.
1882	3,000,000	—
1910	22,000,000	+7.38%
1930	46,581,456	+3.82%
1934	34,800,000	−7.03%
1939	44,000,000	+4.80%
1940	48,200,000	+9.55%
1943	62,000,000	+8.75%
1947	55,781,282	−2.61%
1965	0	−100.00%
Source: 1882, 1910, 1930, 1934, 1939-1940, 1943, 1947

Many of Wellington's suburbs were once remote, semi-rural areas with small populations. However, their development and growth significantly improved after the introduction of trams that connected these suburbs to the city. For instance, Brooklyn and Wadestown did not expand considerably until the tramways were opened, which conquered the steep slopes and made these areas more accessible and attractive places to live. Historian John Struthers cites the installation of the tramway in Seatoun integral for its development and population growth.

Along tram routes, development driven by residential speculators flourished, with the proximity to the tram being a crucial factor in determining housing intensity. The introduction of trams to the outer city also significantly transformed the social life of the residents. A new focus on leisure for the urban worker who could take a tram out to Lyall Bay to swim, sunbathe, take a seaside stroll or have picnics on their days off.

When not in service, the trams were stored at several depots: Kilbirnie, Newtown, Thorndon, Chaffers Street, and Karori, where maintenance staff inspected and serviced them. The tramway workers took great pride in their organisation. They formed rugby, cricket, and tennis teams and held picnics and dances. The Tramway Band was well known throughout Wellington, and they played at local events.

In 1924, a case went to the Court of Appeal of New Zealand challenging the use of eminent domain to secure right-of-ways for tracks. In Boyd v Mayor of Wellington, the court found that, although the government forced the sale of land improperly, it had acted in good faith, so the sale was not reversed.

On 4 June 1929, the last new line was completed, a branch of the Karori line through a tunnel to Northland. The suburban tram system extensions has cost the City Council £NZ1,500,000 from 1905 to 1929.

On 22 November 1933, the Fiducia tram was unveiled to the public during the New Zealand National Confidence Carnival to raise money for the Mayor's distress fund. Fiducia is a Latin word that means "trust" or "confidence". A 1935 demonstration by a Fiducia tram convinced the speaker and members of the Legislative Council that modern trams were silent. The Fiducia tram was introduced to the streets of Wellington in 1937. From 1935 to 1952, a total of 28 Fiducia trams were built at the Kilbirnie Workshop. In total, 274 trams were constructed: 14 were horse-drawn, 260 were electric passenger trams, and two were for freight transport. The Fiducia model was the last to be constructed in New Zealand and the final one to operate during the last year of tram services.

Finally, in 1940, a shorter route was opened up Bowen Street to the western suburbs of Karori and Northland instead of the route via Tinakori Road. This had been proposed since 1907 and 1912, but successive prime ministers (Ward and Massey) opposed noisy trams using Bowen Street or Hill Street close to parliament.

==== The war years ====
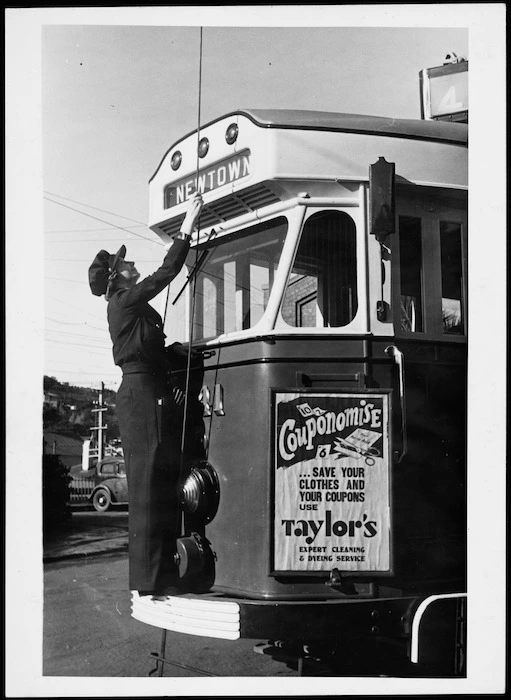
A "conductorette" placing the pole on the wire, Wellington, c. 1942

During World War 2, women helped to address labour shortages in Wellington but faced challenges. In mid-1941, Wellington's City Council encountered a shortage of conductors, with passengers being left at stops while overcrowded trams passed by. The City Council considered employing women as conductors but preferred to avoid additional costs for restrooms by having male conductors work overtime during peak hours. However, some councillors questioned the delay in hiring women, and Mrs. Knox Gilmer argued that women would not require elaborate restroom facilities.

In 1941, the Tramways Department hired its first "tram girls," providing them with uniforms consisting of navy serge peaked caps adorned with a badge, double-breasted greatcoats, trousers, and "battledress" tops modelled after army's uniforms at the time. Notably, only women in Wellington were permitted to wear trousers. Provincial candidates were required to be tall, slim, and strong to reach bells and navigate crowds, with some being rejected due to their short or wide stature. The women worked alongside men on equal pay, both earning £5 0s 6d for a 40-hour week, with additional pay for overtime or broken shifts could add a pound or two.

By 1944, there were 175 women conductors, accounting for nearly a third of the total Tramways staff, but the department wanted 200, and an inspector went to New Plymouth, Whanganui and Napier to interview recruits. Competition among different offices led to many women being recruited as "conductorettes." Women performed the cleaning of trams at night at the depot and were responsible for clipping tickets. But women were not accepted as drivers of trams, because of heavy work on hill routes nor were they allowed to repair the rails.

Repairs and upgrades were limited due to wartime shortages, leading to the deterioration of tram tracks. The road surface around the rails broke down because of vibrations, and during wet weather, increasingly large puddles formed, creating squelching sounds as each tram passed. These conditions eroded the foundations of the rails.

In July 1943, an advertisement sought women aged 25 to 40 to do tram track maintenance, both full-time and part-time. Although the Wellington City Council Works Committee assured applicants that they would not be involved in heavy labor, like lifting or digging up rails, they would instead be responsible for tasks such as sealing and tamping. An engineer from the department made a statement regarding the employment of women on the tram track maintenance. He said, "I do not like the idea of women being employed in this work... it would benefit the Tramways Department to hire men instead, as they would be better suited for tamping down the asphalt."

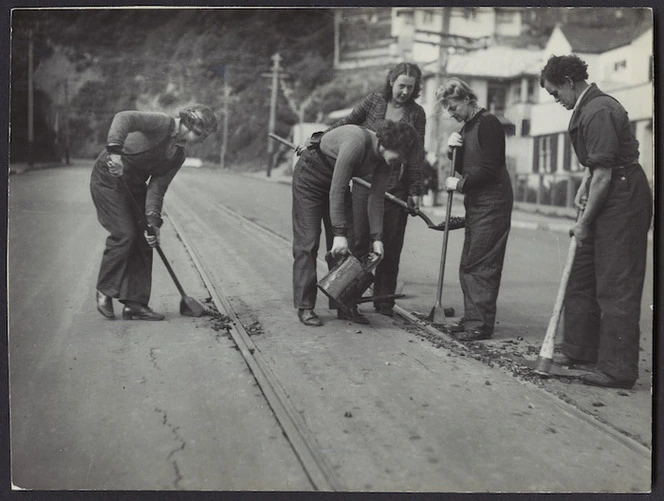
The women working on tram track maintenance on the Seatoun line were controversial, c. August 1943.

By August of that year, the first women's "pothole gang" began their work. They repaired the rough tarseal holes beside the tram tracks. One member drove a small truck, while the others took turns filling the holes with metal chips, pouring tar, and tamping down the patches while being supervised by workmen.

The women worked for less than a week on tram track maintenance. On August 20, the Minister of Industrial Manpower Angus McLagan who bowed to political pressure issued an order prohibiting the employment of women's in this role. Mayor of Wellington Thomas Hislop expressed his astonishment, commenting on the government's mismanagement of manpower. It was agreed on 21 August that the women would be diverted to more suitable occupations. Enough men were assigned to manage the repairs of tram tracks. These repairs became a priority, with 70 men, including some ex-3rd Division soldiers, directed to the task during 1944.

During the war years, the trams experienced their busiest period ever, as commuting American servicemen and petrol rationing drove passenger numbers close to 63 million in 1944. To accommodate more passengers, the centre seats in the tram were removed, creating space for an additional 10 people. The war years had shown that New Zealanders' lives continued almost without needing a car.

== Demise ==
=== Abandonment ===
In 1925, the tram freight and parcel services were discontinued because of competition from motor vehicles. One of the freight trams was scrapped in 1955, and the other was converted into a track grinder in the 1920s and withdrawn from service with the closing of the system in 1964. In early 1945, after reviewing the report from the General Manager of the Transport and Electricity Departments, the City Council announced plans to convert one of the tram routes to single-operator trolleybuses. The route selected was between the Railway Station and Oriental Bay, with extensions to Roseneath and Hataitai at one end, and to Aotea Quay at the northern end. Ten trolleybus chassis and overhead equipment were ordered from Britain. The first of these vehicles to be put into service on the Roseneath route was in June 1949.

It was decided to replace the trams with buses and trolleybuses, which were considered more advanced and better suited to the city's needs. Several factors influenced this decision, including Wellington's challenging topography, the decline in passenger numbers after World War II, and the rise of operational costs of maintaining and purchasing trams and track renewals. Additionally, the lack of track maintenance during the war meant that the capital expenditure required to bring the tracks up to standard far exceeded the cost of purchasing replacement buses, even though buses generally have a much shorter lifespan.

The city's streets are often steep, winding, and narrow, making the greater manoeuvrability of buses a significant advantage. Some city councillors said that trams were uncomfortable and slow and that the necessary spare parts were no longer being manufactured. However, Bob Stott of Rails highlighted that European trams were both fast and comfortable and that spare parts for them were still available, yet the City Council overlooked these options. Trams were increasingly viewed as outdated after World War II. Meanwhile, cars and buses were seen as the future for Wellington.

In 1948, the City Council determined that improved access to Wadestown was necessary. To implement this plan, the City Council decided to discontinue the tram service and replace it with diesel buses until the new roads were completed, which would then accommodate cars and trolleybuses that were on order. This change would allow for the tram right-of-way to be widened and paved for bus and car use. On 9 September 1953, the City Council announced that the Northland trams would be converted to buses from 21 September. However, a week later, the announced decision was rescinded because the City Council had not obtained the necessary Order in Council from the Ministry of Works. It delayed the conversion, but by 17 September 1954, it made the Northland trams the shortest-lived service for the city. In 1954, the City Council adopted the policy for the replacement of trams by buses.

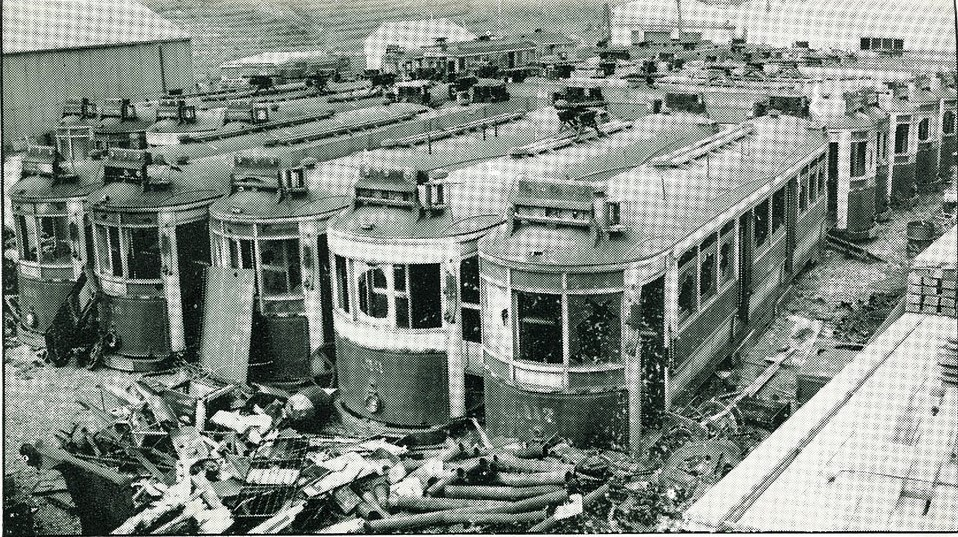
Former Wellington trams at a scrap metal dealer, c. 1964

In May 1959, a group of retail businessmen convened a meeting to protest what they described as "Wellington's traffic chaos." Councillor Max Wall, who had opposed the policy of replacing trams with buses, also attended and argued that trams should be retained at least within the central city. The meeting resolved to establish a committee to investigate the city's traffic problems and make submissions to the Wellington City Council. However, the committee later expressed dissatisfaction with the council's response to its proposals.

As a result, in August 1959, the group decided to form a new local body political ticket. In that year's Wellington City mayoral election, the Independent United Action Group made its debut. Led by Saul Goldsmith, the group fielded ten council candidates, including Ron Brierley, with the aim of preserving the city's tramways. They launched a campaign called "Save the Trams" that same year. The campaigners proposed retaining the tram line from the railway station to Courtenay Place.

The City Council passed a resolution to raise a loan of NZ£1,282,230 to complete the transition to buses, complete workshops and bus areas at Kilbirnie and Wakefield Street, and convert the Hataitai Tunnel for trolley bus operation. Goldsmith had successfully collected enough signatures to hold a referendum on the loan issue. United Action then printed posters stating, "Save the trams; keep rates down. Vote AGAINST the transport loan." On 22 June 1960, the poll passed, approving the City Council's proposal to borrow the funds necessary for converting the tram system to buses. Only 24 per cent voted that the loan received a majority of the votes: 5,057 in favour and 3,550 against.

By 1961, only 65 trams remained in service, a decrease from the 155 that had been operational in April 1956. In the 1962 Wellington City mayoral election, Goldsmith ran again in support of retaining what remained of the tramway system but finished a distant last. That same year, a petition was submitted to the City Council to retain the Hataitai service.

=== Closure ===
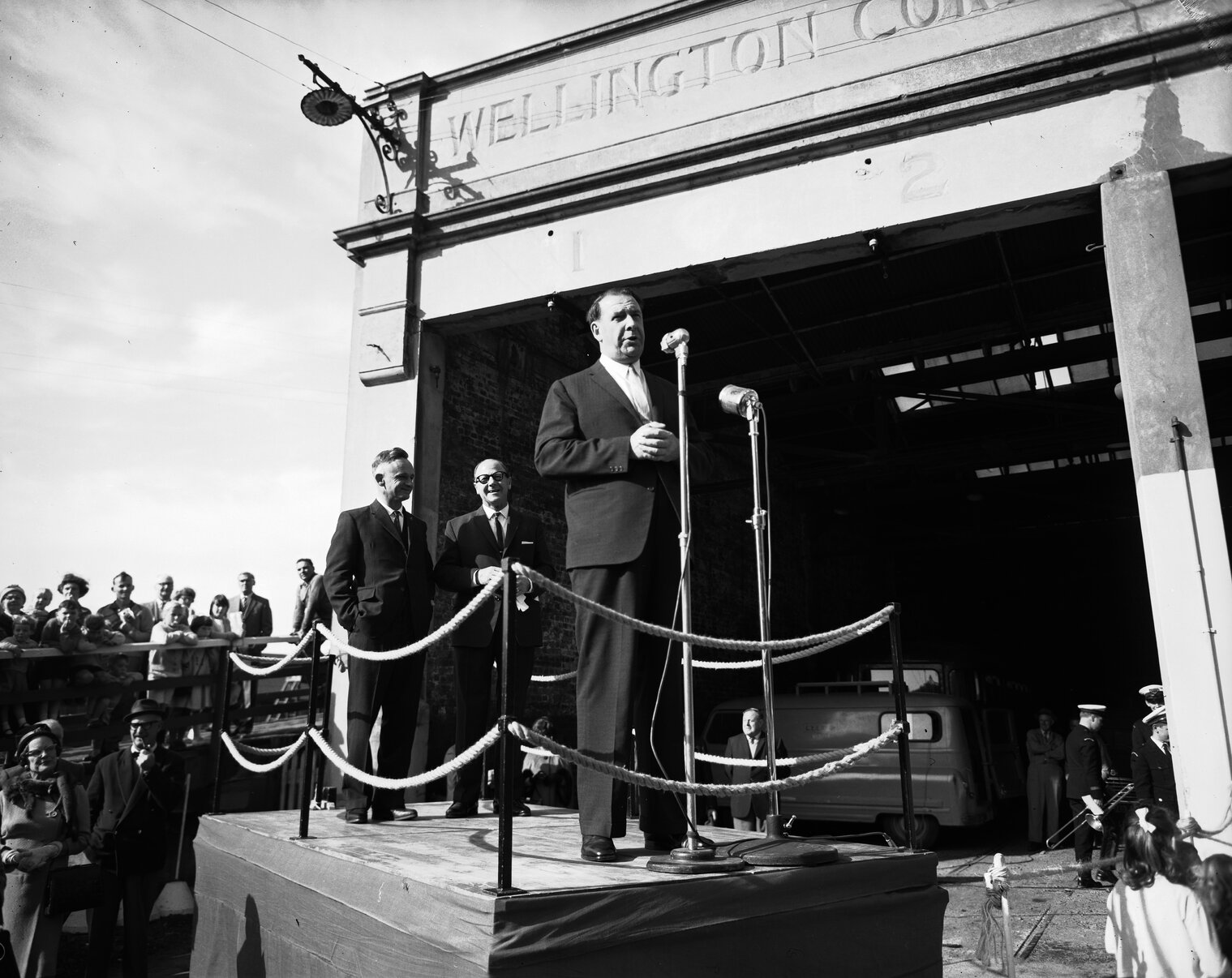
The closing ceremony at Thorndon, Mayor Frank Kitts as a speaker, c. 2 May 1964

The first major line closure came in 1949 when Wadestown closed the first of a long series of tram routes to be abandoned. The following year, the Oriental Bay line closed, with about 500 people who bid farewell to the last tram. In 1954, the Karori line (including the Northland branch) closed. In 1956, after the last tram run in Auckland, Wellington became the last regular passenger service in New Zealand. In 1957 services to Aro Street and Brooklyn ended. The construction of Wellington International Airport destroyed the route to Miramar and Seatoun. All services to the eastern suburbs had ceased by 1962, with Lyall Bay closing in 1960, Constable St/Crawford Rd in 1961, and Hataitai in 1962. The Hataitai tunnel was closed for 11 months to be converted for the trolley buses. On 17 January 1963, the City Council applied to Governor-General Bernard Fergusson for authorisation to abandon the use of trams and dismantle the tracks. In 1963, the service to Island Bay was withdrawn, leaving mainly inner-city routes. By 31 March 1964, the trams used only 14.4 km of tracks, down from 20 km from the previous year.

On 2 May 1964, the remaining tram line was officially closed with a parade that travelled from Thorndon to Newtown. Twelve trams operated during the service that morning, including three decorated trams in the final procession. Hundreds gathered to witness the final three trams traverse the streets, and photographers recorded the occasion on cameras and film.

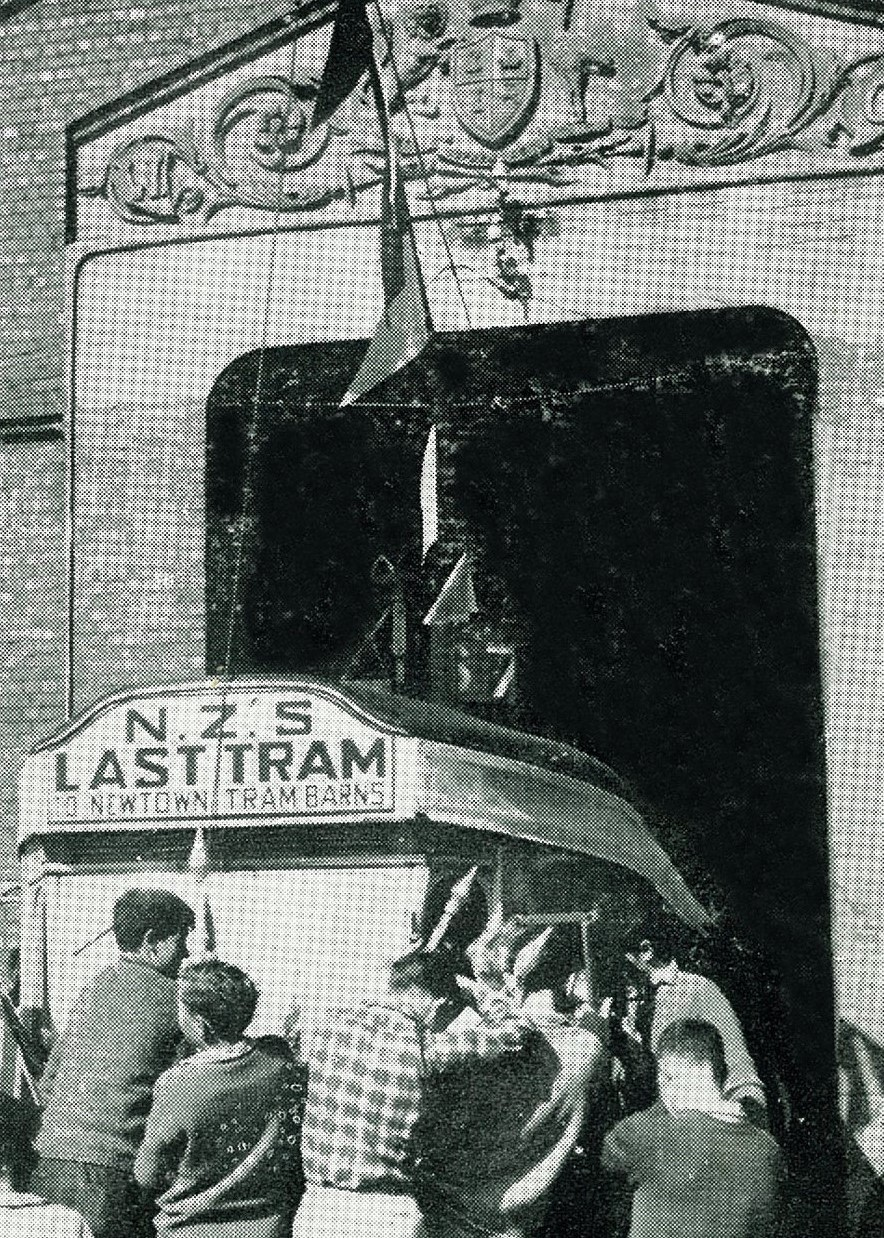
The last tram trundling into obscurity at the end of its run

The first two trams were adorned with red, white, and blue bunting, representing the colours of the New Zealand flag. Wellington's and New Zealand's last tram was uniquely decorated in black and gold, the colours of Wellington. It featured a large rosette on both the front and back, showcasing the city's coat of arms, surrounded by an arc of flags. Slogans were written on the sides of all three trams. The tram convoy was surrounded by Wellington residents listening to farewell speeches before they departed for the last time. Those who could not get souvenir tickets for the last three trams clung on to the side of the trams till shaken off, or jogged or rode a bike alongside the tracks. The last ride took 50 minutes instead of the usual 23 minutes. All along the route, people lined the streets, climbing on banks and hoardings, perching on buildings and fences, hanging out of windows and following in cars.

During a closing ceremony at Thorndon, Mayor Frank Kitts expressed his belief that the decision to discontinue trams was as a "retrograde step." However, Councillor Noel Manthel, who was responsible for the changeover and a car dealer, viewed it as a successful conclusion. In June 1960, he had stated that "trams caused difficulties in traffic and pedestrian control." Goldsmith was interview after the closing ceremony and said "But just you wait and see the trams will be back again." From 1954 to 1964 the City Council spent more than £NZ2,500,000 to remove the trams from Wellington. After the closure of the service, the City Council announced a policy allowing the purchase of any trams at a scrap value of £22 10s each and that the buyer also arrange transport for the trams. However, most of the trams were transported to Happy Valley where they were stripped of salvageable parts then intentionally set on fire, and the metal was later processed as scrap. The principle of electric transport was maintained; many of the former tram routes continued to be served by trolleybuses until 2017.

=== Removal ===
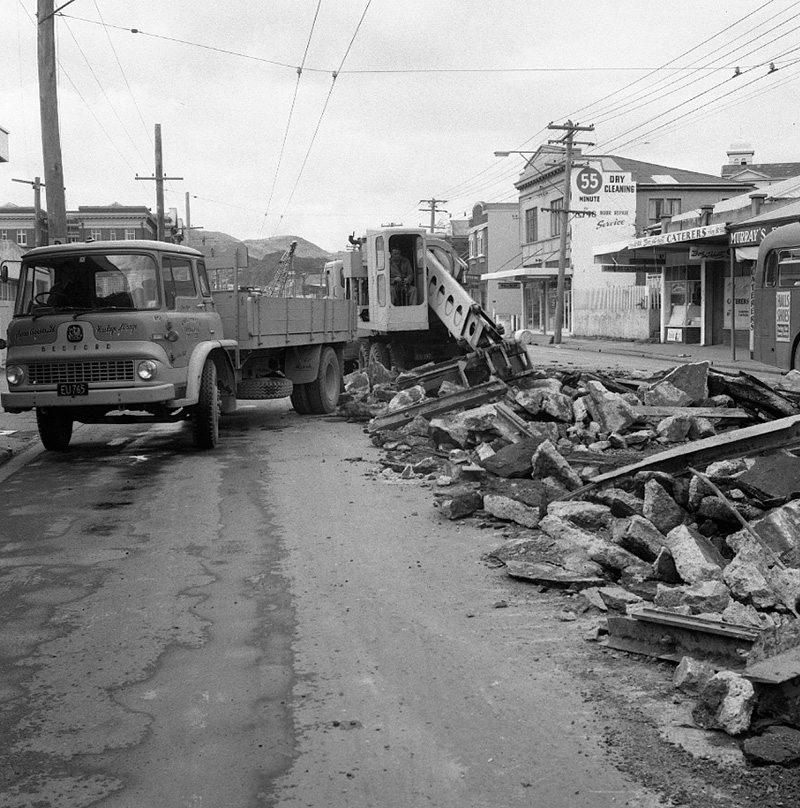
Removal of tram tracks in Newtown, c. 1965

After the close of the tram services, the tram poles were gradually removed. On 16 September 1964, the City Council adopted a report regarding removing the old tram tracks. At that time, approximately 51.50 km of track remained in the city and the surrounding suburban streets. The City Council decided to remove the rail head and then pave over the area to avoid digging up the parts of the rail set in concrete. The estimated cost for the work was NZ$1.1 million, and it was expected that the project could be completed within three years.

The City Council had until 25 March 1966 to remove the remaining tram tracks or to obtain an extension from the Minister of Works. However, after the paving work was completed on Willis Street, surface cracking occurred, indicating that the remaining tracks needed to be removed and repaved.

In August 1964, Goldsmith attempted to prevent the City Council from sealing over the tram tracks between the Railway Station and Courtenay Place, hoping to keep them available for future tram use. A meeting was held in September, and the City Council ultimately decided to proceed with the removal of the tracks. The tracks under the road would be removed progressively over the years as road upgrades occurred. Recently, track segments were removed in 2010 at Manners Mall and in 2024 at the intersection of Tinakori Road and Thorndon Quay during roadworks.

== Post-closure: 1965-present ==
=== Queen Elizabeth Park Tramway ===
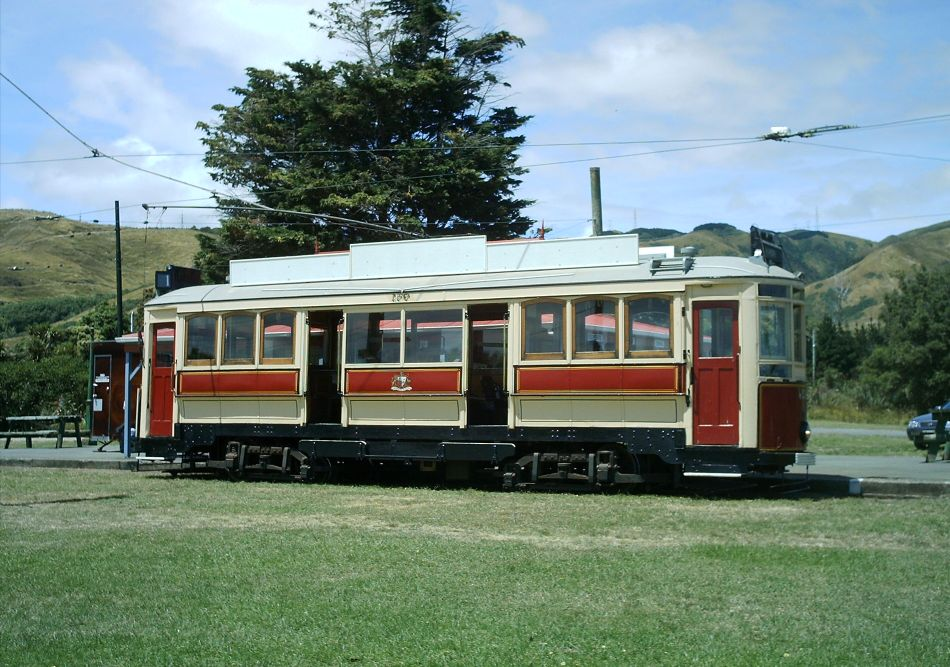
A former Wellington tram (Double Saloon No. 159, built 1925) at the Wellington Tramway Museum

Some of Wellington's old trams have been preserved. They are now in operation at the Wellington Tramway Museum at Queen Elizabeth Park in Paekākāriki on the Kāpiti Coast. The museum maintains nearly 2 km (1.2 mi) of 4-foot (1219mm) gauge track.

=== Proposed systems ===
==== Historical proposals ====
Proposals to lay down tracks for a tram system for the region date back to 1900, when Thomas Wilford advocated for a tramway from Petone to Taitā. The boroughs of Petone and Lower Hutt took steps in 1904 to explore the possibility of an electric tramway. They formed a tramway board, then they made plans for a line along Jackson Street, which would serve as a feeder to and from the Petone railway station. However, interest from the neighbouring borough led to a proposal for a combined tramway system. In 1905, the Hutt Valley Tramway Board received a proposal from Tommy Taylor to install tramways, and the Wellington Meat Company would supply electricity for the system. The Hutt Valley tramway could serve as a mixed goods route, according to a 1909 proposal. The tramway board proposed to take a loan of £NZ80,000 to build the tramway but needed the ratepayers to head to the polls and vote for its approval. Ultimately, a poll of ratepayers rejected the scheme.

==== Initial proposals ====
In the 1965 local election, Goldsmith ran under the police to return the trams to Wellington. United Action caught interest during its campaign, with a series of open-air soapbox addresses to lunch-hour crowds on the lawns of Civic Square. Neither Labour nor Citizens' Association candidates drew worthwhile audiences to their meetings. But the return of the tram policy of Goldsmith proved unattractive; all candidates were heavily defeated, thousands of votes below their nearest Labour or Citizens opponents.

Occasionally, it has been suggested that trams should return to Wellington, either in a modern form or as a historical display. As early as 1979, converting the Johnsonville Railway line to a tram operation was suggested. Several individuals and community groups were submitting suggestions to the Wellington Regional Council and City Councils, highlighting the potential of light rail transit in light of revival in North America and Europe during the 1980s.

The most detailed and publicised effort by civil society to promote rail access was Transport 2000's 'Superlink' proposal, introduced in 1992 through booklets and pamphlets. The 'Superlink' plan proposed converting the Johnsonville line to light rail and extending the system to the Airport and Karori via a tunnel from Holloway Road in Aro Valley to Appleton Park, it won the endorsement of many locals and some politicians. The following year, the Regional Council, announced a light rail plan which was also welcomed by the city. In 1995, a joint study commissioned by the City and Regional Councils called the Works/MVA report of 1995 proposed a light rail route that would run from the Wellington Railway Station along the "Golden Mile" to Courtenay Place. This proposal suggested that the light rail would extend all suburban rail lines, sharing tracks with heavy rail.

An associated plan by the City Council that almost succeeded was a heritage tramway, similar to Christchurch, looping through the developing waterfront area and sharing light rail tracks along the "Golden Mile." A 2.2 km route was proposed to be constructed in two stages, with a total estimated cost of NZ$6.7 million. The first stage of the heritage tramway was projected to cost NZ$3 million. The plan was to complete the first stage of the heritage tramway by September 1995, and it would have used two trams to run every 10 minutes, with the Wellington Tramway Museum supplying the trams. In the second stage, two more trams were to be provided for service; they were to be imported from Hong Kong. Some track foundation work was done in 1995. That was the last of that activity as the plan was ultimately scrapped.

==== Modern proposals ====
More recently, following the 2010 mayoral elections, Mayor Celia Wade-Brown pledged to investigate light rail between Wellington Station and the airport. In August 2017 the Green Party updated its transport policy to introduce light rail from the city centre to Newtown by 2025 and the airport by 2027. Mayor Justin Lester reaffirmed his support for light rail along the "Golden Mile" in 2018.

In 2022, the New Zealand government committed NZ$7.4 billion to a project called Let's Get Wellington Moving, which included a light rail that would have run from the Wellington city centre to Courtenay Place, then past the Wellington Hospital to the south coast at Island Bay. The light rail would have had dedicated lanes in some parts of the network, reduce congestion, and make it easier to move around the city. The southern light rail option was chosen due to its potential for new housing and neighbourhood growth. Waka Kotahi purchased land for a light rail station near the Basin Reserve in October 2023. In mid-December 2023, the Minister of Transport, Simeon Brown, ordered the Waka Kotahi to cease funding. The National-led coalition government decided to build and fund a second Mount Victoria tunnel and upgrade the Basin Reserve instead.

=== Remnants ===
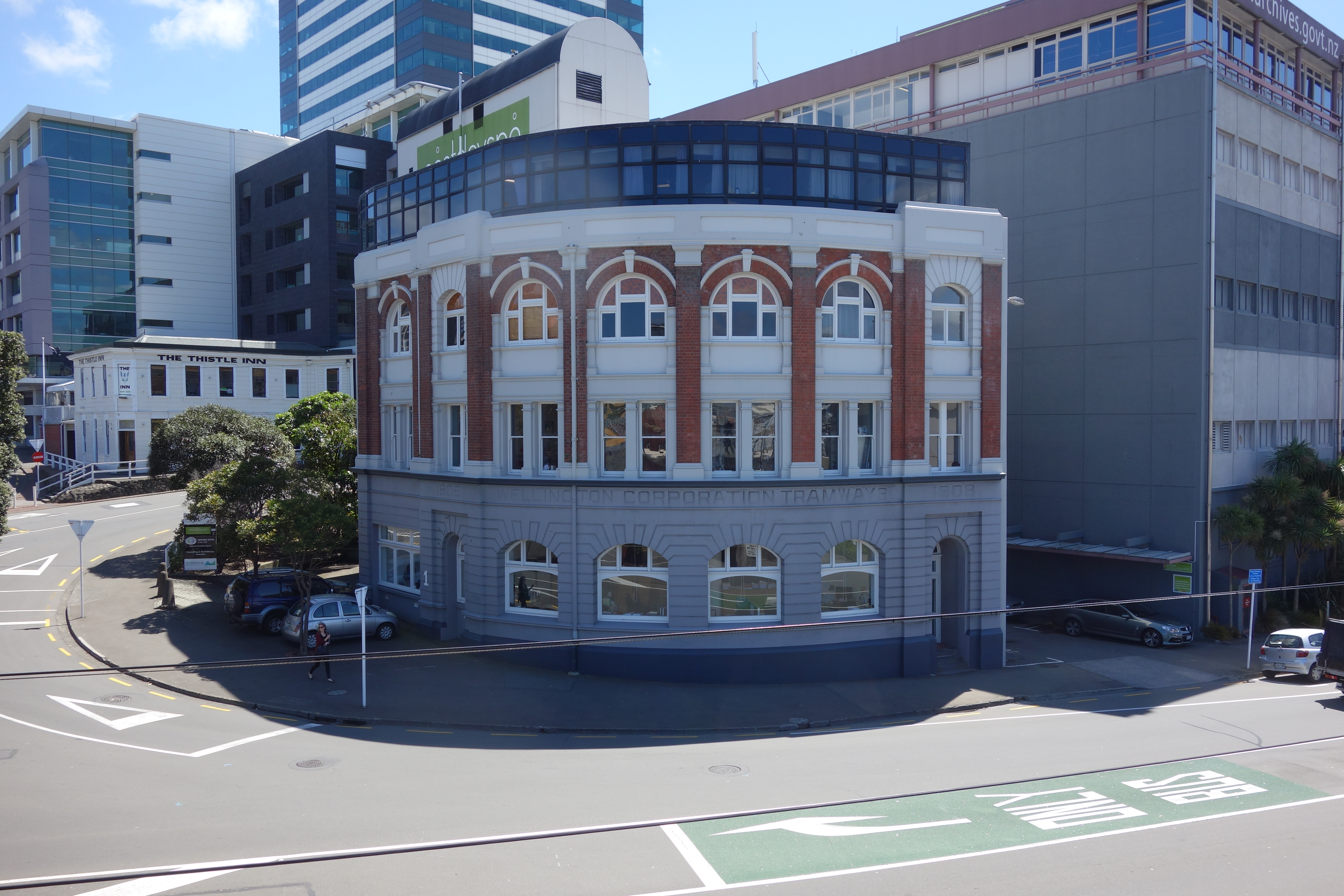
Wellington Corporation Tramways, corner of Thorndon Quay and Mulgrave Street

Around the city, it is still possible to see buildings associated with the system. The most prominent and largest remaining sites are the Kilbirnie workshops, although the land area has gradually decreased. A retirement village has now replaced what used to be a large outdoor storage yard. However, the major brick structures from the former Tram workshops remain largely unchanged.

The Tramway Hotel on Adelaide Road opened soon after the tram service began. It is located at the end of the original tram line. Nearby is Brown Street, named after Samuel Brown, the contractor who laid the original track. There is the old tramway office opposite the Lambton Quay entrance to the Railway Station.

The Taj Mahal is located on the median strip between Kent and Cambridge Terraces and Courtenay Place and Wakefield Street. It was constructed in 1928 and opened in July 1929 as public toilets for tram passengers.

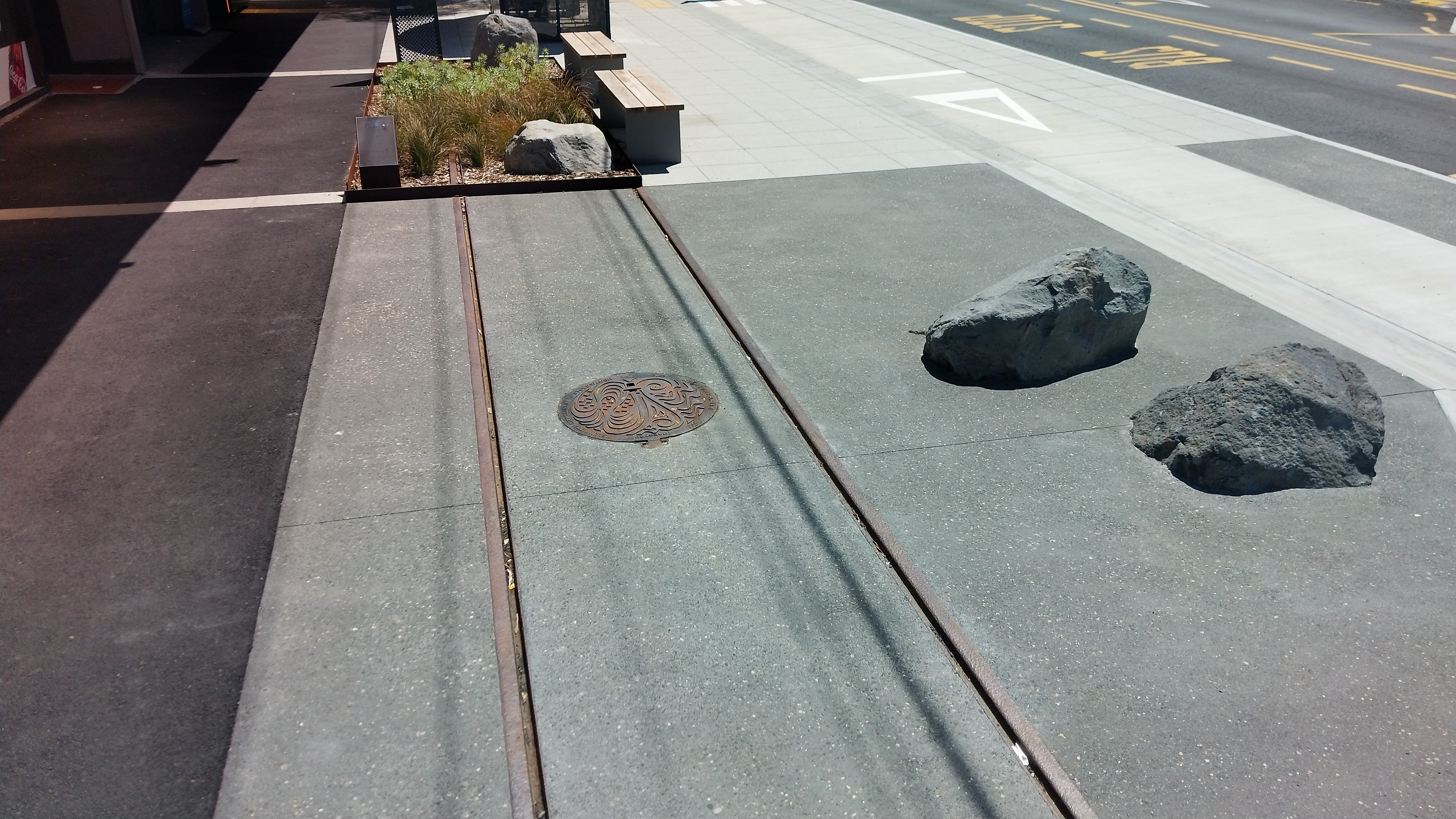
Tram tracks on the Parade in Island Bay, c. 2025

Tram return loops are located near the Newtown Park Zoo and one in Miramar. Several weather shelters can be found scattered around the city, including one at the Newtown Park Zoo loop and others in Wadestown, Miramar, and Oriental Bay. Additionally, there is a former Tram Office that once served as the booking office for the Tramways Department. On the corner of Wakefield Street and Jervois Quay is the last known remaining tram pole in Wellington to remain in situ and the only one to in New Zealand to retain the brackets to which the overhead wires were attached.

In 2024, the city council laid historic tram tracks on The Parade in Island Bay as part of a village upgrade to represent the period when trams ran along the street and the impact they had on the suburb's development from 1905. The Wellington Tramway Museum had agreed to provide two ten-metre-long rails for the street display on The Parade. The museum prepared the rails, trimming them to the required length, drilling holes, fitting tie bars, cleaning rust, and painting the rail tops. An interpretation panel was set up to explain the history of trams in the area.

== List of dates ==
The years of opening and closing of various tram routes are:

Route	Opened	Closed	Remarks
Aro Street	1904	1957	
Brooklyn	1906	1957	
Hataitai	1907	28 October 1962	
Hataitai/Kilbirnie/Miramar	1907	1957	via Hataitai tram tunnel
Island Bay	1905	1963	
Karori	1907	1954	
Kilbirnie	1915	1961	via Crawford Road
Lyall Bay	1911	1960	
Newtown/Thorndon	1904	2 May 1964	
Northland	1929	1954	branch of Karori route
Oriental Bay	1904	1950	
Seatoun	1907	1958	
Tinakori Road	1904	1949	extended to Karori
Wadestown	1911	1949	

== In popular culture ==
The 1992 comedy splatter film Braindead features several shots of trams, overhead wires, and model tramlines. The production designers created a miniature to reproduce the Newtown tramway for the film. Many artists and illustrators have created works depicting the tramways, including murals in the Wellington suburbs of Oriental Bay and Kilbirnie, as well as oil paintings by William Stewart that capture impressions of the steam and electric trams.

== See also ==
- Trams in New Zealand
- Christchurch tramway system
- Light rail in Auckland
- Public transport in the Wellington Region
- Public transport in New Zealand
