= 1962 Wellington mayoral election =

New Zealand local election

← 1959	13 October 1962	1965 →
- Turnout: 34,031 (46.4%)
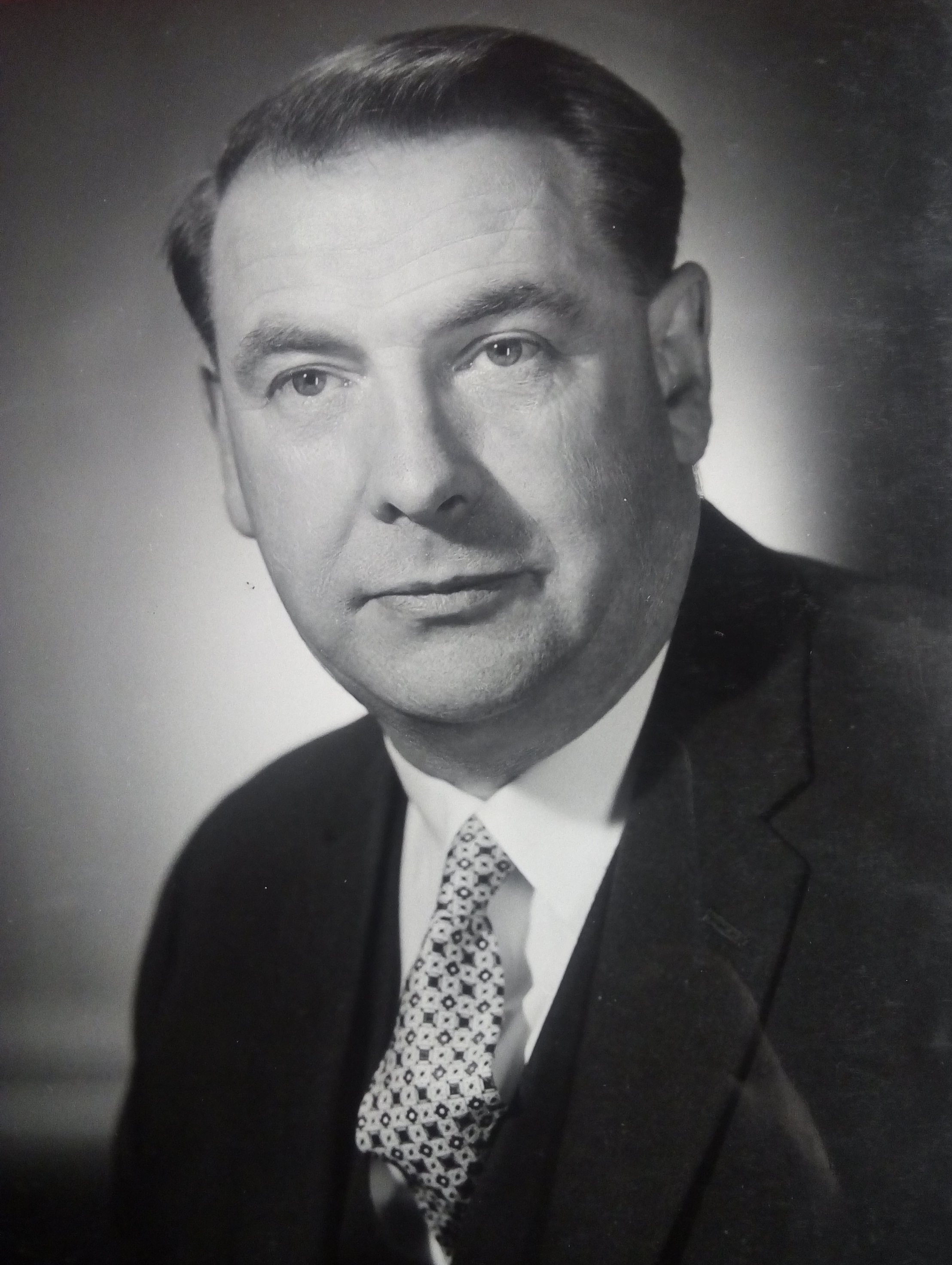

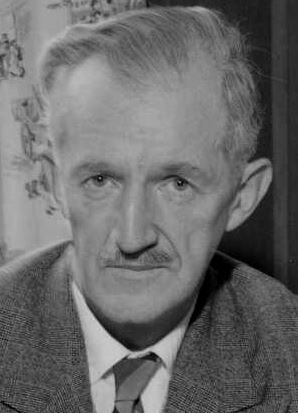
Candidate	Frank Kitts	Bill Arcus
Party	Labour	Citizens'
Popular vote	20,821	10,821
Percentage	61.18	31.79
Mayor before election
Frank Kitts
Labour
Elected mayor
Frank Kitts
Labour

The 1962 Wellington mayoral election was part of the New Zealand local elections held that same year. In 1962, elections were held for the Mayor of Wellington plus other local government positions including fifteen city councillors. The polling was conducted using the standard first-past-the-post electoral method.

== Background ==
Incumbent mayor Frank Kitts was re-elected decisively for a third term over deputy mayor Bill Arcus, substantially increasing his majority. Initially Sam Barnett, the former Secretary of Justice and Controller-General of Police, was to be the Citizens' Association nomination for the mayoralty but he withdrew his nomination at the last minute. Bill Young, an executive member of the Wellington Central electorate committee of the National Party was also approached to stand for mayor, but after giving consideration to doing so, he declined to stand.

The election was also notable due to the success of Ralph Love, who became the first Maori candidate to be elected as a city councillor in Wellington's history. John Jeffries was also the youngest-ever candidate elected as a councillor (at that time) at age 33.

== Mayoralty results ==
1962 Wellington mayoral election
Party	Candidate	Votes	%	±%
Labour	Frank Kitts	20,821	61.18	+10.21
Citizens'	Bill Arcus	10,821	31.79	
United Action	Saul Goldsmith	2,531	7.43	
Informal votes		223	0.65	+0.09
Majority		9,635	28.31	+25.82
Turnout		34,031	46.4	–1.9

== Councillor results ==
1962 Wellington City Council election
Party	Candidate	Votes	%	±%
Labour	Frank Kitts (Note: As Kitts won the Mayoralty his election to the council was voided and his seat was awarded to the highest polling unsuccessful candidate.)	18,714	54.99	+4.11
Citizens'	Maida Clark	17,772	52.22	+4.43
Labour	John Churchill	15,925	46.79	+3.39
Citizens'	Bob Archibald	15,798	46.22	+8.54
Citizens'	Alice Campbell	14,978	44.01	–2.41
Citizens'	Stewart Duff	14,934	43.88	+2.76
Citizens'	Denis McGrath	14,915	43.82	
Citizens'	Noel Manthel	14,172	41.64	+0.52
Citizens'	Matt Benney	13,624	40.03	
Citizens'	John Turk	13,536	39.77	+10.25
Labour	Ralph Love	13,135	38.59	
Labour	John Jeffries	13,036	38.30	
Citizens'	George Porter	12,979	38.13	–6.68
Citizens'	Gordon Morrison	12,815	37.65	–4.35
Citizens'	Alan Simm	12,658	37.19	
Labour	Lettie Allen	12,646	37.16	–0.30
Citizens'	Douglas Barry-Martin	12,252	36.00	
Citizens'	Cecil Read	12,212	35.88	–4.96
Citizens'	John Tipping	12,105	35.57	
Labour	Jack Arthurs	11,911	35.00	–0.07
Citizens'	Arthur Jennings	11,699	34.37	
Labour	Gerald O'Brien	11,394	33.48	+3.10
Labour	Walter Pellew	11,172	32.82	
Labour	George Matthew	11,078	32.55	+1.80
Labour	Nigel Taylor	10,909	32.05	–1.34
Labour	Percival Hansen	10,266	30.16	
Labour	Allan Goldsmith	10,106	29.69	+2.83
Labour	Roland Howell	9,419	27.67	
Labour	James Herlihy	9,180	26.97	
Independent	Peter Howman	9,071	26.65	–14.30
Labour	Reginald Tillam	8,763	25.75	
United Action	Saul Goldsmith	8,489	24.94	+5.87
Independent	Berkeley Dallard	8,347	24.52	
United Action	Frank Tickner	6,407	18.82	
United Action	Leslie Austin	5,098	14.98	+0.50
United Action	Ron Brierley	4,033	11.85	+1.98
United Action	James Glass	3,658	10.74	
United Action	Francis Malcolm	3,647	10.71	
United Action	Alice Coe	3,597	10.56	+0.70
United Action	Violet Petterson	3,255	9.56	
Independent	Annette Griffin	3,131	9.20	+4.88
United Action	George Ayson	3,073	9.03	–1.59
United Action	Carlyle Edwards	3,034	8.91	
Independent	Philip Cossham	3,022	8.88	+4.49
United Action	Arthur Norris	2,701	7.93	
United Action	Alfred Ivin	2,484	7.29	
United Action	Alan McKibbin	2,454	7.21	
United Action	Patrick Fee	2,171	6.37	
Communist	Ron Smith	1,460	4.29	+0.12
Communist	Ray Nunes	978	2.87	–0.66

Table footnotes:
