= 1959 Wellington mayoral election =

New Zealand local election

← 1956	21 November 1959	1962 →
- Turnout: 36,475 (48.3%)
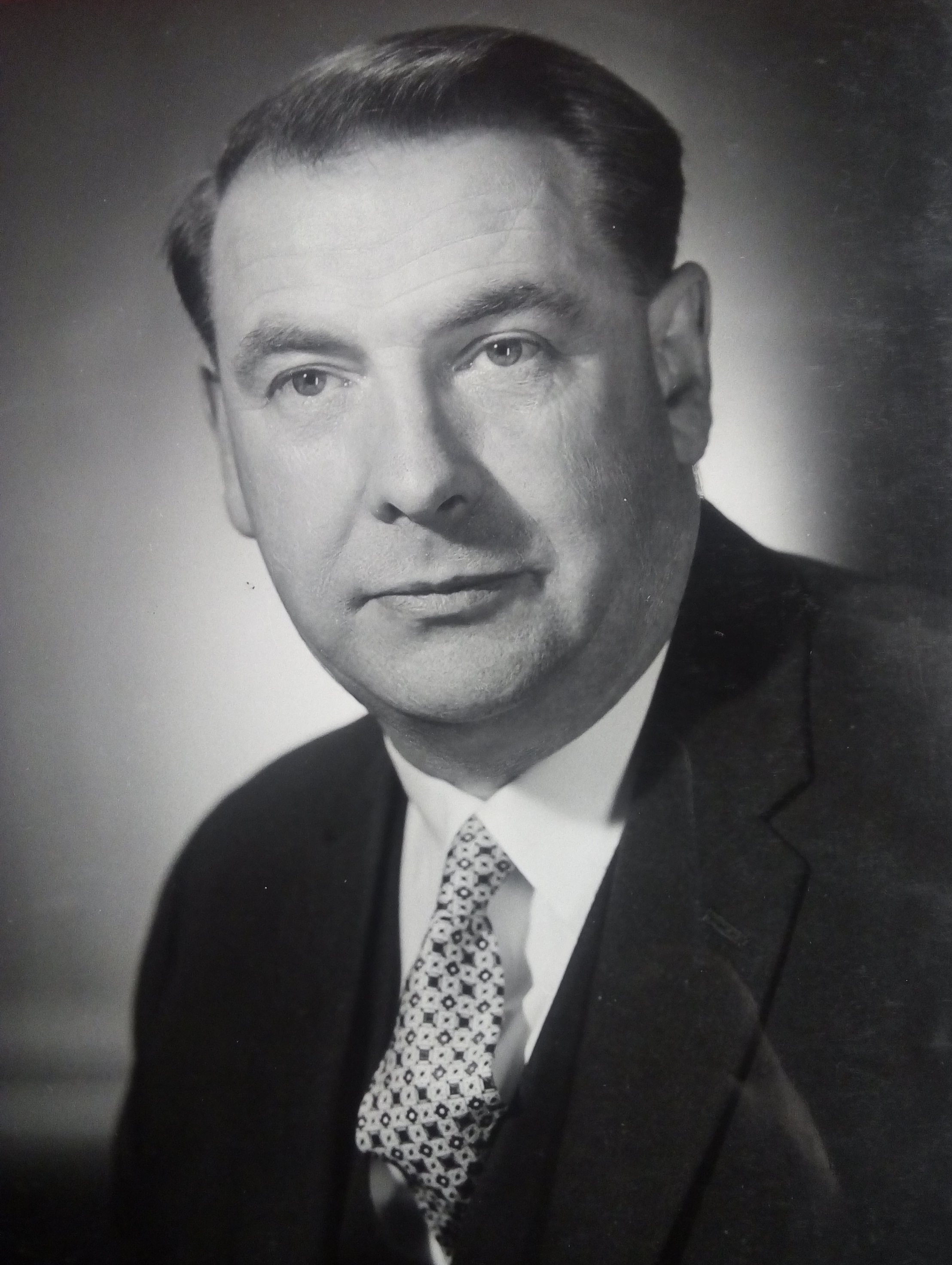

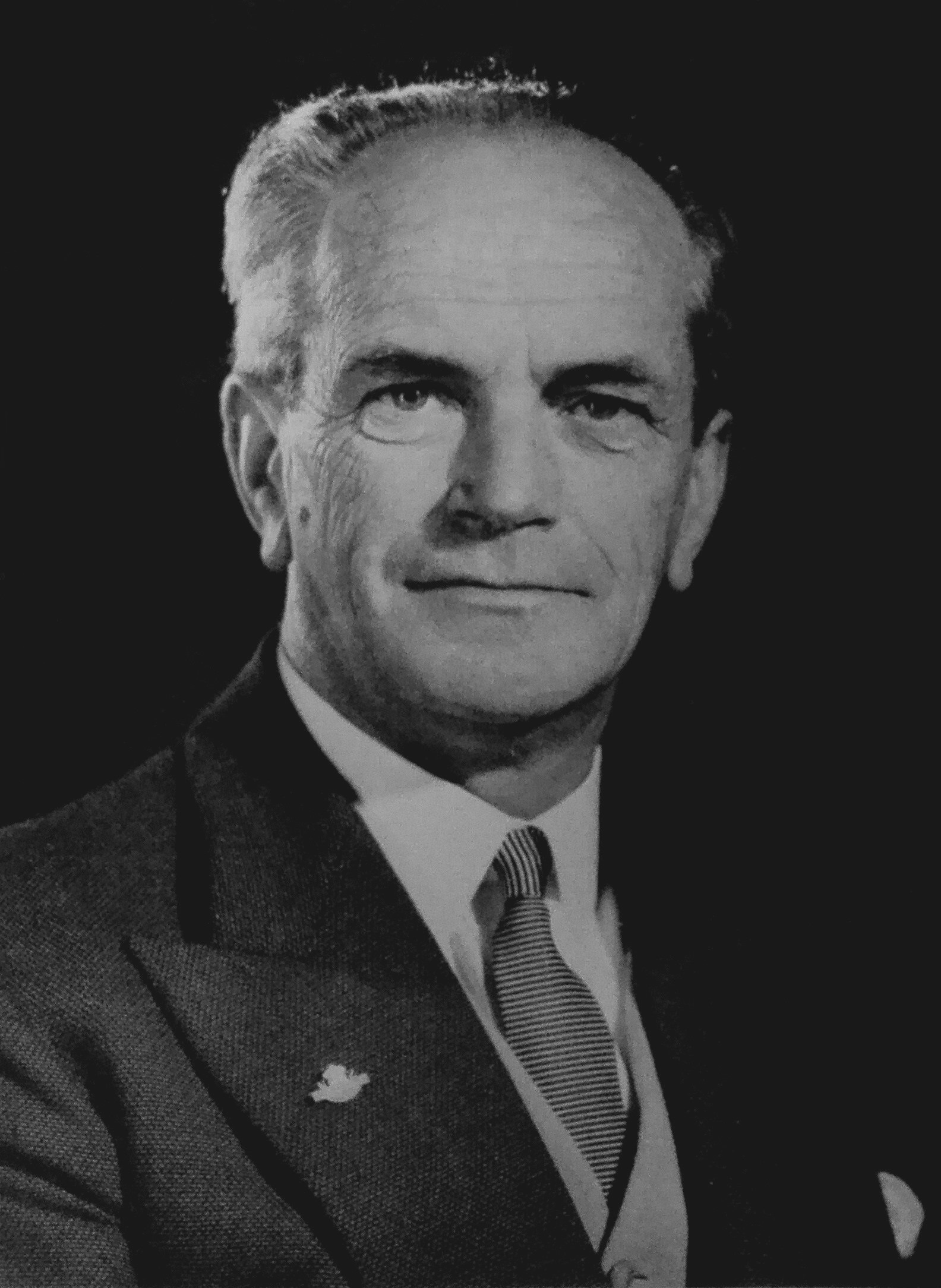
Candidate	Frank Kitts	Ernest Toop
Party	Labour	Citizens'
Popular vote	18,589	17,680
Percentage	50.97	48.47
Mayor before election
Frank Kitts
Labour
Elected mayor
Frank Kitts
Labour

The 1959 Wellington mayoral election was part of the New Zealand local elections held that same year. In 1959, elections were held for the Mayor of Wellington plus other local government positions including fifteen city councillors. The polling was conducted using the standard first-past-the-post electoral method.

== Background ==
The right-leaning Citizens' Association ticket spent the three years since the last election resolving their candidate selection controversy with the intention of re-uniting themselves and their supporters to win back the mayoralty. Four people were nominated as the mayoral candidate with envelopes containing the names were passed to a fourteen member selection committee. At the committee meeting Ernest Toop was once again chosen to contest the position. The other three names were not disclosed, but one of the speculated nominees (former mayor Thomas Hislop) confirmed his name was not among the nominations. Despite having a clean run this time he was unable to defeat Labour's popular Frank Kitts. The election also saw the debut of a new local body ticket. The Independent United Action Group stood ten council candidates under the leadership of Saul Goldsmith, though all polled poorly. It was the first time a separate ticket had been set up to challenge the long dominant Citizens' and Labour tickets.

While Kitts was re-elected, Labour's council ticket fared worse with its representation being halved from six seats to three. The overall anti-Labour vote (which was consistent nationwide) was attributed to the unpopularity of the then Labour government. Prime Minister Walter Nash commented simply "We seem to have held the mayoralties" in reference that in Wellington (as well as in Christchurch and Lower Hutt) Labour mayors were re-elected despite voters electing majority centre-right councils. In increasing his majority over twelve percent against the national trend newspapers lauded Kitts' win as a 'personal triumph'.

== Mayoralty results ==
1959 Wellington mayoral election
Party	Candidate	Votes	%	±%
Labour	Frank Kitts	18,589	50.97	+12.47
Citizens'	Ernest Toop	17,680	48.47	+17.19
Informal votes		206	0.56	
Majority		909	2.49	–4.73
Turnout		36,475	48.3	+4.6

== Councillor results ==
1959 Wellington City Council election
Party	Candidate	Votes	%	±%
Citizens'	Bill Arcus	18,908	51.83	+2.45
Labour	Frank Kitts (Note: As Kitts won the Mayoralty his election to the council was voided and his seat was awarded to the highest polling unsuccessful candidate.)	18,560	50.88	–2.51
Citizens'	Harry Nankervis	18,420	50.50	+6.06
Citizens'	Noel Manthel	17,828	48.87	
Citizens'	Maida Clark	17,434	47.79	
Citizens'	Berkeley Dallard	16,816	46.10	+1.23
Citizens'	George Porter	16,345	44.81	
Labour	Jim Bateman	15,906	43.60	–3.30
Labour	John Churchill	15,832	43.40	–3.80
Citizens'	Gordon Morrison	15,320	42.00	
Citizens'	Alice Campbell	15,174	41.60	
Citizens'	Ralph Brookes	15,135	41.49	
Citizens'	Stewart Duff	14,999	41.12	
Citizens'	Peter Howman	14,938	40.95	
Citizens'	Cecil Read	14,899	40.84	
Labour	Mervyn Castle	14,854	40.72	–4.98
Citizens'	John Turk	14,248	39.06	
Citizens'	Gibson Scott	14,096	38.64	
Citizens'	Barry Barton-Ginger	14,091	38.63	–8.94
Labour	James Roberts	13,774	37.76	–8.35
Labour	Lettie Allen	13,664	37.46	–4.68
Labour	Jack Arthurs	12,792	35.07	–4.68
Labour	Nigel Taylor	12,181	33.39	–4.67
Labour	Keith Spry	11,947	32.75	
Labour	George Matthew	11,582	31.75	
Independent	Bob Archibald	11,364	31.15	–16.04
Labour	Gerald O'Brien	11,082	30.38	
Labour	William Rose	10,927	29.95	
Labour	Edward Hodgkinson	10,508	28.80	–6.08
Labour	Charles Troghton	9,864	27.04	
Labour	Allan Goldsmith	9,798	26.86	–8.44
Independent	George Cox	9,644	26.44	
United Action	Saul Goldsmith	6,959	19.07	
United Action	Leslie Austin	5,285	14.48	–4.40
United Action	William Barker	4,230	11.59	
Independent	Annette Griffin	4,224	11.58	
United Action	Stuart Caldow	4,164	11.41	
United Action	George Ayson	3,877	10.62	
United Action	James Burgess	3,646	9.99	
United Action	Ron Brierley	3,602	9.87	
United Action	Alice Coe	3,598	9.86	
United Action	Patrick O'Rourke	3,439	9.42	
United Action	Owen Lund	3,393	9.30	
Independent	Philip Cossham	1,604	4.39	
Communist	Ron Smith	1,522	4.17	
Communist	Ray Nunes	1,289	3.53	

Table footnotes:
