= Ron Brierley =

New Zealand businessman

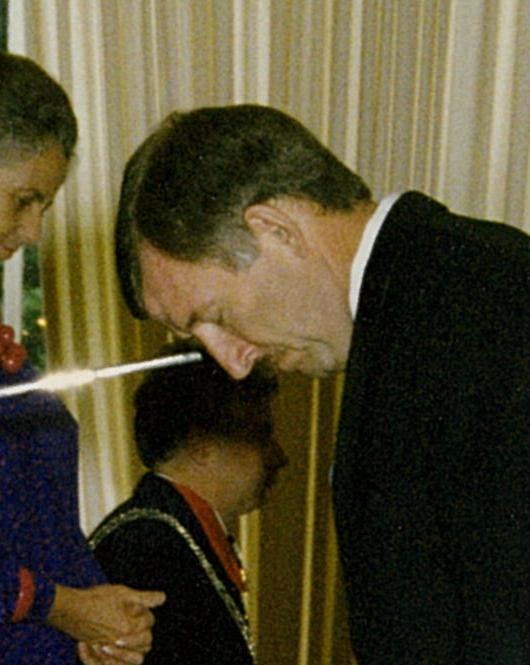
- Born: Ronald Alfred Brierley; 2 August 1937 (age 89); Wellington, New Zealand
- Occupations: Chairman and director of several companies
- Known for: Investing; Corporate raiding Possessing child sexual abuse material

Ronald Alfred Brierley (born 2 August 1937) is a New Zealand investor and corporate raider, chairman and director of a number of companies in Australia, New Zealand and the UK.

He founded R.A. Brierley Investments Ltd (BIL; renamed GuocoLeisure from October 2007) in March 1961 with no capital. By 1984 BIL was the largest company in New Zealand by market capitalization, and in 1987 had 160,000 shareholders, with a stake in over 300 companies, including Paris department store Galleries Lafayette and Air New Zealand.

In April 2021, Brierley pleaded guilty to three counts of possessing child abuse material and resigned his 1988 knighthood after the government had initiated the process of having it removed.

== Personal life ==
Brierley was born in Wellington in 1937 to middle-class parents. He went to primary school at Island Bay School, and Wellington College.

At Wellington College, he joined the New Stamp Dealers Federation, and began his first business venture selling stamps to students and staff. He was still one of the largest buyers and sellers of stamps in the world in 2014, recognised by the name "Lionheart".

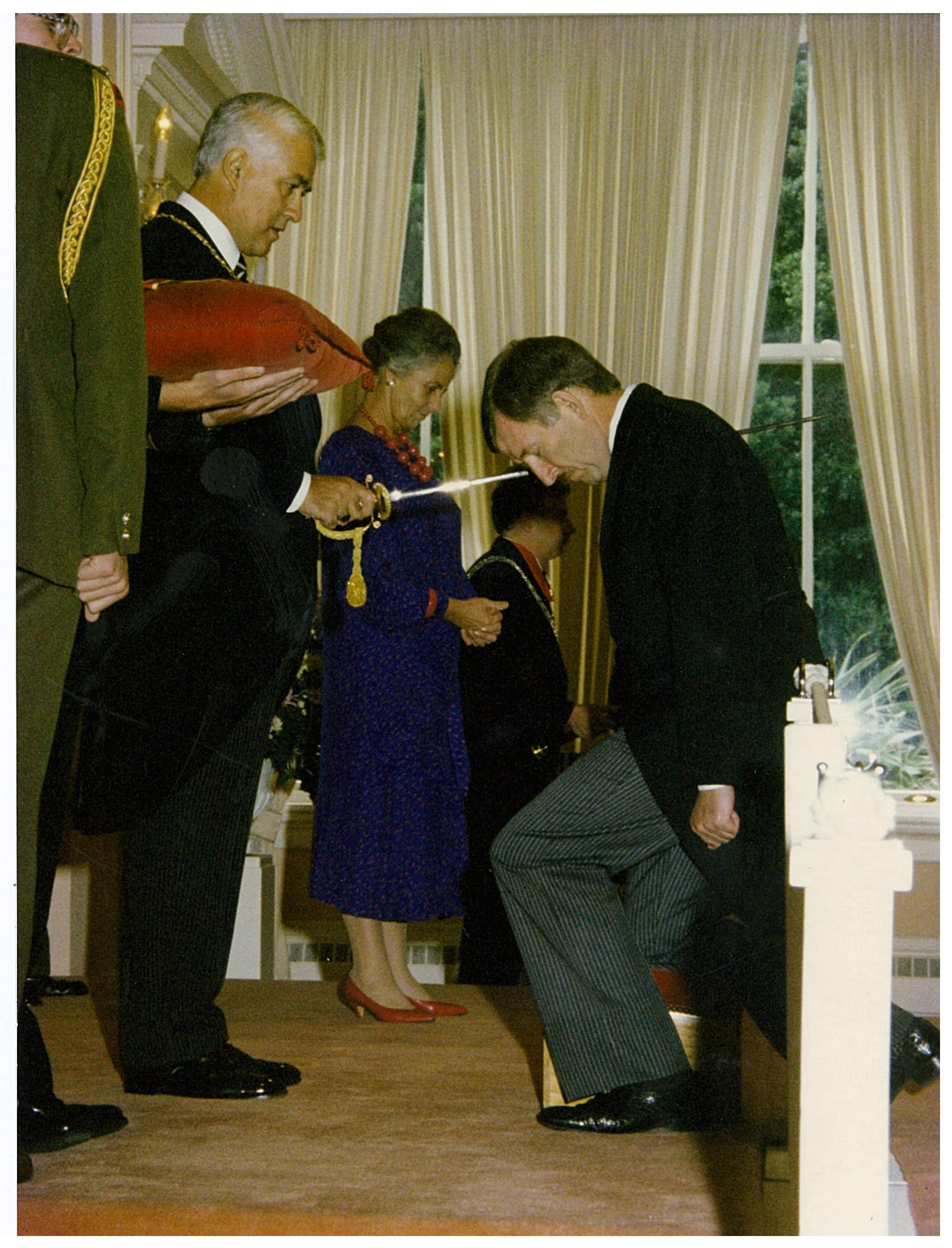
Brierley's investiture as a Knight Bachelor by Governor-General Sir Paul Reeves in 1988 – he resigned his knighthood in 2021

Brierley is a cricket enthusiast. He was a trustee of the Sydney Cricket and Sports Ground Trust from 1988 to 1996, and President of New Zealand Cricket in 1995. He also likes travelling by train. He was appointed a Knight Bachelor in the 1988 New Year Honours, for services to business management and the community.

In December 2019 Brierley was arrested in Sydney on charges of possessing over 11,000 images of child sexual abuse. He pleaded guilty to possessing abuse images in 2021, and the process of his being stripped of his knighthood was begun by Prime Minister Jacinda Ardern. On 4 May 2021, Brierley informed the prime minister that he had resigned his knighthood. In 2025 Brierley faced three more charges of possessing child abuse material in Sydney.

== Business career ==
=== Early career ===
Brierley began his career as the publisher of a horse racing tip sheet. He followed this with an investment analysis newsletter "Stocks and Shares" which he founded in 1956 at age 19. This sought to identify undervalued special situations and suggest what could be done with the companies.

His first bid via R.A. Brierley Investments Ltd was for the Otago Farmers Co-Operative Association in July 1961, which had become attractive as a target due to its cheapness, its unusual legal structure and the company being moved to an unofficial NZX bourse due to failing to comply with exchange listing requirements. While Brierley's offer was rejected, the company was forced into a change in policy and the market price of the company leapt upwards.

Other targets of Brierley's activist investment style in the 1960s and 1970s included the Southern Cross Building Society, the Finance Corporation of New Zealand, Citizens and Graziers and the Southern Farmers Co-operative Ltd in Australia. He launched an unsuccessful US$1 billion hostile takeover of American building materials manufacturer CalMat Company in 1988. Brierley's view was that his holding company, Brierley Investments Ltd, was "a monitoring organisation that continually evaluated the performance of various companies and acted as a catalyst to promote the most effective ownership of a company."

=== Post BIL ===
On 29 March 1990, Brierley was appointed chairman of investment holding company Guinness Peat Group (GPG). As chairman Brierley publicly attacked and defeated the plan to merge the London Stock Exchange with Deutsche Börse in 2001.

In December 2015, Brierley, through his new company, Mercantile Investments, launched a hostile takeover of Australian shipping company Richfield International.

== Political activities ==
Brierley was involved in local politics in Wellington in the 1950s and 1960s. He was a member of the Independent United Action Group which, under the leadership of Saul Goldsmith, campaigned to preserve the city's tramway system and halt drinking water fluoridation. At the 1959, 1962 and 1965 local elections, Brierley stood as a candidate for the Wellington City Council on the United Action ticket. He was unsuccessful (alongside all other United Action candidates) in all three attempts.

== Child abuse material conviction ==
In December 2019, Brierley was stopped and detained at Sydney International Airport following an anonymous tip-off, and he was arrested after a search of his carry-on luggage had police officers discover a large quantity of child abuse material- more than 11,000 images and a number of videos featuring girls as young as four years old. Subsequent searches of his home located 35,030 more child sex abuse images.

On 1 April 2021, Brierley pleaded guilty to three counts of possessing child abuse material. The same day, the Prime Minister of New Zealand, Jacinda Ardern, announced that she had started moves to strip Brierley of his knighthood. Brierley chose to forfeit his knighthood, and it was announced on 14 May 2021 that Queen Elizabeth II had accepted his resignation and directed that the knighthood be annulled.

On 14 October 2021, Brierley was sentenced to 14 months jail with a 7-month non-parole period. However, the New South Wales Court of Criminal Appeal allowed Brierley's legal team to challenge the term on 1 February 2022, on the basis of a claim that he had a "fear" of falling in the showers. The court was told that Brierley's health was deteriorating, and he was re-sentenced to 10 months jail with a 4-month non-parole period. Brierley was subsequently released from jail on 13 February 2022.

Brierley has Australian citizenship, so is unlikely to be deported to New Zealand after serving his sentence. If he was not, however, recent proposed changes by the then Morrison government to reduce the visa cancellation criterion to 12 months imprisonment (from 24 months) could still have seen him forcibly removed from Australia in the months ahead, and deported to New Zealand.

Brierley was given a sentence of fourteen months with a minimum of seven months of incarceration. He had an operation to remove cancerous skin lesions shortly before commitment to the penitentiary. Due to inadequate medical facilities his incarceration time was reduced to four months and he began parole early.

In March 2025 he faced three new charges of possessing child abuse material. He was arrested and appeared in the Waverley Local Court in Sydney on the same day, where he was bailed to his home address.
