= Stewart Duff =

Stewart Duff QSO JP
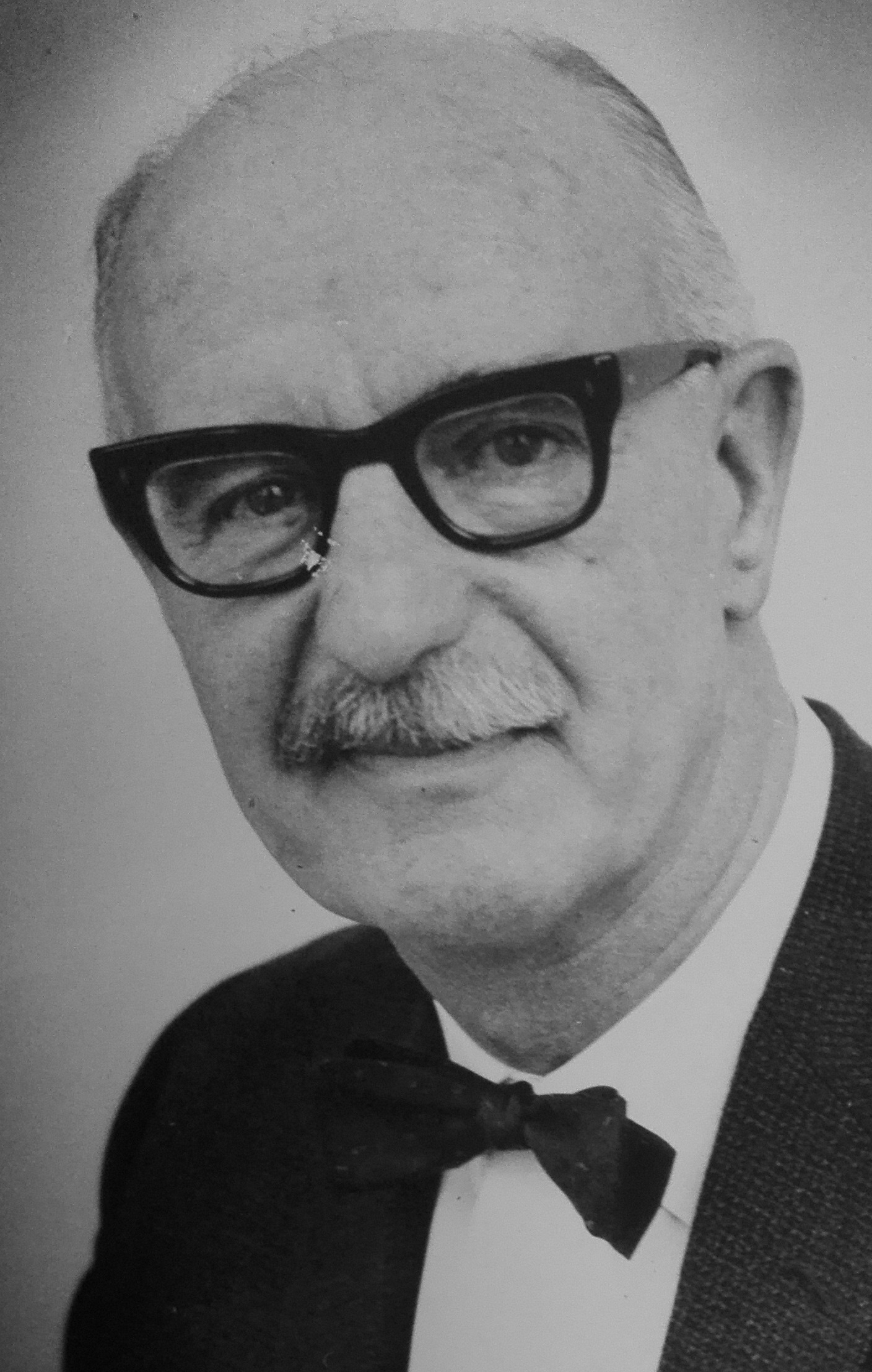

Member of the Wellington City Council
- In office 21 November 1959 – 11 October 1980
- Constituency: At-large

Member of the Wellington Harbour Board
- In office 12 October 1968 – 29 July 1981
- Succeeded by: Alister Macalister
- Constituency: Wellington City

Member of the Wellington Regional Council
- In office 11 October 1980 – 29 July 1981
- Constituency: Wellington City

Personal details
- Born: Stewart Hector James Duff; 2 November 1908 Wellington, New Zealand
- Died: 29 July 1981 (aged 72) Wellington, New Zealand
- Party: National
- Spouse: Isobel Roberta Williams (m. 1933)

Stewart Hector James Duff QSO JP (2 November 1908 – 29 July 1981) was a New Zealand businessman, civic advocate and politician. Rarely seen in public without his trademark bow tie, his dedication to improving Wellington's airport was second to none.

== Biography ==
=== Early life and career ===
Duff was born in Wellington on 2 November 1908. He was educated at Wellington College. After leaving school in 1925 he moved to Eketāhuna and worked on a local dairy farm for one year. He then began a career in the advertising industry which would last 43 consecutive years, first as a salesman then as copy writer. In 1933 he married Isobel Roberta Williams. By virtue of his advertising career, he was a member of the Wellington Publicity Club. He then joined the New Zealand Broadcasting Service as advertising manager and was later station director. He then became the managing director of the Dormer Beck advertising company. In 1964 he was appointed a Justice of the peace.

His career was briefly interrupted during World War II he spent two years overseas serving with the Royal New Zealand Air Force (RNZAF) from 1943 to 1945.

Even after he "retired" in 1969, he still worked over 40 hours a week for the many private and community causes he was affiliated with. From 1976 to 1979 he was President of the New Zealand Electrical Supply Authority. He was also President of the Electrical Development Association, Chairman of the Airport Authorities of New Zealand, deputy chairman of the Wellington Regional Water Board and a board member of the Wellington District Licensing Committee and an executive member of the New Zealand Traffic Institute. He was Chairman of Directors of the Wellington Coca-Cola Bottlers Limited and patron of both the Wellington Surfcasting Club and Wellington Angling Club.

=== Political career ===
In 1959 Duff was elected to the Wellington City Council on a Citizens' Association ticket and held a seat continuously until he retired from the council in 1980. At the time of his retirement in 1980 he was Wellington's longest ever serving city councillor, 21 years over seven terms. Wellington Mayor Sir Michael Fowler later described Duff as an "extremely good" councillor. Duff was considered for the position of deputy mayor following the 1974 election, for which the media speculated him as the frontrunner due to his seniority. However second term councillor Ian Lawrence was instead chosen. Duff was acting Mayor for one month in 1977 while both Fowler and his deputy Lawrence were overseas, the first time in decades that both the mayor and deputy were overseas at the same time.

Duff was a member of the National Party. Following the announcement of the retirement of Wellington Central MP Dan Riddiford Duff was approached to stand in the seat as the National Party candidate to succeed Riddiford. Ultimately he did not end up standing. He often took a non-partisan line and went against his Citizens' colleagues more than once notably on the city-wide electricity price hike and the conversion of both Cuba Street and Manners Street into pedestrian malls. Duff was most famous for his perpetual advocacy for Wellington International Airport which he thought was the city's most important asset and was for many years the Chairman of the Wellington Airport Authority. In 1978 he waged a successful public campaign to stop Air New Zealand being renamed 'New Zealand Airlines'.

Duff was also a member of the Wellington Harbour Board. He was first elected in 1968 and was elected for four further terms, remaining a member until his death. He supported the establishment of the Wellington Regional Council and later became a foundation member of the Regional Council, elected at the inaugural election in 1980, "topping the poll" with more votes than any other candidate.

=== Death and legacy ===
Stewart Duff Drive, an access road which passes through the airport linking Strathmore with Moa Point, was named after him in 1977 in recognition of his advocacy for the airport. Also in 1977, Duff was awarded the Queen Elizabeth II Silver Jubilee Medal, and in the 1981 New Year Honours he was appointed a Companion of the Queen's Service Order for public services.

Despite declining health he continued his public service, though he decided to stand down from the city council after suffering a heart attack in 1979, though was still on the Harbour Board and regional council (which met less regularly). Duff died at his home in Oriental Bay, Wellington on 29 July 1981 aged 72. He was survived by his wife Roberta and daughter Diana.
