= Gordon Morrison (engineer) =

New Zealand engineer and politician

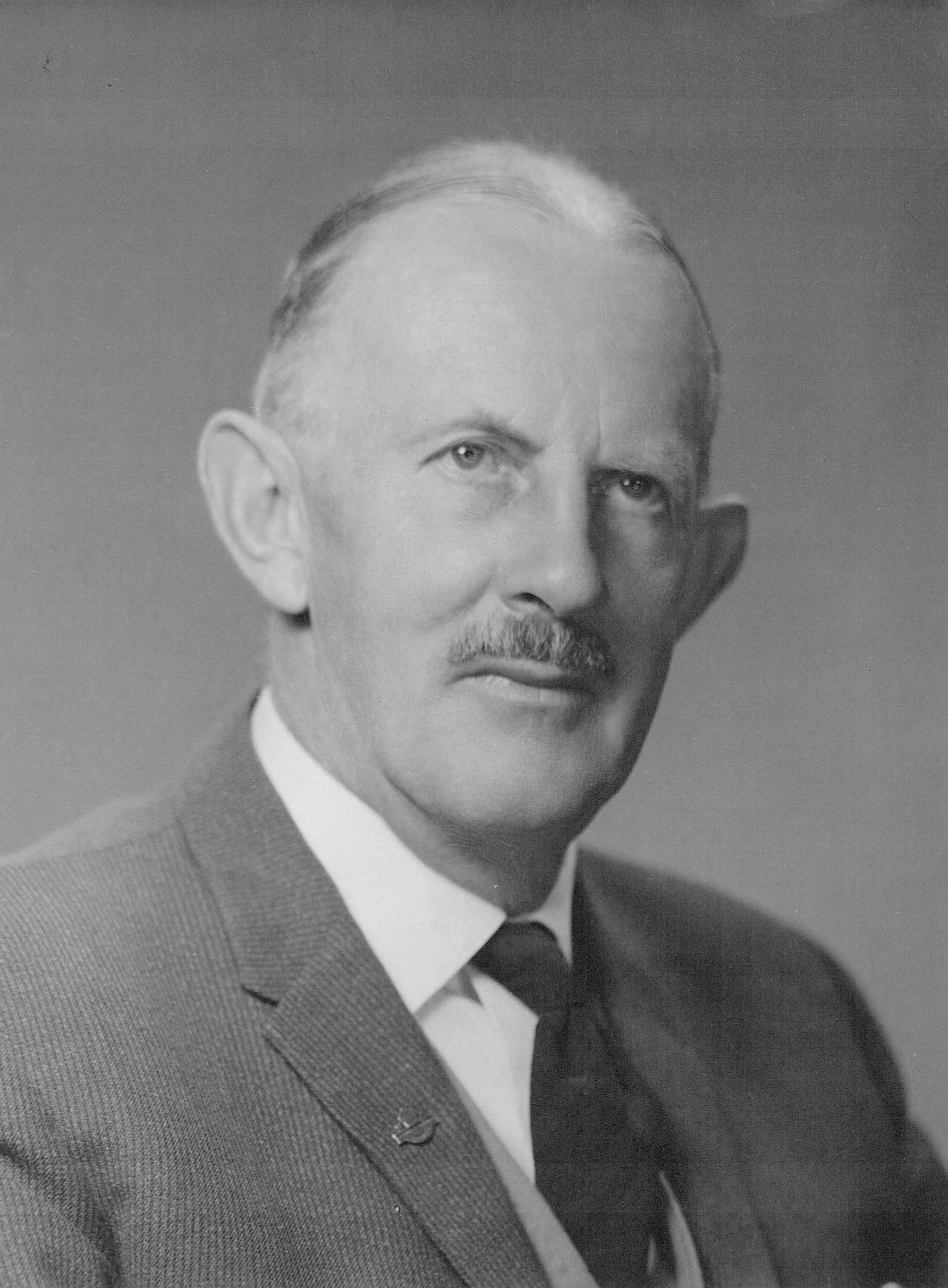
Gordon Morrison in 1959

Walter Gordon Morrison OBE (12 March 1903 – 28 October 1983) was a New Zealand consulting engineer and local-body politician.

== Biography ==
=== Early life ===
Morrison was born in Waimate in 1903.

During World War II Morrison was captain and commanding officer of the Fifth Field war Park Company of New Zealand Engineers in Crete during 1941. There he saved a company of New Zealand soldiers from capture at Souda Bay. By the end of the war he had reached the rank of Lieutenant Colonel and worked on many civil engineering projects in the Middle East. He was appointed a Member of the Order of the British Empire (Military Division) in the 1952 Queen's Birthday Honours for his services on the New Zealand Territorial Force. The following year, he was awarded the Queen Elizabeth II Coronation Medal.

Morrison married Aileen Machonachie in Shermansbury, Sussex, on 13 November 1965. Machonachie was assistant director of the overseas students department of the British Council.

=== Professional career ===
He formed several firms including W. G. Morrison and Partners in 1959 and subsequently Morrison and Cooper and Partners, Consulting Engineers and Registered Architects, in 1971. He built the first prestressed concrete bridge in New Zealand over the Hutt River. He also designed Aurora House in Wellington for which he received a design award from the New Zealand Association of Consulting Engineers. Morrison retired from the partnership (then known as Morrison & Cooper) in 1974 but worked part-time in the office before he finally retired, moving to Waikanae in April 1980. In 1973 he was awarded the Alfred O. Glasse award by the New Zealand Planning Institute for his contribution to urban development planning in Wellington. He was later to serve as the President of the New Zealand Institution of Engineers between 1958 and 1959. For his contribution to engineering he was awarded an honorary doctorate in science from the University of Canterbury in 1973.

=== Political career ===
In 1959 Morrison won a seat on the Wellington City Council on a Citizens' Association ticket which he was to hold until 1971 when he retired. He was chairman of the Town Planning Committee of the city council for over a decade, where he finalised Wellington's district scheme. He also spent three years as chairman of the Housing Committee. Wellington Mayor Sir Michael Fowler later described Morrison as an "extremely good" councillor.

Morrison attempted a political comeback in 1974. He stood as an independent, but was unsuccessful.

=== Later life and death ===
Morrison died of lung cancer at the Mary Potter Hospice on 28 October 1983, aged 80, survived by his wife Aileen.
