= Maida Clark =

New Zealand educator (1902–1991)

Maida Clark QSO JP
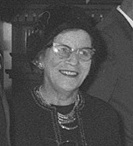

5th Principal of Wellington Girls' College
- In office 1950–1958
- Preceded by: Esther North
- Succeeded by: Betty Fraser

Wellington City Councillor
- In office 1959–1968

Personal details
- Born: Maida Jessie Clark; 5 November 1902 Wellington, New Zealand
- Died: 31 May 1991 (aged 88) Lower Hutt, New Zealand
- Party: National
- Other political affiliations: Wellington Citizens' Association
- Education: Victoria University College
- Profession: Schoolteacher

Maida Jessie Clark QSO JP (5 November 1902 – 31 May 1991) was a New Zealand educator, politician, and community leader. She served as principal of Wellington Girls' College between 1950 and 1958, and was a Wellington city councillor from 1959 to 1968.

== Early life and family ==
Clark was born in Wellington on 5 November 1902, the daughter of Jessie and Donald George Clark. She was educated at Wellington Girls' College, and went on to study history at Victoria University College, graduating with a Master of Arts degree with second-class honours in 1925.

== Teaching career ==
Clark became a schoolteacher, and worked at New Plymouth Girls' High School, Auckland Girls' Grammar School, and Napier Girls' High School, as well as gaining experience teaching in England. She became headmistress of Wellington Girls' College, serving in that role from 1950 to 1958.

== Political and other activities ==
At the 1959 local-body elections, Clark was elected under the banner of the Wellington Citizens' Association as a member of the Wellington City Council, polling fifth out of 46 candidates. She was re-elected at the next two elections, serving as a city councillor until 1968. She was a member of the city council's housing allocation committee, and represented the council on the state housing allocation committee.

In August 1960, Clark was selected as the National Party's candidate for the Onslow electorate at that year's general election. Standing against the Labour incumbent, Henry May, Clark gained 7880 votes, losing to May by 790 votes.

Clark was appointed to the Cinematograph Films Censorship Board of Appeal by Leon Götz, Minister of Internal Affairs, in 1962, serving until 1974. During her tenure, significant rulings in which Clark was involved include overturning the chief censor's ban on The Knack ...and How to Get It in 1966, and upholding the censor's decisions not to allow My Lover, My Son (1970), What Do You Say to a Naked Lady? (1972), and Last Tango in Paris (1973) to be screened in New Zealand. In the case of Last Tango in Paris, the review body's decision was not unanimous, but Clark agreed with the majority decision to ban the film.

From 1962 to 1963, Clark served as president of the New Zealand Library Association. Between 1962 and 1974, she was a member of the Golden Kiwi distribution committee for youth and recreation matters. She was also active in sports administration, serving as patron of the Wellington Women's Cricket Association in 1961, vice president of the New Zealand Women's Hockey Association, and patron of the Wellington Women's Hockey Association. From 1950 to 1960, Clark was president of the Wellington YWCA board of directors, and she was president of Ohariu Golf Club in 1963.

== Later life and death ==
In the 1975 Queen's Birthday Honours, Clark was appointed a Companion of the Queen's Service Order, for services to education and the community. She died in Lower Hutt on 31 May 1991, at the age of 88.
