= Saul Goldsmith =

New Zealand importer and merchant

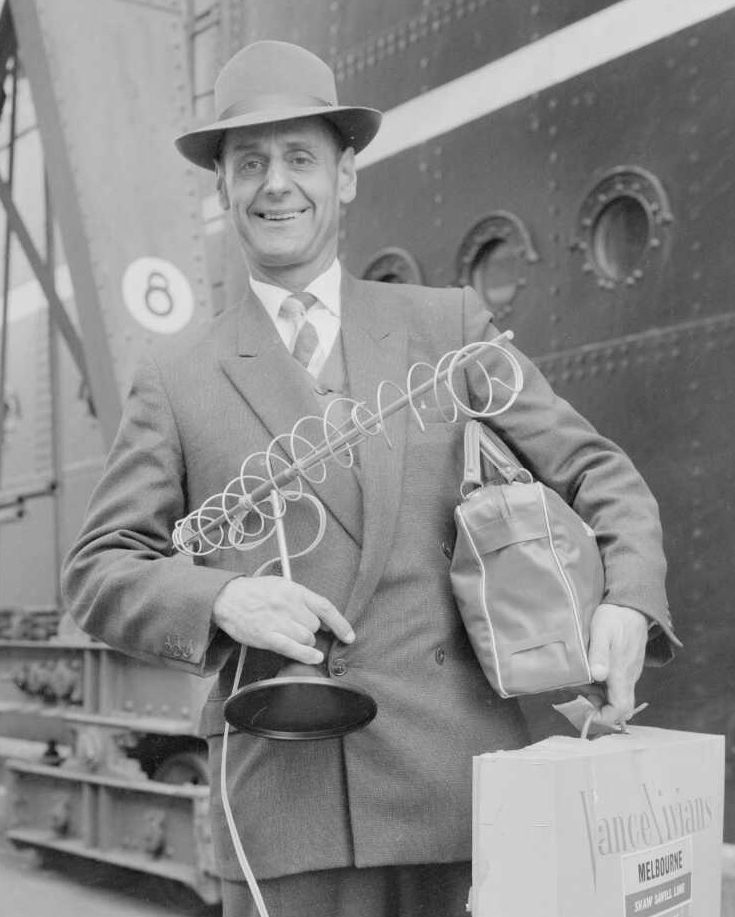
Saul Goldsmith in 1960

Abraham Saul Goldsmith MBE (17 February 1911 – 4 November 1988) was an importer and merchant from Wellington, New Zealand. He was a foundation member of the National Party and was active at a local level. Goldsmith was also a noted chess player.

== Early life ==
Goldsmith was born in 1911 in Auckland. His parents were Joseph Isaac Goldsmith and Deborah Goldsmith (née Cohen). Goldsmith received his education at Brooklyn School and at Wellington College. He was also the cousin of Auckland Mayor Dove-Myer Robinson.

In the 1920s he started work as a messenger-clerk before leaving to start his own business. In 1930, he founded the General Agencies Company and was its managing director; the company concerned itself with importing goods. By 1980 the company imported over two thousand product lines, the majority tobacconist lines.

== Political career ==
Goldsmith was for many years an executive member of the Brooklyn Municipal Electors Association. He was also a member of the Wellington Travel Club and the Brooklyn Progressive Association. He was a foundation member of the Independent United Action Group and led ten candidates—including himself—in the 1959 Wellington City Council election; none of the group were elected. In the 1962 Wellington City mayoral election, Goldsmith was one of three mayoral candidates, and came a distant last. Goldsmith stood out as a proponent of the retention of the Wellington tramway system. Later, he was the president of the Wellington Municipal Electors Association. Despite never winning office he found alternative ways to bring about change. One such occasion was when he was concerned by the under-utilisation of land in Jam Tin Gully, a former landfill. Goldsmith rang the wives of city councillors and asked that they discuss the matter with their husbands. Soon afterwards the area was designated the site of the soon to be to be constructed Wellington Show Buildings.

His status as a lively perennial candidate in Wellington made him his own brand of local celebrity. A reporter for The Dominion newspaper said in 1971 Goldsmith was a "...political novelty. He is Wellington's best known and perennial loser. In the last 14 years he has been defeated in two parliamentary, five City Council and two mayoral elections. Plus one council by-election and lost more causes than Don Quixote ever dreamed of". His notoriety was such that he was the subject of an entire chapter in a social studies textbook used in New Zealand schools in the 1970s. Published by Farland and McLeod, the chapter was titled the "Lone Campaigner", and discussed Goldsmith's campaigns on local issues and his methods of electioneering and advocacy. Quoted examples were his "save the trams" campaign and his disputes with the Ministry of Transport over the accuracy of its microwave speed detectors.

In 1936, Goldsmith was a foundation member of the National Party. He was involved in local political affairs in Wellington, and was active in the Karori and Island Bay electorates. He stood in the Island Bay electorate for National in the 1957 and 1966 elections. The death of Norman Kirk caused the 1974 Sydenham by-election and the National Party decided not to stand a candidate, but Goldsmith decided to stand as an independent National candidate; he came a distant fourth in the by-election. As Goldsmith had gone directly against the decision of the party's dominion executive, party president George Chapman recommended the suspension of his membership. After discussions with the Canterbury-Westland division of the party it was felt that it was no longer necessary to suspend Goldsmith and that public announcements that he was neither an official candidate nor party endorsed had made the party's stance clear to the public. Political historian Barry Gustafson described him as "a colourful character and an entertaining platform speaker". One famed instance at a National Party conference in Dunedin, Goldsmith gave a hilarious speech to the delegates which left them all in hysterics.

In the 1979 Queen's Birthday Honours, Goldsmith was appointed a Member of the Order of the British Empire, for services to the community. His mother had received the same honour in the 1947 New Year Honours, for her services in connection with patriotic and social welfare movements during and after World War II.

== Other interests ==
Goldsmith's parents were "chess enthusiasts". Goldsmith himself also played chess and joined the committee of the Wellington Chess League at age 23; his father was the inaugural president of the club. Goldsmith contested chess championships in both New Zealand and Australia. He played at the New Zealand championships in 1936 Auckland, and in 1939 in Wellington. When Goldsmith's brother Lionel was killed in Europe during World War II, his parents donated the Goldsmith Chess Trophy in his memory.

From 1948 to 1950, Goldsmith travelled through the United States and Canada and lectured on New Zealand. He was a board member of the Wellington Tramway Museum, and was the organisation's president from 1969 to 1974. In 1974, he was president of the Kelburn Cable Car Preservation Society.

Goldsmith died in 1988. On 7 November, he was buried in the Jewish section of Karori Cemetery next to his mother.
