= Lettie Allen =

Public servant, political activist, feminist, local politician (1901–1980)

- Born: Lettie Annie Skinner; 3 October 1901; Wellington, New Zealand
- Died: 15 June 1980 (aged 78); Tangimoana, New Zealand
- Education: Wellington Girls' College
- Spouses: Sidney Berkeley Allen (m. 1924; died 1956) Phillip Ray Chandler (m. 1966; died 1976)
- Children: 7
- Parents: Edward Pond Skinner (father); Sarey Stuart (mother)

Lettie Annie Allen (née Skinner) (3 October 1901 – 15 June 1980) was a New Zealand public servant, political activist, feminist and local politician. She was born in Wellington, New Zealand on 3 October 1901.

== Early life ==
Allen was born to married couple Sarey Stuart and Edward Pond Skinner. Her father worked as a post office linesman. She had three older siblings, and grew up in Berhampore. Allen attended South Wellington School, and later Wellington Girls' College with the assistance of scholarships. In 1918, Allen represented Wellington at the national women's field hockey championships, later going on to become the vice president of the Wellington Women's Hockey Association.

After graduating from secondary school, Allen worked as a public service clerical employee for six years. She married Sidney Berkeley Allen on 31 May 1924 in Wellington. Her husband worked as a storeman and a driver. The couple would have seven children.

== Career ==
Allen first became active in the Labour Party in 1924, and was elected secretary of its Ngaio branch in 1936. She became a delegate to the Wellington Labour Representation Committee, and held this position for another thirty years. Allen was particularly vocal in support of state housing, women's political representation, government-funded childcare and occupational opportunities for women.

In the late 1930s, Labour consulted Allen about the design of the state house kitchen. She successfully added several modifications to the design.

In 1943, Allen rejoined the New Zealand Public Service Association as a clerical officer. In 1949, she helped lead the revival of the PSA's Wellington Women's Committee, served as its secretary organiser for three years, and represented it to the National Council of Women of New Zealand. In 1955 Allen was elected chair of a new women's committee as part of the PSA's equal pay campaign.

Allen was also active in the New Zealand Federation of Business and Professional Women's Clubs, and the Wellington Housewives' Union. She was the second woman to serve on a New Zealand jury and helped form Birthright New Zealand.

Allen was important in revitalising the Wellington section of the New Zealand Howard League for Penal Reform in 1955, and became a committee member and vice president of the Prisoner's Aid and Rehabilitation Society. In 1956 she co-founded the National Committee for the Abolition of Capital Punishment.

Additionally, Allen was a member of the Wellington Hospital Board from 1950 to 1965, advocating for patient rights, staff working conditions and better geriatric care. She also served for Labour on the Wellington city council from 1956 to 1959, and again from 1962 to 1965.

Allen was a justice of the peace since 1949 and was a long-time secretary of the Ngaio School Committee and the Wellington School Committees Association. She helped establish the Intellectually Handicapped Children's Parents' Association in 1949 and was active in the local WEA and League of Mothers. She was involved with the Society for Closer Relations with Russia during the 1940s and protested against Holland government's 1951 emergency regulations.

Allen was an atheist, a humanist and an egalitarian. She was a long-term member of the Campaign for Nuclear Disarmament, the New Zealand Left Book Club and the Rationalist Association. She rejected an OBE nomination in the late 1950s.

== Later life ==
Allen's first husband died in 1956. In 1965, she retired to Tangimoana, Manawatu. In Feilding on 3 October 1966, she married Phillip Ray Chandler, a retired farmer. Chandler died in 1976. Allen suffered a number of strokes in her final years, yet still founded the Tangimoana branch of the Labour Party in 1978. In 1979 she received a long-service award and life membership in the Labour Party. She died in her Tangimoana home on 15 June 1980.
