= List of cases of the High Court of New Zealand =

This is a list of the notable cited cases of the High Court of New Zealand.

== A ==
- Attorney-General v Rutherford [[1976] 1 NZLR 403]
- Awa v Independent News Auckland Ltd [[1997] 3 NZLR 590]

== B ==
- Bayley v Public Trustee [[1907] NZGazLawRp 230; (1907) 27 NZLR 659; (1907) 10 GLR 204]
- Boyd Knight v Purdue [[1999] 2 NZLR 278]

== C ==
- Carrigan v Redwood [[1910] NZGazLawRp 193; (1910) 30 NZLR 244; (1910) 13 GLR 183]

== D ==
- Daniels v Thompson [[1998] NZCA 3]; [[1998] 3 NZLR 22]
- Dehn v Attorney-General CA180/88 [[1989] NZCA 57]; [[1989] 1 NZLR 320]
- Dunlea v Attorney-General [[2000] NZCA 84]; [[2000] 3 NZLR 136]; (2000) 18 CRNZ 1; (2000) 5 HRNZ 707
- Dunrae Manufacturing Ltd v CL North & Co Ltd [[1988] 2 NZLR 602]

== F ==
- French v Auckland City Council [[1974] 1 NZLR 340]

== G ==
- Gregory v Rangitikei [1995] 2 NZLR 208, (1994) 6 TCLR 199
- Gulf Corporation Ltd v Gulf Harbour Investments Ltd [2005] NZCA 121 (25 May 2005); [2006] 1 NZLR 21; (2005) 6 NZCPR 412

== H ==
- Hawke's Bay Motor Co Ltd v Russell [[1972] NZLR 542]
- Herbison v Papakura Video Ltd [[1987] 2 NZLR 527]
- Howden v Ministry of Transport CA195/87 [[1987] NZCA 113]; [[1987] 2 NZLR 747]; (1987) 2 CRNZ 417
- Hughes v Huppert [[1991] 1 NZLR 474]

== J ==
- Jolly v Palmer [[1991] 3 NZBLC 102,000]

== L ==
- Ladstone Holdings Ltd v Leonora Holdings Ltd [[2006] 1 NZLR 211]
- Landzeal Group Ltd v Kyne [[1990] 3 NZLR 574]

== M ==
- March Construction Ltd v Christchurch City Council [[1995] 6 TCLR 394]
- Markholm Construction Co Ltd v Wellington City Council [[1985] 2 NZLR 520]
- Matheson v Northcote College Board of Governors [[1975] 2 NZLR 106]
- McCarthy v Wellington City [[1966] NZLR 481]
- McLaren v McLaren [[1919] NZGazLawRp 83; (1919) 21 GLR 287]
- McLaren Transport Ltd v Somerville [[1996] NZLR 424]
- Money v Ven-Lu-Ree Ltd [[1988] 2 NZLR 414], aff'd [[1989] 3 NZLR 129]
- Mouat v Clark Boyce [[1992] 2 NZLR 559]

== O ==
- Oxborough v North Harbour Builders Ltd

== P ==
- Parker v Small Smith [(2005) 5 NZCPR 921]
- Pearson v Aotea District Maori Land Board [[1945] NZGazLawRp 39; [1945] NZLR 542; (1945) 47 GLR 205]
- Pendergast v Attorney-General CA83/98 [[1998] 3 NZ ConvC 192,729]

== Q ==
- Queenstown Lakes District Council v Palmer CA83/98 [[1998] NZCA 190]; [[1999] 1 NZLR 549]

== R ==
- Rayneon (New Zealand) Ltd v Fraser [[1940] 1 NZLR 825]
- R A & T J Carll Ltd v Berry [[1981] 2 NZLR 76]
- Re Amelia Bullock-Webster [[1936] NZGazLawRp 144; [1936] NZLR 814; (1936) 36 GLR 709]
- Re Budge [[1942] NZGazLawRp 43; [1942] NZLR 350; (1942) 44 GLR 282]
- Re Karsten (Deceased) [[1950] NZGazLawRp 92; [1950] NZLR 1022; (1950) 52 GLR 496]
- Rees v Sinclair [[1974] 1 NZLR 180]
- Rembrandt Custodians Ltd v Pro-Drill (Auck) Ltd [HC Auckland, M337-IM03, 13 June 2003]

== S ==
- Saunderson v Purchase [[1958] NZLR 588]
- Slater Wilmhurst Ltd v Crown Group Custodian Ltd [[1991] 1 NZLR 344]

== T ==
- Tak and Co Inc v AEL Corp Ltd [(1995) 5 NZBLC 103,887]
- Thexton v Thexton [[2001] 1 NZLR 237]
- Tucker v News Media Ownership Ltd [HC Wellington CP477/86 [1986] NZHC 216; [1986] 2 NZLR 716]

== V ==
- Van Kleef v Colonial Mutual General Insurance Co (NZ) Ltd [HC Timaru AP6/2001 [2001] NZHC 410]
- Van Soest v Residual Health Management Unit [[2001] 1 NZLR 179]
- Vickery v Waitaki International Ltd [[1992] 2 NZLR 58]

== W ==
- Walmsley v Christchurch City Council [[1990] 1 NZLR 199]
- Wellington City Council v Dominion Budget Rent a Car Ltd (in liq) [HC Wellington CP105/87 [1988] NZHC 145]
- Williams v Attorney-General [[1990] 1 NZLR 646]
- Wilson v New Brighton Panelbeaters Ltd [[1989] 1 NZLR 74]
