= Oxborough (disambiguation) =

Oxborough is a village in Norfolk, England.

Oxborough may also refer to:

== People with the surname ==
- Thomas Oxborough (died 1623), English lawyer and politician

== Other uses ==
- Operation Oxborough, name for the investigation into the murder of Jill Dando
- Oxborough Dirk, ceremonial weapon
- Oxborough v North Harbour Builders Ltd, New Zealand court case

== See also ==
- Oxburgh Hall
- Henry Oxburgh, Irish Jacobite executed in 1716
