= Haines House =

Haines House may refer to:

== Places and structures ==
=== United States ===
(by state, then city)

- Alfred Haines House, San Diego, California, listed on the National Register of Historic Places (NRHP) in San Diego County, California
- Elizabeth Haines House, Sebring, Florida, NRHP-listed
- John Haines House, Boise, Idaho, NRHP-listed
- Haines House Museum, Waukegan, Illinois, a museum in Illinois
- Benjamin Haines House, Montgomery, New York, NRHP-listed, also called Haines Farmstead
- Jonathan Haines House, Medford, New Jersey, NRHP-listed underground railroad' station
- Frank Haines House, Sabina, Ohio, listed on the NRHP in Clinton County, Ohio
- Hanson Haines House, Philadelphia, Pennsylvania, NRHP-listed
- Wyck House, also called Haines House, Philadelphia, Pennsylvania, NRHP-listed

== See also ==
- Haynes House (disambiguation)
- Haines House Haulage v Gamble
