= R A & T J Carll Ltd v Berry =

- Court: High Court of New Zealand, Hamilton
- Full case name: R A & T J Carll Ltd v Anthony Berry, the Mayor, councillors and the inhabitants of the Borough of Waihi
- Decided: 5 June 1981
- Citation: [1981] 2 NZLR 76
- Transcript: High Court judgment

Court membership
- Judge sitting: Bisson J

Keywords
- negligent misstatement

R A & T J Carll Ltd v Berry [1981] 2 NZLR 76 is a cited case in New Zealand regarding liability in tort for negligent misstatements.

== Background ==
The Carll's were in the process of purchasing a coffee lounge in Waihi. As a precaution, they checked with the local health inspector Mr Berry, whom informed them that he had just visited the premises, and they had passed.

Unfortunately, the coffee lounge was found to be infested with cockroaches resulting in it being closed whilst it was being fumigated.

As a result, the Carll's sued the previous owners for breach of contract, obtaining $3,500. They also sued the health inspector and his employer, the local council, for negligence.

== Held ==
The High Court ruled that the health inspector's inspection was obviously negligent for missing the cockroach infestation, and although it was accepted that the council was not in the business about advising about cockroach infestations, it was obviously still part of the health inspector's job to deal with such inquiries. Damages of $2,500 were awarded for the loss of value of business.

Footnote: Dame Silvia Cartwright was the defence counsel.
