= Dunrae Manufacturing Ltd v CL North & Co Ltd =

- Court: Auckland High Court
- Full case name: Dunrae Manufacturing Limited v CL North & Company Limited
- Decided: 26 February 1988
- Citation: [1988] 2 NZLR 602
- Transcript: High Court judgment

Court membership
- Judge sitting: Smellie J

Keywords
- accord and satisfaction

Dunrae Manufacturing Ltd v CL North & Co Ltd [[1988] 2 NZLR 602] is a prominent case regarding accord and satisfaction and its application in New Zealand.

== Background ==
CL North did some electrical work for Dunrae Manufacturing. Unfortunately, for reasons not explained in the judgement, the final bill exceeded the original estimate for the work subsequently done, resulting in Dunrae receiving 4 invoices from CL North totalling $14,049.93.

Dunrae paid the first two invoices, and disputed the remaining balance.

A few months later, Dunrae mailed CL North a cheque for $6,158.98, with an attached (brief and unsigned) note stating "Enclosed cheque is tendered in full and final payment of our account with you, accordingly our account is now clear", for which CL North later banked.

However, the Office Manager did not make any note of the attached letter, nor brought it to the attention of the management. The management stated in these proceedings that if this note had been brought to their attention, they would not have banked the cheque.

CL North then proceeded to continue invoicing Dunrae for the balance, for which they pleaded that there was no balance owing due to accord and satisfaction, a legal issue that the creditor could simply deny as they claimed that they had not even received the letter in the first place.

CL North then sued for the remaining balance of $2,591.45, and just before trial, the Office Manager then admitted they probably received the letter as claimed. Despite this setback, the creditor pursued its legal claim on the grounds that there was no legally binding agreement, and won judgement against the debtor in the District Court.

The debtor appealed.

== Held ==
The judge overturned the District court's ruling, meaning the remaining balance was not legally owed any more. Smellie J stated:

…if the office lady banked the cheque when she should not have and failed to refer the note attached to it when she should have, the party to bear the consequences of these acts is clearly the Respondent [the creditor] and not the Appellant.

However, the judgement did not cover what would have happened if the creditor here had banked the cheque and promptly informed the debtor that it was not accepted has full satisfaction, as per Haines House Haulage Co Ltd v Gamble, or if banked by mistake, that it had immediately notified the debtor that it had been banked by mistake, and not accepted it as full satisfaction, as per Magnum v Viko.
