= Thaddeus McCarthy (judge) =

New Zealand jurist

The Right Honourable Sir Thaddeus McCarthy ONZ KBE

President of the Court of Appeal
- In office 1973–1976
- Preceded by: Alexander Turner
- Succeeded by: Clifford Richmond

Personal details
- Born: 24 August 1907
- Died: 11 April 2001 (aged 93)

Sir Thaddeus Pearcey McCarthy ONZ KBE (24 August 1907 – 11 April 2001) was a New Zealand jurist.

McCarthy was educated at St Bede's College, Christchurch, and then studied law at Victoria University College, New Zealand and graduated in 1928. He was admitted as a solicitor only in 1929, completed an LLM degree (in 1930), and in 1931 was admitted as a barrister. He practised at the Wellington bar for 26 years until his appointment to the bench. McCarthy was in active service overseas during the Second World War. He prosecuted Walter James Bolton, who was executed in 1957, the last person executed in New Zealand.

McCarthy was appointed to the Supreme Court bench in 1957, and from 1958 onwards he served periodically as a temporary judge of the Court of Appeal of New Zealand. He sat in the Rees v Sinclair case. Sir Thaddeus was President of the Court of Appeal from 1973 to 1976, and was the presiding member of an unprecedented seven Royal Commissions. He was also a Commissioner of Security Appeals.

McCarthy had a reputation as a "plain English" judge with an outstanding ability to make complex matters understandable. He was appointed a Knight Bachelor in the 1964 New Year Honours, and a Knight Commander of the Order of the British Empire on 3 May 1974. He was appointed a Member of the Order of New Zealand, New Zealand's highest civilian honour, on 6 February 1994.
