= CRPC =

CRPC or CrPC may refer to:

- Castration-resistant prostate cancer
- Code of Criminal Procedure (India), or Criminal Procedure Code (CrPC)
- Consumer Rights Commission of Pakistan
- Credit Reporting Privacy Code (New Zealand)
