= Veda (NZ) =

New Zealand credit reference agency

Veda Advantage NZ Limited
- Company type: Private Company
- Founded: 1987
- Headquarters: Auckland, New Zealand
- Key people: John Roberts
- Products: Business Services
- Website: www.veda.co.nz

Veda (NZ) Limited was a credit reference agency in New Zealand. it was acquired by Equifax in February 2016.

== Business ==
Veda supplied credit information on both individuals and companies. Its business was largely governed by the Credit Reporting Privacy Code (New Zealand), issued under the Privacy Act.

== History ==
The origins of Veda was a group of credit providers sharing credit information with its members, which was called the Credit Reference Association. This database was later taken over by Baycorp.

For many years Veda owned the largest debt collection company in New Zealand, Baycorp Collection Services, which it sold off in 2007 for $97 million.

In 2002, Baycorp in New Zealand merged with Data Advantage in Australia, with the merged company being called Baycorp Advantage.

== Financials ==
Veda changed from a public company to a private company in 2007. For the financial year ending 30 June 2007, out of a total revenue of $32,654,000, Veda made a profit of $12,336,000, and after paying a special dividend that year of $30,000,000, Veda had shareholder funds of $76,921,000.
