= 1974 Special Honours (New Zealand) =

Awards list for New Zealand

The 1974 Special Honours in New Zealand were two Special Honours List, published on 3 May and 4 October 1974, in which four judges and a former prime minister received knighthoods.

== Knight Bachelor ==
- The Honourable Mr Justice Alec Leslie Haslam – senior puisne judge of the Supreme Court.
- The Honourable Mr Justice Ian Hannay Macarthur – puisne judge of the Supreme Court.
- The Honourable Mr Justice Arthur Owen Woodhouse DSC – judge of the Court of Appeal.
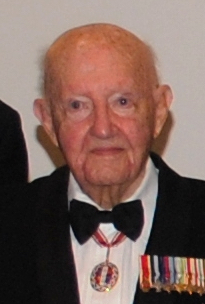
Sir Owen Woodhouse

== Order of the British Empire ==
=== Knight Grand Cross (GBE) ===
Civil division

- The Right Honourable John Ross Marshall CH MP – lately Leader of the Opposition.
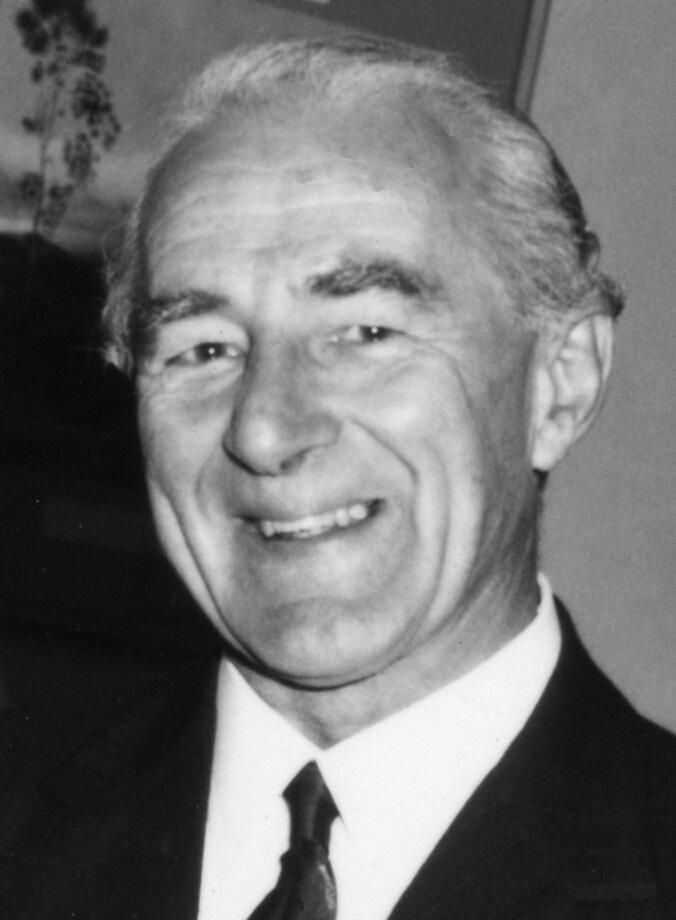
Sir Jack Marshall

=== Knight Commander (KBE) ===
Civil division

- The Right Honourable Sir Thaddeus Pearcey McCarthy – president of the Court of Appeal.
