= Bayley v Public Trustee =

- Court: High Court of New Zealand
- Full case name: Bayley v Public Trustee
- Decided: 15 November 1907
- Citation: [1907] NZGazLawRp 230; (1907) 27 NZLR 659; (1907) 10 GLR 204
- Transcript: http://www.nzlii.org/cgi-bin/sinodisp/nz/cases/NZGazLawRp/1907/230.html

Court membership
- Judge sitting: Cooper J

Bayley v Public Trustee [1907] NZGazLawRp 230; (1907) 27 NZLR 659; (1907) 10 GLR 204 is a cited case in New Zealand case law regarding trusts.
