= Saunderson v Purchase =

- Court: High Court of New Zealand
- Full case name: Saunderson v Purchase
- Decided: 19 February 1958
- Citation: [1958] NZLR 588

Court membership
- Judge sitting: Finlay

Saunderson v Purchase [1958] NZLR 588 is a cited case in New Zealand regarding the joining of two documents to form a written contract under the Contracts Enforcement Act [1956], and reinforces the English case of Timmins v Moreland Street Property Co Ltd [1958] Ch 110.
