= Jason McHerron =

New Zealand High Court judge

The Honourable Jason Scott McHerron

Justice of the High Court
- Incumbent
- Assumed office 19 March 2024

Personal details
- Education: University of Otago
- Profession: Judge, Barrister

Jason Scott McHerron is a High Court Judge in New Zealand. He was appointed to this position by Attorney-General Judith Collins, with his term commencing on 19 March 2024.

McHerron graduated from the University of Otago with a BA in English literature in 1994 and an LLB in 1996. He began his legal career as a solicitor at Russell McVeagh in Wellington, working in litigation, commercial, and public law teams from 1996 to 1999.

In 1999, McHerron joined Crown Law, where he worked as counsel in general public law litigation and advisory roles until 2006 when he transitioned to the independent bar. He specialized in public law and commercial litigation, initially practising from Waterfront Chambers in Wellington, and later joining Woodward Street Chambers in 2014.

McHerron's professional engagements include serving as an investigator with the Gas Industry Co from 2010 to 2018, investigating alleged rule breaches and effecting settlements. Additionally, since 2015, he has been a part-time adjudicator with the Motor Vehicle Disputes Tribunal. From 2018 to 2023, he served on the Rules Committee as a nominee of the New Zealand Law Society.

He is known for his expertise in public law and civil litigation and is a regular contributor to discussions and publications on these topics.
