= Williams v Attorney-General =

- Court: Court of Appeal of New Zealand
- Full case name: Brian Lowther Williams v A-G
- Decided: 12 March 1990
- Citation: [1990] 1 NZLR 646
- Transcript: Court of Appeal judgment

Court membership
- Judges sitting: Cooke P, Richardson J, Casey J, Somers J, Bisson J

Keywords
- negligence

Williams v Attorney-General [1990] 1 NZLR 646 is a cited case in New Zealand regarding liability in tort for negligence cases against the government.

== Background ==
Williams owned a yacht named Nomad and after sailing around Europe, he returned to New Zealand and sold it to a man by the name of Curtis. As Curtis could not pay up front for the boat, Williams loaned him the money, with the boat being used as security for the loan.

The choice of Curtis however turned out to be most unfortunate, as he was a drug smuggler who later became renowned as one of New Zealand's most infamous criminals. In 1979, soon after the sale, Curtis beached the yacht near Westport whilst smuggling drugs into the country.

As well as arresting him for this, Customs seized the boat. In 1982, William managed to get the Minister for Customs to waive the seizure order, but Customs had simply left the boat moored unattended at Westport, resulting in it being damaged and vandalized.

Williams sued Customs for the damage, and was awarded $80,000 in damages.
