= Re Karsten (Deceased) =

1950 New Zealand court case

Re Karsten, (Deceased)
- Court: High Court of New Zealand
- Full case name: Re Karsten, (Deceased)
- Decided: 29 August 1950
- Citation: [1950] NZGazLawRp 92; [1950] NZLR 1022; (1950) 52 GLR 496
- Transcript: High Court judgment

Court membership
- Judge sitting: Gresson J

Karsten, Re (Deceased) [1950] NZGazLawRp 92; [1950] NZLR 1022; (1950) 52 GLR 496 is a cited case in New Zealand regarding incorporation by reference.
