= Howden v Ministry of Transport =

Adam John Howden v Ministry of Transport
- Court: Court of Appeal of New Zealand
- Full case name: Howden v Ministry of Transport
- Decided: 20 November 1987
- Citation: CA195/87 [1987] NZCA 113; [1987] 2 NZLR 747; (1987) 2 CRNZ 417
- Transcript: Court of Appeal judgment

Court membership
- Judges sitting: Cooke P, Somers J, Bisson J, Chilwell

Keywords
- trespass

Howden v Ministry of Transport CA195/87 [1987] NZCA 113; [1987] 2 NZLR 747; (1987) 2 CRNZ 417 is a cited case in New Zealand regarding trespass and the defence of implied licence to enter a property

== Background ==
Howden, one early Sunday morning, was driving home to his parents house in Mosgiel. Unbeknown to him, a MOT traffic officer was following him with the intent to do a random stop on him.

However, before the traffic officer could pull him over, he had reached his destination, and had pulled up his parents driveway and entered the house. The traffic officer then parked his car up the driveway and proceeded to talk to Howden.

Howden was then asked to sit in the patrol car whilst his driving licence details were checked. The officer then parked his car on the Road (a public place), where Howden admitted he had consumed alcohol.

As a result of this statement, he was ordered to perform a breath test, which he failed.

He was charged and later convicted of the offence of driving under the influence of alcohol, being fined $250 and disqualified from driving for 6 months.

Howden subsequently appealed the conviction unsuccessfully to the District Court, on the basis that the breath test was illegally obtained as a result of the traffic officer trespassing, and appealed this time to the High Court.

== Held ==
The court held that although a person has an implied licence to enter a property, this licence can only be actioned in a reasonable manner. Entering a property at 1:30am, most people would find an unreasonable hour. That meant that the Traffic officer was trespassing at the time, making the breath test illegal, resulting in the court overturning the conviction.

Footnote: As a result of this court case, the government soon changed the law to make such situations legal.
