= Parker v Small Smith =

- Court: High Court of New Zealand
- Full case name: Parker v Small Smith
- Citation: (2005) 5 NZCPR 921

Court membership
- Judge sitting: Fogarty J

Parker v Small Smith (2005) 5 NZCPR 921 is a cited case in New Zealand regarding whether a nominee stated in a contract is sufficiently designated in order for the Contracts (Privity) Act 1982 to apply.
