= Jolly v Palmer =

- Court: High Court of New Zealand
- Full case name: Robert Wayne Jolly & Carol Thomas v Gerard Paul Palmer Yvonne Ann Hunt
- Decided: 1 March 1984
- Citation: [1985] 1 NZLR 658
- Transcript: High Court judgment

Court membership
- Judge sitting: Hardie Boys

Jolly v Palmer [1985] 1 NZLR 658 is a cited case in New Zealand regarding the legal enforceability of a contract where there is a breach of a stipulation.

== Background ==
In 1982, the Palmers purchased the Jolly's house for $25,000 under an unconditional purchase agreement.

However, when they tried to apply for a Housing Corp mortgage, they were shocked to discover that the government valuation of the house was not $21,000 as they thought, but only $15,500. This mistake made it very hard to qualify for a mortgage for the house.

Despite knowing this mistake, they then applied to a Building Society for a mortgage, which they were unsuccessful.

The Palmers then tried to cancel the contract due to misrepresentation, and the Jolly's resold the house to a 3rd party for $22,500, and sued them for $4970 in damages.

== Held ==
The court held that the Palmers could not cancel the contract under section 7(4)(b)(ii) as the sale agreement was not subject to them able to arrange suitable finance. Nor could the cancel under 7(4)(b)(i) either, as the judge ruled that a difference of 11% was not "substantial", as the law requires.

The judge also noted that the Palmer's actions here amounted to affirmation of the contract anyway, making any claim of misrepresentation mute.
