= McLaren Transport Ltd v Somerville =

- Court: High Court of New Zealand
- Full case name: McLaren Transport Ltd v Somerville
- Decided: 13 August 1996
- Citation: [1996] 3 NZLR 424

Court membership
- Judge sitting: Tipping J

Keywords
- negligence

McLaren Transport Ltd v Somerville [1996] 3 NZLR 424 is a cited case in New Zealand regarding the awarding of exemplary damages.

== Background ==
Somerville took a hay conditioner to McLaren transport to get a tyre changed. McLaren's employee Stumbles undertook to change the tyre, although he had little training in changing tyres. As Stumbles was unable to find a 15-inch tyre in stock, he then proceeded to try and fit a 15 1/2 inch tyre instead. After 3 attempts at inflating the incorrect sized tyre, it finally exploded, injuring Somerville who was assisting Stumbles with the tyre.

As Somerville was legally barred from suing McLaren for damages for his injury due to Accident Compensation law, he sued instead for exemplary damages, with the District Court awarding $15,000.

McLaren appealed.

== Held ==
The Court ruled that the award for damages was justified.
