= Rayneon (New Zealand) Ltd v Fraser =

- Court: High Court of New Zealand
- Full case name: Rayneon (New Zealand) Limited v Fraser
- Decided: 1940
- Citation: [1940] NZLR 825

Court membership
- Judge sitting: Blair J

Keywords
- frustration

Rayneon (New Zealand) Ltd v Fraser [1940] 1 NZLR 825 is a case often cited in New Zealand regarding the concept of frustration of purpose.

== Background ==
Fraser ran a dental practice, and in 1936 he entered into a contract with Rayneon to lease a neon sign advertising his business. The lease was for a term of 5 years, however in the government passed the Dentists Advertising Regulations (1938) making any advertisements that did not meet the requirements of the regulation illegal. In this case, Schedule 8, which covered illuminated signs, neon signs were not listed as being allowed, thus being illegal. As a result, the dentist ceased paying the remaining lease payments, claiming the contract was now not legally enforceable due to frustration.

Rayneon's position was that only a "lit" neon sign was prohibited, and not the neon tubes and electrical wiring that they supplied the dentist. However, the Regulations also prohibited signs from having lettering greater than 2 inches, and limited the words that could be used on the sign, both of which the sign did not meet.

== Held ==
The court held that due to the new legislation, the contract was now frustrated, meaning that the dentist did not have to pay the remaining lease payments.

Note this case was decided under common law. However the Frustrated Contracts Act (1944) was passed 4 years later.
