= Michele Wilkinson-Smith =

New Zealand High Court judge

The Honourable Michele Wilkinson-Smith
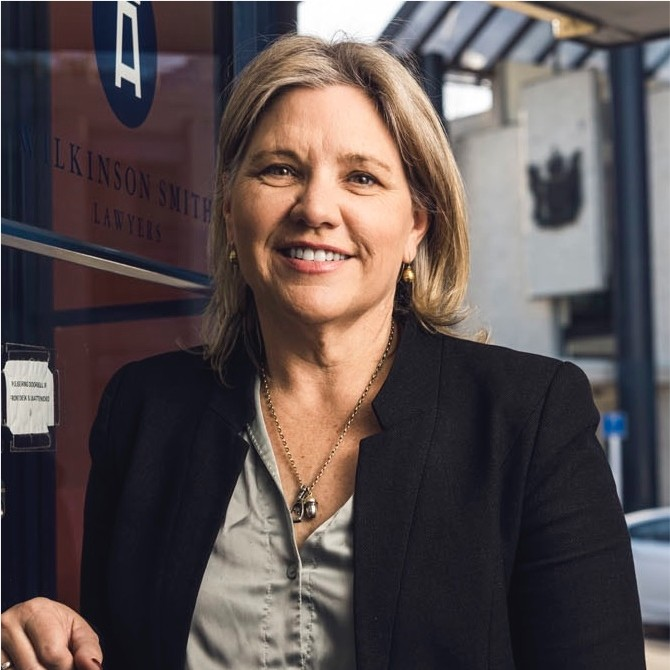

Justice of the High Court
- Incumbent
- Assumed office 1 February 2024
- Appointed by: Attorney-General Judith Collins

Crown Soliciter for Whanganui
- In office 2016–2024
- Preceded by: Lance Rowe
- Succeeded by: Chris Wilkinson-Smith

Personal details
- Spouse: Chris Wilkinson-Smith
- Children: 4
- Education: Auckland University School of Law
- Profession: Judge, solicitor

Michele Marina Wilkinson-Smith is a High Court Judge in New Zealand. She was appointed to this position by Attorney-General Judith Collins. Her appointment took effect on 1 February 2024.

Wilkinson-Smith graduated with an LLB (Hons) from Auckland University School of Law in 1993. She began her legal career as a staff solicitor with Brewer Mazengarb in New Plymouth, later becoming a partner of Auld Brewer Mazengarb and McEwen in 1998. In 2004, she joined the independent bar, practicing as both a defence barrister in Auckland and Crown panel prosecutor in Palmerston North until 2016.

During her career, she was involved in several high-profile cases, including defending Chris Kahui, who was acquitted of murder in a High Court trial. She also served as a member of the Legal Aid Review Panel and as a Visiting Justice at Whanganui Prison.

In 2016, Wilkinson-Smith was appointed Crown solicitor for Whanganui, succeeding Lance Rowe. She and her husband, Chris Wilkinson-Smith, established legal offices in Whanganui.

She has also been a member of the Legal Aid Performance Review Committee since 2015.
