= Sally Fitzgerald =

The Honourable Sally Fitzgerald
- Fitzgerald in 2026

Chief Judge of the High Court
- Incumbent
- Assumed office 20 December 2023
- Preceded by: Susan Thomas

Personal details
- Education: Victoria University of Wellington
- Profession: Lawyer; judge

Sally Erin Fitzgerald is a New Zealand judge who assumed the role of Chief Judge of the High Court on 20 December 2023, following the appointment made by Attorney-General Judith Collins.

Fitzgerald graduated with an LLB (Senior Scholar) from Victoria University of Wellington in 1992 and was admitted to the New Zealand bar in the same year. She began her legal career at the Wellington office of Russell McVeagh in 1992. She later gained international experience in London, where she was admitted as a Solicitor of the Supreme Court of England and Wales in 1999. Returning to New Zealand in 2001, she rejoined Russell McVeagh, eventually becoming a partner. In 2016, she was appointed as a High Court judge.

Her tenure as Chief Judge came amidst significant changes in the judiciary, including the elevation of Justice Forrie Miller from the Court of Appeal to the Supreme Court and the appointment of new judges to various positions within the High Court and Court of Appeal.
