= Re Budge =

- Court: High Court of New Zealand
- Full case name: Estate of Budge (Deceased)
- Citation: 22 June 1942
- Transcript: High Court judgment

Court membership
- Judge sitting: Fair J

Re Budge [1942] NZGazLawRp 43; [1942] NZLR 350; (1942) 44 GLR 282 is a cited case in New Zealand regarding trusts.
