= Slater Wilmhurst Ltd v Crown Group Custodian Ltd =

- Court: High Court of New Zealand
- Full case name: Slater Wilmhurst Ltd v Crown Group Custodian Ltd
- Decided: 21 September 1990
- Citation: [1991] 1 NZLR 344

Court membership
- Judge sitting: Gallen J

Slater Wilmhurst Ltd v Crown Group Custodian Ltd [1991] 1 NZLR 344 is a cited case in New Zealand regarding common mistake.

== Background ==
In 1980, Slater Wilmhurst, a property developer, built a retail building in Lower Hutt, and arranged the retailer Hallenstein Bros to lease the building, with the lease agreement giving them first right of purchase. Slater sold the building to Crown Group Custodians.

In 1986, Slater Wilmhurst wanted to purchase the building back as an investment, and Crown agreed to sell it back to them for $1.785 million. One month later, Slater Wilmhurst accepted an offer from Cromwell Corporation to sell the building for $2.587 million.

However, this time, Cromwell's solicitors did a title search, which brought to their attention of Hallensteins right to purchase, and upon contacting Hallensteins to confirm whether they wanted to exercise their option, the elected to purchase the building.

Slater Wilmhurst sued the Crown for selling the building without title. The court ruled in favour of Slater Wilmhurst and awarded damages of $345,000.
