= Attorney-General v Rutherford =

A-G v Rutherford
- Court: High Court of New Zealand
- Full case name: A-G v Rutherford
- Decided: 16 October 1975
- Citation: [1976] 1 NZLR 403

Court membership
- Judge sitting: Cooke J

Keywords
- negligence

A-G v Rutherford [1976] 1 NZLR 403 is a cited case in New Zealand regarding liability in tort for negligent misstatements.

== Background ==
Rutherford was purchasing a bulldozer, and was interested in purchasing the 20-year-old International truck that the seller used to haul it. Eventually, he agreed to purchase the truck for $1,700 provided it first passed a new COF, and he subsequently arranged for the Ministry of Transport Te Awamutu branch to inspect the vehicle.

On the first inspection, the MOT only found several minor faults, and when the vehicle was brought back for a second inspection, it was duly issued with a certificate of fitness and a certificate of inspection.

Within 2 weeks after purchasing the vehicle, Rutherford discovered the truck had a serious fault, which the two inspections had failed to notice, and after removing the current COF certificate, took it to the Hamilton branch for inspection, where not only did they refused to issue a new COF, but were so concerned with the state of the vehicle, Rutherford had great difficulty in getting the vehicle back to drive home for the repairs.

Rutherford sued the MOT, as well as the vendor in the District Court for the $1,083.83 in repairs the truck needed, but was unsuccessful in both claims, as the judge said Rutherford could have inspected the truck himself and discovered the fault.

He appealed to the High Court.

== Held ==
The High Court ruled in favour of Rutherford, as even though the MOT were unlikely to know that the purpose of the inspection was for the purchase of the truck, it was at least a possibility. In overruling the District Court judge's rationale that Rutherford could have mitigated the loss by inspecting the vehicle himself, Cooke J said that Rutherford could have relied on the inspection certificate here due to it having been recently issued at the time of purchase.
