= Pendergast v Attorney-General =

Court case

- Court: High Court of New Zealand
- Full case name: Pendergast v Attorney-General
- Citation: (1998) 3 NZ ConvC 192,729

Court membership
- Judge sitting: Penlington J

Pendergast v Attorney-General (1998) 3 NZ ConvC 192,729 is a cited case in New Zealand regarding the availability of rectification if a unilateral mistake exists.

== Background ==
Pendergast had a 33-year perpetual renewable lease with a Domain Board, part of the Waipa District Council. During the lease renewal, a new lease agreement was prepared. Unbeknown to Pendergast, the Domain Board hid a clause in the new lease removing any right to renew the lease.

Without first seeking legal advice, Pendergast signed the new lease since he thought that just the rental had been changed.

== Decision ==
Pendergast's claim for rectification succeeded, with the right of renewal clause being ordered to be included in the new lease. Penlington J said, "This aspect of the law relating to rectification is based on the equitable principle of fair dealing between the parties".
