= Hughes v Huppert =

- Court: High Court of New Zealand
- Full case name: Hughes v Huppert
- Decided: 24 October 1998
- Citation: [1991] 1 NZLR 474

Court membership
- Judge sitting: Gallen J

Hughes v Huppert [1991] 1 NZLR 474 is a cited case in New Zealand regarding affirmation.
