= Matheson v Northcote College Board of Governors =

- Court: High Court of New Zealand
- Full case name: Matheson and Another v Northcote College Board of Governors
- Decided: 7 March 1975
- Citation: [1975] 2 NZLR 106

Court membership
- Judge sitting: McMullin

Matheson v Northcote College Board of Governors [1975] 2 NZLR 106 is a cited case regarding claims in tort for nuisance.

== Background ==
Matheson's house was next door to Northcote College, and due to its proximity, students from the college frequently left litter, cigarette butts, etc. on his property, as well as stealing fruit from his fruit trees. Matheson sued the college for nuisance.
