= Wellington City Council v Dominion Budget Rent a Car Ltd (in liq) =

- Court: High Court of New Zealand
- Full case name: Wellington City Council v Dominion Budget Rent a Car Ltd (in liq)
- Decided: 15 April 1988
- Transcript: High Court judgment

Court membership
- Judge sitting: Eichelbaum J

Wellington City Council v Dominion Budget Rent a Car Ltd (in liq) HC Wellington CP105/87 [1988] NZHC 145 is a cited case in New Zealand regard property law.
