= French v Auckland City Council =

- Court: High Court of New Zealand
- Full case name: French v Auckland City Council
- Decided: 10 August 1973
- Citation: [1974] 1 NZLR 340

Court membership
- Judge sitting: McMullin J

Keywords
- negligence

French v Auckland City Council [1974] 1 NZLR 340 is a cited case in New Zealand regarding land based nuisance claims in tort.

== Background ==
French leased some land in Glendowie. Auckland City owned some of the neighbouring land.

Initially, both parties land were infested with weeds, until French started a weed eradication program, whilst the council did not.

As a result of the weeds on the council land, their seeds continually reinfested French's land.

Eventually, French sued the council for nuisance.

== Held ==
The court awarded French $799.39 in damages for weed eradication.
