= March Construction Ltd v Christchurch City Council =

- Court: High Court of New Zealand
- Full case name: March Construction Ltd v Christchurch City Council
- Decided: 20 February 1995
- Citation: (1995) 6 TCLR 394

Court membership
- Judge sitting: Wlliamson J

March Construction Ltd v Christchurch City Council (1995) 6 TCLR 394 is a cited case that in general, silence does not constitute misrepresentation in contract.

== Background ==
March Construction tendered for some work from the Christchurch City Council. However, in their tender, their employee entered into their calculations, a sum of $72.75, when they should have used $727.50. This resulted in the unit price being quoted as $250, instead of $968.

After the council had accepted March's tender, the mistake was discovered by March, and they subsequently sought relief from the court, claiming that the council's silence on the mistake constituted misrepresentation.

== Held ==
The court refused relief, stating the council had no legal obligation to point out to March that they had made a mistake in their tender price.
