= Walmsley v Christchurch City Council =

- Court: High Court of New Zealand
- Full case name: Walmsley v Christchurch City Council
- Decided: 29 September 1989
- Citation: [1990] 1 NZLR 199

Court membership
- Judge sitting: Hardie Boys

Walmsley v Christchurch City Council [1990] 1 NZLR 199 is a cited case in New Zealand regarding economic duress.

== Background ==
In 1987, the Christchurch Airport Authority (part of the Christchurch City Council) was running the Christchurch Airport's Golden Jubilee Air Show and International Air Race.

Walmsley, trading as Markat promotions. was employed to publish the souvenir programme for the show. In return for printing the programme, Markat was to receive a $1 per brochure royalty, plus the revenue for any advertising it sold.

Within a month of the show, Markat presented the printed programmes to the council. However, the council found numerous typographical errors, as well as finding some of the type faces used unattractive.

Overall, they found it "substandard", and so much so they refused to accept it, and requested it be reprinted at Markat's cost. Markat declined to do so.

In reply, the council said that if Markat did not arrange the programme to be reprinted, then they would issue no programme. This would have cost Markat its advertising revenue, and so they reluctantly agreed to reimburse the council the $34,694 + GST it would cost to reprint.

In return, the council agreed to increase the royalty to $2 for every programme sold in excess of 20,000.

However, later when Markat were asked to pay the council for the reprinting, they refused, claiming they only agreed to the new contract due to economic duress.

Markat sued the council for payment under the first agreement, for which the council counterclaimed.

== Held ==
The Court held that there was no economic duress used to get Markat to enter into the second contract. It was merely legitimate pressure to resolve a genuine dispute. Hardie Boys said "There was certainly pressure, but it was legitimate and unavoidable in the circumstances, and Mr Walmsley's consent was a genuine recognition of the situation".
