= Pearson v Aotea District Maori Land Board =

New Zealand legal case

- Court: High Court of New Zealand
- Full case name: Pearson v Aotea District Maori Land Board
- Citation: [1945] NZGazLawRp 39; [1945] NZLR 542; (1945) 47 GLR 205
- Transcript: http://www.nzlii.org/cgi-bin/sinodisp/nz/cases/NZGazLawRp/1945/39.html

Pearson v Aotea District Maori Land Board [1945] NZGazLawRp 39; [1945] NZLR 542; (1945) 47 GLR 205 is a cited case in New Zealand regarding property law.
