= Herbison v Papakura Video Ltd =

Herbison v Papakura Video Ltd.
- Court: High Court of New Zealand
- Full case name: David Glass Herbison & Grant Alastair Goodare (First Plaintiffs), Paris Ventures Limited (Second Plaintiff) v Papakura Video Limited (First Defendant), Patrick Anthony Darby (Second Defendant), Norah Anne Darby (Third Defendant)
- Decided: 12 December 1987
- Citation: [1987] 2 NZLR 527
- Transcript: High Court judgment

Court membership
- Judge sitting: Henry J

Keywords
- exclusion clause

Herbison v Papakura Video Ltd [1987] 2 NZLR 527 is a cited case in New Zealand regarding the enforceability of Exclusion clauses.

== Background ==
Herbison purchased a video hire business from Papakura Video Limited. The price was agreed too after substantial negotiations between the parties. Importantly, both parties agreed to a clause of "Otherwise the purchaser enters into this agreement relying upon his own judgment and not his own judgment and not on any representation or warranty made by the vendor except as expressed in the agreement".

Subsequent to the sale, the purchaser discovered the financial records provided by the seller were inaccurate, and sued the seller for damages, who later defended this claim with the exclusion clause.

== Held ==
The court held that considering all the facts in the case, the exclusion clause was legally valid. On this, Henry J said "...the factors to be taken into account in deciding whether it is fair and reasonable that the disclaimer should be conclusive:

In favour of conclusiveness:

1. The transaction involved the sale of a business at the reasonably substantial figure of $385,000.

2. There was no disparity between the respective bargaining strengths of the parties.

3. Both parties were in receipt of competent legal advice at the time of critical negotiation.

4. The precise wording of special terms, included in which was the disclaimer, was the subject of detailed negotiation before being finalised.

5. The very schedule which comprises the misrepresentation was included as a warranted document in a draft of the agreement and was men deliberately and knowingly replaced by the monthly analysis of receipts.

6. Both [parties] were experienced in business and had taken the precaution of employing specialist accounting assistance before agreeing to purchase.

7. The disclaimer is not part of a standard form of agreement but is contained in the body of a clause specially drafted with particularity which carefully sets out the representations upon which the purchasers rely and expressly excludes all others.

Against conclusiveness:

8. The purchasers in fact placed reliance on the accuracy of the monthly figures.

9. The hire component as a proportion of turnover was an aspect important to the purchasers.

10. The monthly figures bear a close relationship to material included in the contractual documents. Looked at overall, I have reached the conclusion that the balance is weighted, quite strongly, in favour of the vendor and that in all the circumstances the provision should be given effect and be conclusive as between the parties. The result of this is that the misrepresentation is of no effect and cannot afford the plaintiffs a ground for relief."''
