= Wilson v New Brighton Panelbeaters Ltd =

- Court: High Court of New Zealand
- Full case name: Dean Anthony Wilson v New Brighton Panelbeaters Limited
- Decided: 25 August 1988
- Citation: [1989] 1 NZLR 74
- Transcript: http://www.nzlii.org/nz/cases/NZHC/1988/457.pdf

Court membership
- Judge sitting: Tipping J

Keywords
- negligence

Wilson v New Brighton Panelbeaters Ltd [1989] 1 NZLR 74 is a cited case in New Zealand regarding interference of goods.

== Background ==
The plaintiff left his Hillman Hunter car parked in his carport, and whilst he was away at the nearby beach, as what had been described as a cruel hoax, an unknown person arranged for New Brighton Panelbeaters to tow the car away. The car was never recovered.

The plaintiff sued for damages for trespass, as well as for conversion.

== Held ==
Judgment for the plaintiff.
