= Markholm Construction Co Ltd v Wellington City Council =

New Zealand contract law case

- Court: High Court of New Zealand
- Full case name: Markholm Construction Co Ltd (First Plaintiff) & Mark William Stephen Markholm (Second Plaintiff)v Wellington City Council
- Decided: 6 August 1984
- Citation: [1985] 2 NZLR 520
- Transcript: High Court judgment

Court membership
- Judge sitting: Jeffries J

Markholm Construction Co Ltd v Wellington City Council [1985] 2 NZLR 520 is a cited case in New Zealand regarding contract formation.

== Background ==
The Wellington City Council had advertised sections for sale by ballot in a new subdivision. After finding this ballot heavily oversubscribed, the council realised that the sections had been significantly undervalued.

As a result, the council refused to go through with the ballot, and cancelled the ballot.

The Markholm's sued the council for specific performance for the contract - to go through with the sale of the sections by ballot.

== Held ==
The court ruled it was a legally binding contract. However, the court refused to order specific performance given the odds of winning in the ballot, and damages instead were awarded.
