= Re Amelia Bullock-Webster =

- Court: High Court of New Zealand
- Full case name: Amelia Bullock-Webster, Re
- Decided: 28 August 1936
- Citation: [1936] NZGazLawRp 144; [1936] NZLR 814; (1936) 36 GLR 709
- Transcript: http://www.nzlii.org/cgi-bin/sinodisp/nz/cases/NZGazLawRp/1936/144.html

Amelia Bullock-Webster, Re [1936] NZGazLawRp 144; [1936] NZLR 814; (1936) 36 GLR 709 is a cited case in New Zealand case law regarding trusts.
