= Ladstone Holdings Ltd v Leonora Holdings Ltd =

- Court: High Court of New Zealand
- Full case name: Ladstone Holdings Ltd v Leonora Holdings Ltd
- Decided: 17 May 2004
- Citation: [2006] 1 NZLR 211

Court membership
- Judge sitting: Potter J

Ladstone Holdings Ltd v Leonora Holdings Ltd [2006] 1 NZLR 211 is a cited case in New Zealand regarding that silence on a matter does not constitute misrepresentation.
