= Gregory v Rangitikei =

- Court: High Court of New Zealand
- Full case name: Gregory v Rangitikei District Council
- Citation: [1995] 2 NZLR 208, (1994) 6 TCLR 199

Court membership
- Judge sitting: McGechan J

Gregory v Rangitikei [1995] 2 NZLR 208, (1994) 6 TCLR 199 is a cited case in New Zealand regarding the sale of property by tender, confirming that an offer inviting tenders to be submitted for the purchase of something did not amount to an offer capable of acceptance to sell that property, but instead merely amounted to an invitation to treat. It reinforces the English case of Spencer v Harding (1870) LR 5 CP 561. However the Court also ruled that there was a breach of the Fair Trading Act (1986).

== Background ==
The RDC advertised some surplus land for sale by tender, with the important caveat of "highest or any tender not necessarily accepted". During the tender process, the RDC discovered that they had previously agreed to sell the property to a neighbouring property owner Roberts.

Ultimately, Gregory was the highest tenderer, although his offer did not meet the council's reserve, and the council declined all tenders. The RDC then proceeded to exclusively negotiate a sale to Roberts, without giving Gregory a chance to purchase the property.

== Held ==
The court held that calling a tender is merely an invitation to treat, and so gave none of the tenderers any legal rights. However, it was a breach of section 9 of the Fair Trading Act, and Gregory was awarded damages.
