= Van Kleef v Colonial Mutual General Insurance Co (NZ) Ltd =

- Court: High Court of New Zealand
- Full case name: J C Van Kleef v Colonial Mutual General Insurance Co (NZ) Ltd
- Decided: 24 May 2001
- Transcript: copy of judgment

Court membership
- Judge sitting: McGechan J

Van Kleef v Colonial Mutual General Insurance Co (NZ) Ltd is a cited case in New Zealand regarding remoteness of loss.
