= Haynes House =

Haynes House may refer to:

- Alexander Haynes House, DeLand, Florida, listed on the National Register of Historic Places (NRHP)
- Tidwell-Amis-Haynes House, Senoia, Georgia, listed on the NRHP in Georgia
- John and Dorothy Haynes House, Fort Wayne, Indiana, NRHP-listed
- Elwood Haynes Museum, Kokomo, Indiana, NRHP-listed
- Lemuel Haynes House, South Granville, New York, NRHP-listed
- Haynes House (Decherd, Tennessee), listed on the NRHP in Tennessee
- Tipton-Haynes State Historic Site, Johnson City, Tennessee, NRHP-listed

== See also ==
- Haines House (disambiguation)
