= McLaren v McLaren =

Case in New Zealand law

- Court: High Court of New Zealand
- Full case name: McLaren v McLaren
- Decided: 16 July 1919
- Citation: [1919] NZGazLawRp 83; (1919) 21 GLR 287
- Transcript: http://www.nzlii.org/cgi-bin/sinodisp/nz/cases/NZGazLawRp/1919/83.html

Court membership
- Judge sitting: Chapman J

McLaren v McLaren [1919] NZGazLawRp 83; (1919) 21 GLR 287 is a cited case in New Zealand regarding succession wills.
