= Thexton v Thexton =

- Court: Auckland High Court
- Decided: 8 November 2000
- Citation: [2001] 1 NZLR 237

Case history
- Subsequent action: [2002] 1 NZLR 780

Court membership
- Judge sitting: Salmon J

Keywords
- Equity (law), Trust law, Three certainties

Thexton v Thexton is an important case in New Zealand trust law, applying the principle that burden of establishing an intention to create a trust rests on the person alleging it.

== Background ==
The background of the case was a family dispute over the ownership of shares in a family business. The critical question before the court was whether the son held shares in trust for his father.

== Judgment ==
Justice Salmon ruled, applying the principle of Herdegan v Federal Commissioner of Taxation 1988 84 ALR 271; "The burden of establishing that there was an intention to create a trust is on the person who alleges that a trust was created." Salmon J also held that inferring an intention does not require technical words and may come from a person's acts;

If the trust is not completely constituted then absent consideration on the part of the beneficiary, the trust is not binding on the settlor: equity will not assist a volunteer. A declaration of trust does not require a technical form of expression, it is a question of construction whether the words used, taking into account the surrounding circumstances, amount to a clear declaration of trust. What is needed is the manifestation of an intention to declare a trust: Paul v Constance [1977] 1 All ER 195. Where no words exhibiting the necessary intent are used it may in exceptional cases be possible to infer a declaration of trust from acts showing that a person has constituted themselves as trustee, ie from conduct evincing an intent to deal with his property so that somebody else to his own exclusion acquires the beneficial interest in his property.

— Salmon J, Thexton v Thexton'
