= Tak and Co Inc v AEL Corp Ltd =

New Zealand case law

Tak and Co Inc v AEL Corp Ltd (First Defendant), J Gillooly (Second Defendant), M Smith (Third Defendant), H Cleland (Fourth Defendant)
- Court: High Court of New Zealand
- Full case name: Tak and Co Incorporated v AEL Corporation Limited
- Decided: 26 July 1995
- Citation: (1995) 5 NZBLC 103,887
- Transcript: http://www.nzlii.org/nz/cases/NZHC/1995/361.pdf

Court membership
- Judge sitting: Hammond J

Keywords
- parol evidence rule, exemplary damages

Tak and Co Inc v AEL Corp Ltd (1995) 5 NZBLC 103,887 is an often cited in NZ case law regarding the parol evidence rule, which effectively reinforces English case of Henderson v Arthur [1907] 1 KB 10. This case is often also cited regarding the award for exemplary damages.

== Background ==
Tak was in the business of importing pedigree cattle into Japan and contracted AEL to certify that these cattle were indeed pedigree cattle.

At the start, both parties signed a pro forma invoice with terms and conditions. A pro forma invoice is a document that states a commitment from the seller to sell goods to the buyer at specified prices and terms.

Unfortunately, it was later discovered that AEL had falsified its records for the livestock it exported, so extensively that it was found that out of 185 heifers on the first shipment, AEL had falsely certified 111 commercial cattle as pedigree. The second shipment had similar falsified certificates.

Tak not happy with this, sued AEL for damages for breach of contract under the terms and conditions contained in the pro forma invoice, as well as for exemplary damages as well.

AEL defended this by claiming the pro forma invoice conditions were not part of the contract, but instead were merely "understandings" that were not confirmed in the subsequent invoices.

== Held ==
The court ruled the terms and conditions in the pro forma invoice were part of the contract. Hammond J went on to state:

It is hard to think of a clearer illustration of the appropriateness of the parol evidence rule

Furthermore, besides awarding general damages, the court also awarded the modest amount of $25,000 in exemplary damages for "knowingly deceitful conduct".
