= Queenstown Lakes District Council v Palmer =

- Court: Court of Appeal of New Zealand
- Full case name: Queenstown Lakes District Council v Mark Thomas Palmer
- Decided: 2 November 1998
- Citation: CA83/98 [1998] NZCA 190; [1999] 1 NZLR 549
- Transcript: Court of Appeal judgment

Court membership
- Judges sitting: Richardson J, Gault, Blanchard J, Tipping J, Thomas J

Keywords
- negligence

Queenstown Lakes District Council v Palmer CA83/98 [1998] NZCA 190; [1999] 1 NZLR 549 is a cited case in New Zealand regarding the claiming of damages for nervous shock from witnessing an accident. .

== Background ==
Mark Palmer and his wife were tourists from the US, and went white water rafting on the Shotover River.

Tragedy struck, when his wife drowned in the river, and whilst Palmer did not suffer any physical injuries, he suffered post traumatic injury for witnessing her death.

Palmer sued the rafting company and the local council for damages for his mental injuries.

The council defended the matter by claiming that the ACC law prohibited awarding damages for injury in NZ.

However, Thomas J said the law was changed in 1992 with the Accident Rehabilitation Act, where section 14(1) now excluded cover for mental injury for witnessing an accident.

== Held ==
The Court of Appeal confirmed that section 14(1) now allowed people to sue for mental injury resulting in witnessing an accident.
