= Vickery v Waitaki International Ltd =

- Court: Court of Appeal of New Zealand
- Full case name: Vickery v Waitaki International Ltd
- Decided: 5 November 1991
- Citation: [1992] 2 NZLR 58

Court membership
- Judges sitting: Cooke P, Richardson J, Gault

Vickery v Waitaki International Ltd [1992] 2 NZLR 58 is a cited case in New Zealand regarding terms implied by the Courts to give "business efficacy" to a contract that would have otherwise been unworkable.
