= McCarthy v Wellington City =

- Court: Court of Appeal of New Zealand
- Full case name: McCarthy v Wellington City
- Decided: 14 May 1965
- Citation: [1966] NZLR 481

Court membership
- Judges sitting: North P, Turner J, McCarthy J

Keywords
- negligence

McCarthy v Wellington City [1966] NZLR 481 is a cited case in New Zealand regarding the legal issue of causation involving negligence cases in tort.

== Background ==
The council had left a safe containing explosives unfastened to the ground and without any warning signs in a local quarry.

Some boys from a nearby suburb managed to open the safe by pulling out the pins on the hinges and took the explosives from the safe home with them.

The boys later gave some of the explosives to another boy, who later had one of the detonators explode in his hand, causing injury.

His parents sued the council for negligence. The council defended the matter by arguing that the injury was unforeseeable, and even if it was foreseeable, causation had been broken by the intervening act of a third party, namely by the boy giving the injured boy the detonator.

== Held ==
The High Court ruled that the injury was foreseeable, and awarded damages, and this judgment was later upheld by the Court of Appeal.

Footnote: The Accident Compensation Act [1974] now bars such a claim
