= Money v Ven-Lu-Ree Ltd =

- Court: Privy Council
- Full case name: Richard John Money (Appellant) v Robert Arthur Playle, David Larkin & Pukieto Fale (First Respondents), Ven-Lu-Ree Ltd (Second Respondent), Stuart Craig Ennor (Third Respondent)
- Decided: 27 July 1989
- Citation: [1988] 2 NZLR 414, aff'd [1989] 3 NZLR 129
- Transcript: Privy Council ruling Court of Appeal judgment

Court membership
- Judges sitting: Lord Bridge of Harwich, Lord Ackner, Lord Goff of Chieveley, Lord Jauncey of Tullichettle, Lord Lowry

Money v Ven-Lu-Ree Ltd [1988] 2 NZLR 414, aff'd [1989] 3 NZLR 129 is a cited case in New Zealand regarding the issue of certainty in contract formation.

== Background ==
Richard Money was a shareholder in Ven-Lu-Ree Ltd, and on 9 November 1986 he agreed to sell his shares at valuation to the other shareholders. Both parties were each to appoint an accountant to set the value of the shares.

Unfortunately, there was no mechanism if the accountants could not agree to a valuation, such as an arbitration clause.

The matter ended up in the High Court where the judge said that it was implied that such a matter go to arbitration, and the judge referred this issue to arbitration.

== Decision ==
The Court of Appeal upheld the High Court's decision to refer the matter to arbitration. However, the court did say that even if the matter was not subject to arbitration, the agreement to sell at valuation was certain enough that the Court itself could have decided on the valuation.

The Privy Council later affirmed this decision.
