= Van Soest v Residual Health Management Unit =

- Court: Court of Appeal of New Zealand
- Full case name: J&P Van Soest v Residual Health Management Unit and K Ramstead
- Decided: 27 September 1999
- Citation: [2001] 1 NZLR 179
- Transcript: Court of Appeal judgment

Court membership
- Judges sitting: Gault J, Thomas J, Henry J, Keith J, Blanchard J

Keywords
- negligence

Van Soest v Residual Health Management Unit [2001] 1 NZLR 179 is a cited case in New Zealand regarding nervous shock cases.

== Background ==
This case involves relatives of patients that died during surgery under surgeon Keith Ramstead at Christchurch Hospital.

The relatives sued the Residual Health Management in tort for the nervous shock that they suffered as a result of having a relative die.

== Held ==
The Court of Appeal rejected the relatives claim, as they were only claiming they suffered grief, holding that the law required a higher standard for a nervous shock case to be successful.
