= Oxborough v North Harbour Builders Ltd =

High Court of New Zealand case

- Court: High Court of New Zealand
- Full case name: Andrew & Gaye Oxborough v North Harbour Builders Ltd & Regency Designer Homes Ltd
- Decided: 29 March 2001
- Transcript: High Court judgment

Court membership
- Judge sitting: Nicholson J

Oxborough v North Harbour Builders Ltd is a cited case in New Zealand regarding repudiation.

== Background ==
In 1999, the Oxborough's entered into a contract with a builder to build them a house, with construction to start in March, and to be completed by July.

However, early on in the build, the Oxboroughs complained about some of the workmanship, resulting in the builders in May to start remedial work to the house.

In August, the Oxboroughs informed the builders that they were cancelling the contract, claiming that the builder was repudiating the contract, and demanding that the builder to remove the nearly completed house and to refund all the money they had previously paid the builder.

== Held ==
The evidence did not prove that the builders did not intend to complete the contract.
