= Oxborough Dirk =

Ceremonial object from the Middle Bronze Age

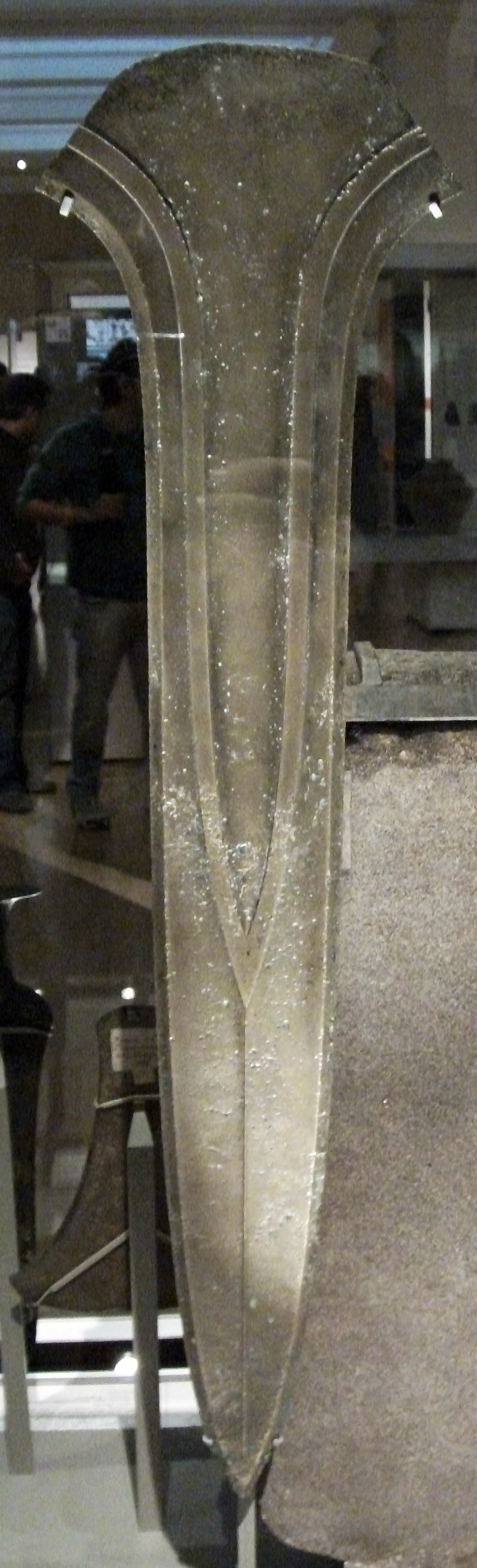
- The Oxborough Dirk at the British Museum
- Material: Bronze
- Size: 70.9 cm (27.9 in) long
- Weight: 2.36 kilograms (5.2 lb)
- Created: 1450–1300 BC
- Discovered: 1988; Near Oxborough, Norfolk
- Present location: British Museum, London
- Registration: 1994,1003.1

The Oxborough Dirk is a large ceremonial weapon or dirk from the Middle Bronze Age. One of only six such objects across Europe, it was found in a rural part of the county of Norfolk, England in the 1980s and is now part of the British Museum's prehistoric collection.

== Discovery ==
It was found by chance in 1988 protruding from a peat bog near Oxborough, Norfolk, where it had been deposited point down. A walker had discovered it in woods near the village by accidentally tripping up on the base of the sword. Six years after its discovery, the sword was purchased by the British Museum with the support of the National Art Collections Fund.

== Rare find ==
The Oxborough find is one of only six large dirks known in north-west Europe, though excessively large versions of other types of objects from this era are also recorded. The six are so similar that they may have been made in the same workshop, in which case this one could have been imported in to Britain from the continent. The six almost identical swords have been found across three countries in western Europe: two in France, two in the Netherlands and two in England. All six of these very rare swords are labelled the Plougrescant–Ommerschans type, after two of the sites from where they were found.

The others were discovered in Beaune and Jutphaas and a second in Norfolk. The Beaune example is also in the British Museum's collection. The second Norfolk example is in the collection of Norwich Castle Museum and was found in East Rudham.

== Description ==
The Oxborough Dirk is dated to between 1450–1300 BC and measures 70.9 centimetres (27.9 in) long with a mass of 2.37 kilograms (5.2 lb), making it "ridiculously large and unwieldy" and clearly never intended for practical use, which the lack of holes on the hilt for fitting a handle also demonstrates. It was probably either a votive offering or a store of value that could be retrieved at a later time. It is currently on display in Room 50 at the British Museum.

== Gallery ==
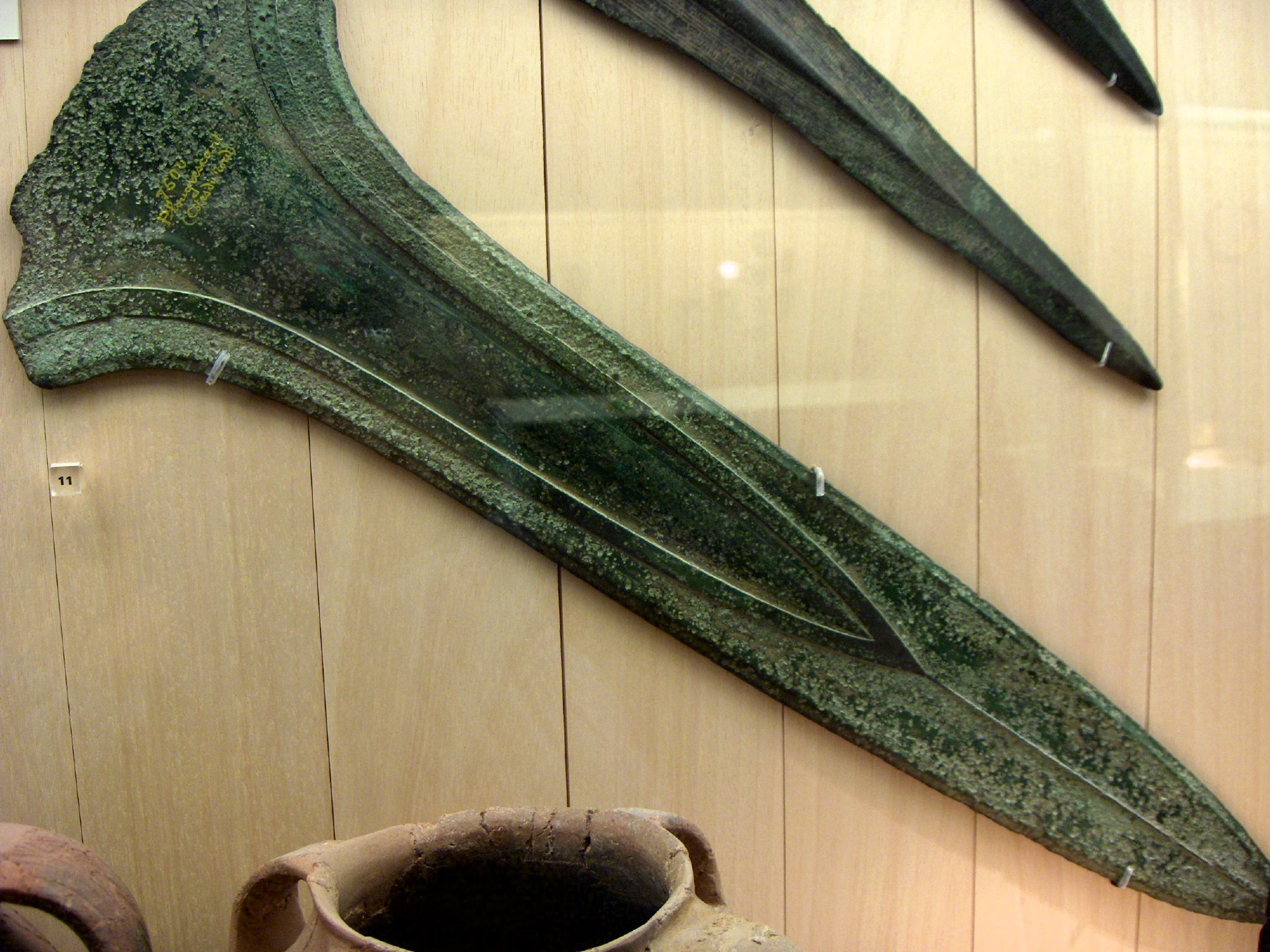
The Plougrescant Dirk in the Musee des Antiquites Nationales, Saint-Germain-en-Laye, France

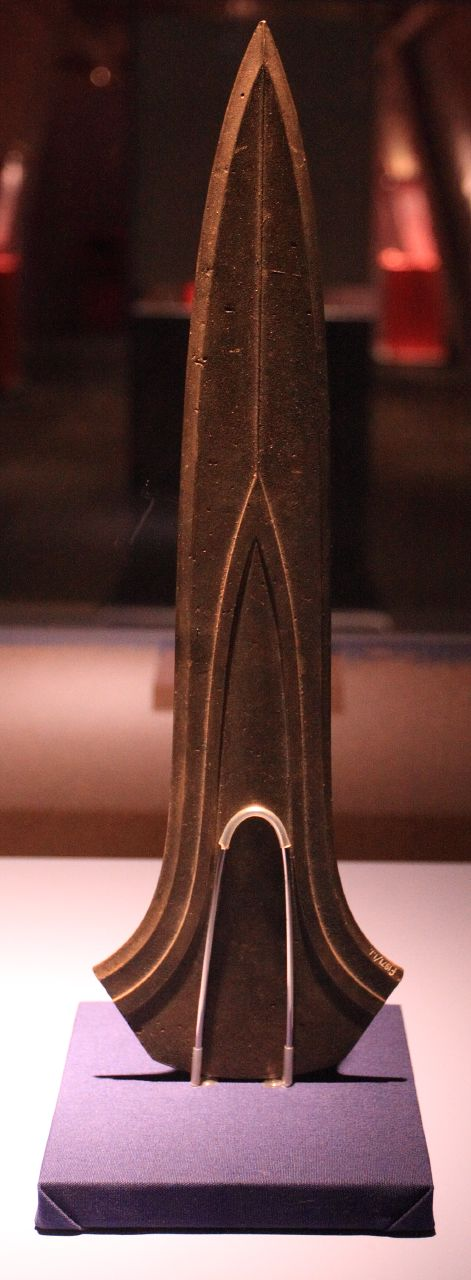
Jutphaas Dirk in the National Museum of Antiquities in Leiden

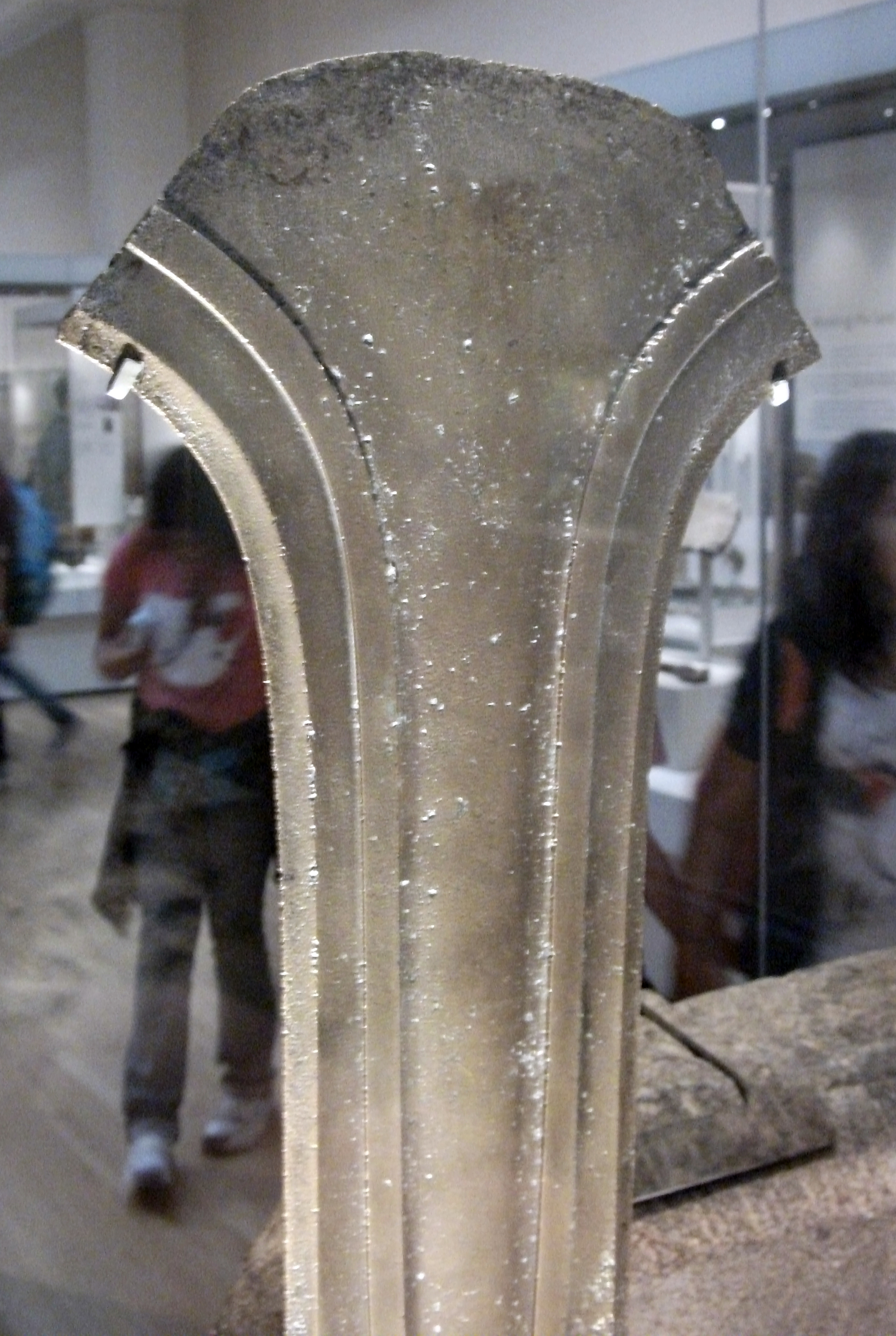
Detail of the hilt from the Oxborough Dirk

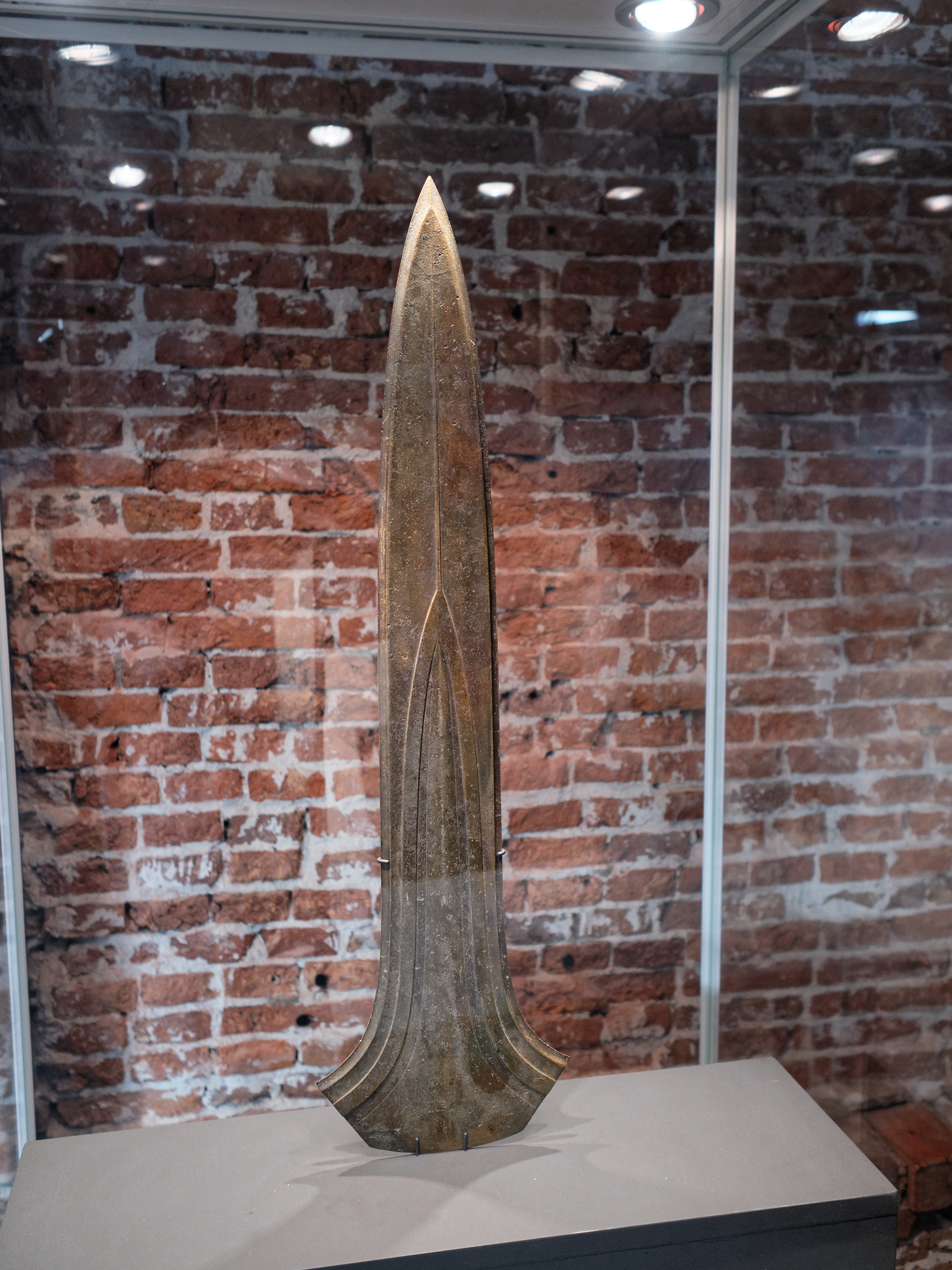
Ommerschans Dirk in the National Museum of Antiquities in Leiden

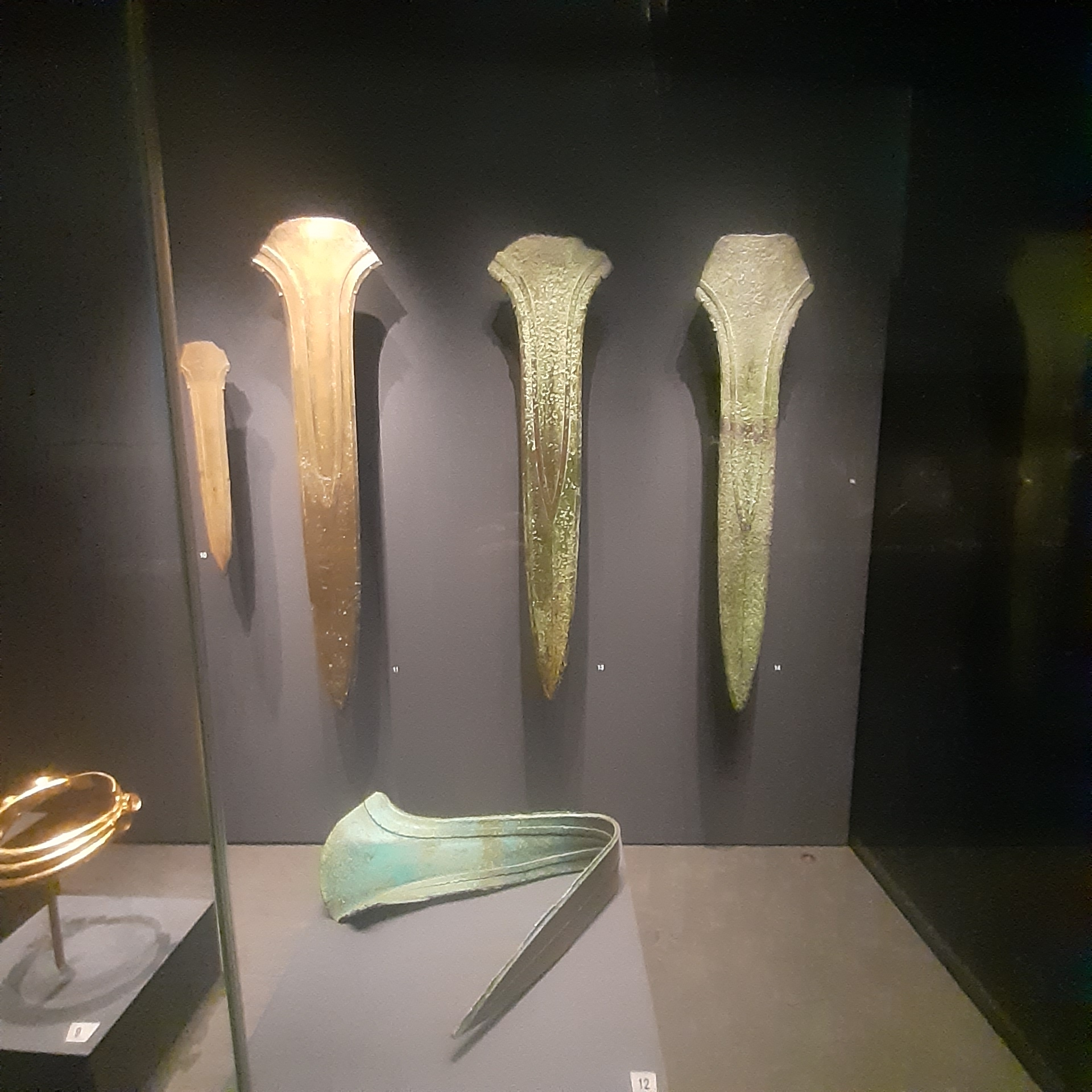
Dirks from Kimberley, Oxborough, Plougrescant, Beaune and East Rudham respectively in The World of Stonehenge exhibition, British Museum (2022)

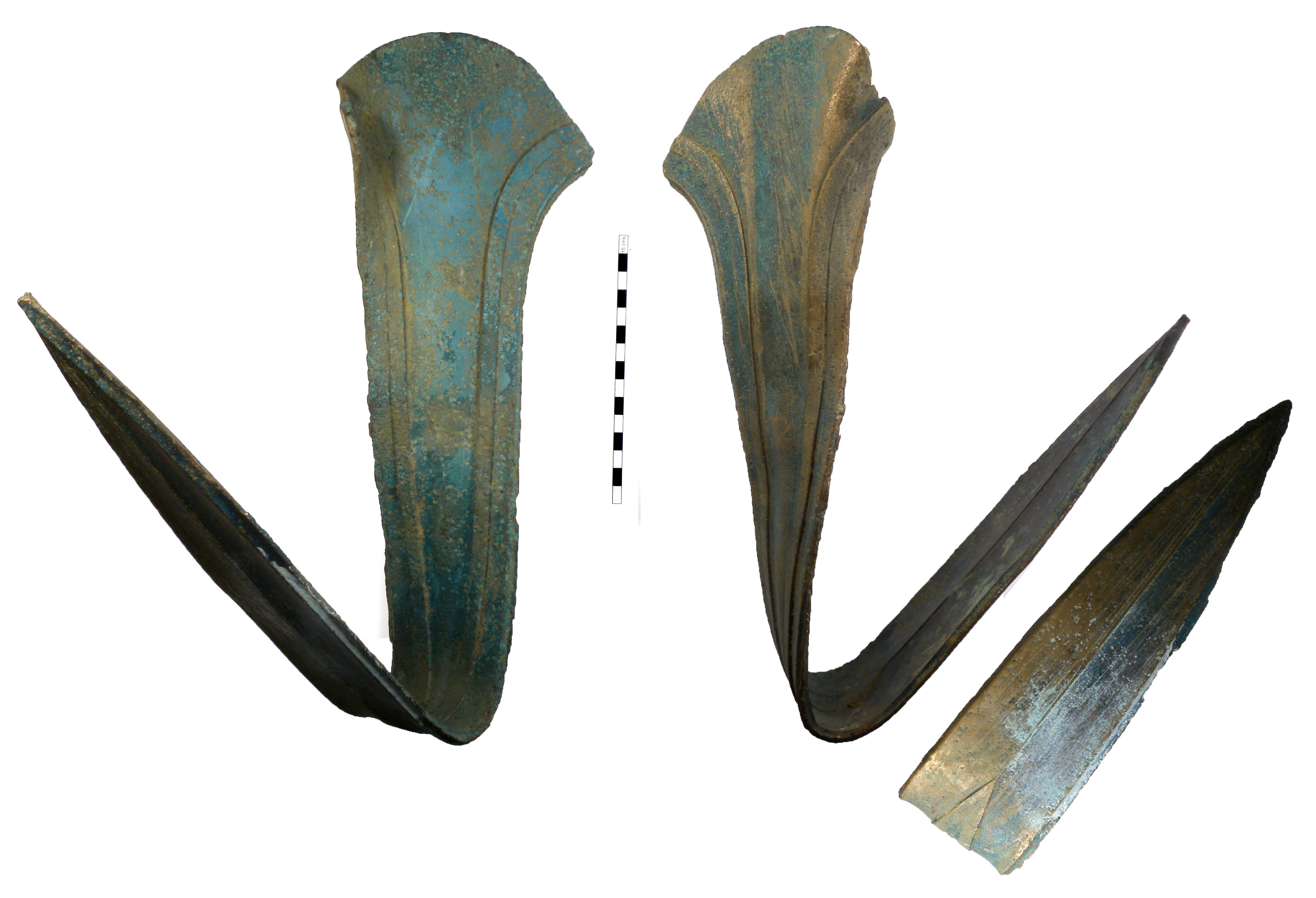
The Rudham Dirk was discovered in 2002.

== See also ==
- Bronze Age Britain
- Hilversum culture
- Atlantic Bronze Age
