= Boyd Knight v Purdue =

- Court: Court of Appeal of New Zealand
- Full case name: Boyd Knight v Purdue
- Decided: 23 March 1999
- Citation: [1999] 2 NZLR 278

Court membership
- Judges sitting: Gault P, Blanchard J, Salmon J

Keywords
- negligence

Boyd Knight v Purdue [1999] 2 NZLR 278 is a cited case in New Zealand regarding liability for negligent misstatements

== Background ==
After losing their investment of $750,000 in Burbery Mortgage Finance & Savings Ltd, the plaintiffs sued the auditors to recover their investment, on the basis that without their audit certificate, that under the Securities Act, there would not have been a prospectus, and so no investment in the first place.

In the High Court, they won their claim, albeit reduced by 50% due to contributory negligence due to the fact that it was a speculative investment in the first place.

The auditors appealed.

== Held ==
The Court of Appeal reversed the High Courts award of damages, on the basis that the plaintiff's had admitted they had not read the advert as a "true and fair view" of the accounts.
