= Hawke's Bay Motor Co Ltd v Russell =

- Court: Court of Appeal of New Zealand
- Full case name: Hawke's Bay Motor Company Limited v Russell
- Citation: [1972] NZLR 542

Court membership
- Judge sitting: Beattie J

Keywords
- negligence

Hawke's Bay Motor Co Ltd v Russell [1972] NZLR 542 is a cited case in New Zealand regarding liability in negligence, and the legal concept of res ipsa loquitur

== Background ==
A bus owned by Hawkes Bay Motor Company was struck on a bend in a road by a car driven on the wrong side of the road by Russell. They later sued Russell for the cost of the damage, to which Russell successfully defended on the basis that he had blacked out due to a medical condition.

HBMC appealed that under res ipsa loquitur, that due to the facts here, the onus of proof should be of Russell to prove the medical condition.

== Held ==
The court ruled that this doctrine did not apply here.
