= Rees v Sinclair =

- Court: Court of Appeal of New Zealand
- Full case name: Rees v Sinclair
- Decided: 3 October 1973
- Citation: [1974] 1 NZLR 180

Court membership
- Judges sitting: McCarthy P, MacArthur J, Beattie J

Keywords
- negligence

Rees v Sinclair [1974] 1 NZLR 180 is a cited case in New Zealand regarding liability for negligence against lawyers. It effectively reinforced the English case of Rondel v Worsley into New Zealand case law.

== Background ==
Ree had Sinclair represent him in a court case. Rather ironically, Ree was a retired lawyer himself. Anyway, Ree believed Sinclair was negligent in handling his case, and sued him for professional negligence.

Sinclair defended the matter by claiming barristerial immunity.
