= Haines House Haulage Co Ltd v Gamble =

- Court: High Court of New Zealand
- Full case name: Haines House Haulage Company Limited v Gamble
- Decided: 1989
- Citation: [1989] 3 NZLR 221

Court membership
- Judge sitting: Barker J

Keywords
- accord and satisfaction

Haines House Haulage Co Ltd v Gamble [1989] 3 NZLR 221 is an often cited case in New Zealand, where a creditor banked a cheque tendered as "full and final settlement" of an account and was later unsuccessful at claiming the balance from the debtor. Its legal significance is that where a creditor banks a debtors cheque for a lesser amount and wants to still claim the balance from the debtor, they must notify the debtor within 10 days that the banked cheque was not accepted as full settlement.

== Background ==
Haines House Haulage sold and moved a house to Matamata on behalf of Gamble. However, when it came time to pay the resulting invoice charged of $2,811.09, Gamble disputed the amount owed. Lengthy correspondence was subsequently exchanged between the two parties culminating in Gamble sending a letter to Haines with a cheque attached for only $672.18, with the letter clearly stating the cheque was being tendered on a full and final basis only, as well as their calculations for this amount tendered.

Haines director received the letter and banked the cheque, but did not accept it as full settlement of the account, and subsequently demanded that Gamble pay the remaining balance of $2,138.91. Haines waited 10 days before they informed Gamble that the cheque was not accepted as full settlement, and the remaining balance was still owed as far as they were concerned.

Gamble of course argued that the banking of the cheque was accord and satisfaction for the account and denied any liability for the remaining balance. Haines ultimately sued Gamble for the balance.

== Held ==
The High Court of New Zealand ruled that as the debtor had not heard from the creditor for 10 days after they banked the cheque, that Gamble were entitled to believe that the cheque had been accepted as full settlement, and so accord and satisfaction applied here.

Barker J said

...it seems that there is some onus on a creditor wishing to escape the consequences of the general rule that an inference is to be drawn from the banking of the cheque in favour of the debtor; the creditor should very promptly indicate its dissent from the basis on which the cheque was sent.

Footnote: In a subsequent case, Hutt City Council v New Zealand Railways Corp (1997) 6 NZBLC 102, 320, the court made a similar decision where the Council banked a similar cheque and took 10 days to notify the debtor of its dissent.
