= Dehn v Attorney-General =

New Zealand court case

- Court: Court of Appeal of New Zealand
- Full case name: Janice Dehn, Harrison & Dehn v Attorney-General
- Decided: 14 April 1989
- Citation: CA180/88 [1989] NZCA 57; [1989] 1 NZLR 320
- Transcript: Court of Appeal judgment

Court membership
- Judges sitting: Cooke J, Richardson J, Somers J

Keywords
- negligence

Dehn v Attorney-General CA180/88 [1989] NZCA 57; [1989] 1 NZLR 320 is a cited case in New Zealand regarding trespass and the implied licence to enter a property.

== Background ==
One night Dehn phoned her sister in Auckland suggesting that their mother and her grandchildren were now dead. Not surprisingly, the sister rang the Police to do a welfare check at their Christchurch residence.

The police soon discovered that the mother was very much still alive. So much so, that she even joined Dehn in taunting the attending police officers with comments such as "Nazi's" and "Gestapo".

They later sued the police for trespass and assault. The court awarded the nominal damages of $1 for the trespass, and nothing for assault, as due to ACC law, damages for assault can only be awarded if the conduct merits exemplary damages.

The Dehn's appealed.

== Held ==
The court confirmed that this case did not merit exemplary damages.
