= Daniels v Thompson =

- Court: Court of Appeal of New Zealand
- Full case name: PAUL JAMES DANIELS Appellant v DEBORAH RITA THOMPSON Respondent
- Decided: 12 February 1998
- Citation: CA86/96 [1998] NZCA 3; [1998] 3 NZLR 22 (12 February 1998)
- Transcript: Court of Appeal judgment

Court membership
- Judges sitting: Woodhouse P, Gault, Henry J, Thomas J, Keith J

Keywords
- negligence

Daniels v Thompson CA86/96 [1998] NZCA 3; [1998] 3 NZLR 22 is a cited case in New Zealand regarding exemplary damages in tort, in order to get around the normal restrictions that ACC legislation place on injury claims.

== Background ==
This case involved 4 victims claiming exemplary damages for sexual abuse they experienced against the offenders, all of which had been earlier prosecuted in court for this offending.

The 4 cases were as follows:

Daniels v Thompson - Upon the breakup of their relationship, Daniels unwisely sued his ex-partner for the return of relationship property, which she lodged a counterclaim for kidnapping and rape, which resulted in him later being charged and convicted for these offences.

J v Bell - J was sexually abused by a female

W v W [1999] 2 NZLR 1 - sued her psychologist for sexual abuse, and although court acquitted the psychologist after an 8-day trial, still faced a civil claim

H v P - H was sexually abused by her father

== Held ==
The Court of Appeal ruled that to face a civil claim that had previously been dealt with in a criminal prosecution, was an "abuse of process", and accordingly the victims civil claims were struck out. J v Bell and W v W subsequently appealed unsuccessfully to the Privy Council. See [1999] UKPC 2

Footnote: As a result of this ruling, the ACT Party managed to get the law changed under section 317 of the Injury Prevention and Rehabilitation Act 2001 to allow such claims in the future.
