= Gulf Corporation Ltd v Gulf Harbour Investments Ltd =

2005 New Zealand contract law case

- Court: Court of Appeal of New Zealand
- Full case name: Gulf Corporation Ltd v Gulf Harbour Investments Ltd
- Decided: 25 May 2005
- Citations: [2005] NZCA 121 (25 May 2005); [2006] 1 NZLR 21; (2005) 6 NZCPR 412
- Transcript: Court of Appeal judgment

Court membership
- Judges sitting: McGrath J, Hammond J, O'Regan J

Gulf Corporation Ltd v Gulf Harbour Investments Ltd [2005] NZCA 121 (25 May 2005); [2006] 1 NZLR 21; (2005) 6 NZCPR 412 is a cited case in New Zealand regarding the termination of conditional contracts.
