= Awa v Independent News Auckland Ltd =

- Court: Court of Appeal of New Zealand
- Full case name: Awa v Independent News Auckland Ltd
- Decided: 31 July 1997
- Citation: [1997] 3 NZLR 590

Court membership
- Judges sitting: Richardson P, Gault J, Thomas J, Keith J, Blanchard J

Keywords
- negligence

Awa v Independent News Auckland Ltd [1997] 3 NZLR 590 is a cited case in New Zealand regarding the defence of fair comment / honest opinion to a claim involving defamation

== Background ==
In the aftermath of the death of comedian Billy T. James, his uncle Awa took his body away from his Pakeha wife, in order to give him a customary Māori burial at his ancestral marae.

Auckland's Sunday News newspaper covered it with a quote referring to Awa as "Billy's 'body snatching' uncle".

Awa subsequently sued for defamation, which the newspaper claimed was "fair comment".

== Held ==
The Court held it was fair comment.
