= Tucker v News Media Ownership Ltd =

High Court of New Zealand case

- Court: High Court of New Zealand
- Full case name: Tucker v News Media Ownership Ltd
- Decided: 7 November 1986
- Citation: CP477/86 [1986] NZHC 216; [1986] 2 NZLR 716
- Transcript: High Court judgment

Court membership
- Judge sitting: McGechan J

Keywords
- negligence

Tucker v News Media Ownership Ltd HC Wellington CP477/86 [1986] NZHC 216; [1986] 2 NZLR 716 is a cited case in New Zealand regarding claims for breach of privacy and infliction of emotional distress
