= Mouat v Clark Boyce =

- Court: Court of Appeal of New Zealand
- Full case name: Dorothy Dean Mouat v Clark Boyce
- Decided: 11 March 1992
- Citation: [1992] 2 NZLR 559
- Transcript: http://www.bailii.org/uk/cases/UKPC/1993/1993_34.pdf

Court membership
- Judges sitting: Cooke P, Richardson and Gault JJ

Mouat v Clark Boyce [1992] 2 NZLR 559 is a cited case in New Zealand regarding the award of damages for breach of contract.

== Background ==
Dorothy Mouat was an elderly 72-year-old widow. Her son Robert Mouat wanted to borrow $100,000 for house alterations and for business expenses, and arranged for his mother to grant a mortgage over her Roydvale Avenue, Christchurch home as security for the loan.

When it came to sign the mortgage documents, Robert's solicitor refused to be party to the transaction, and Robert decided to use the law firm of Clark Boyce, who were also his mother's solicitors.

Clark Boyce informed Mrs Mouat 3 times that she should obtain independent advice, which she declined to do. In the end they got her to sign a form confirming that she refused to seek legal advice, and the mortgage documents were duly signed.

However, 2 years later, Robert defaulted on the loan and was later declared bankrupt.

Dorothy later sued Clark Boyce for negligence.

The outcome of the case pertained that because Clark Boyce had made Mouat aware of the fiduciary obligations, Clark Boyce was not liable for any losses.
