= Gordon Bisson =

The Right Honourable Sir Gordon Bisson
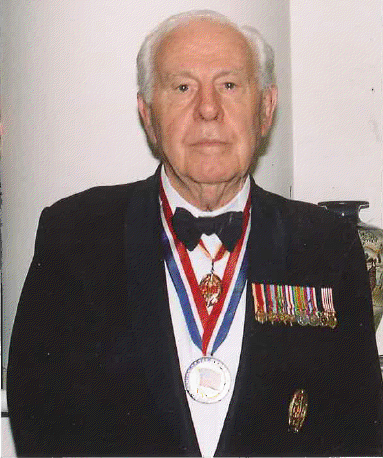

Personal details
- Born: Gordon Ellis Bisson; 23 November 1918 Napier, New Zealand
- Died: 14 November 2010 (aged 91)
- Spouse: Myra Patricia Kemp (m. 1948)

Sir Gordon Ellis Bisson PC (23 November 1918 – 14 November 2010) was a New Zealand Court of Appeal judge and a member of the Privy Council of the United Kingdom.

== Early life and education ==
Bisson was born to Clarence Henry Bisson and Ada Bisson (née Ellis) in 1918 in Napier. Educated at Napier Boys' High School, he graduated from Victoria University College with a Bachelor of Laws in 1941. Bisson served with the RNZNVR during World War II from 1940 to 1945 aboard HMNZS Leander in the Pacific, HMS Warspite at Normandy and the Second Front, and was Mentioned in Despatches. He then served aboard HMS Nelson at sea on the Staff of Admiral Walker Commanding the Third Battle Squadron in the Far East and was promoted to Lieutenant Commander. He was later married in 1948 to Myra Patricia Kemp. The couple went on to have three daughters.

== Legal career ==
Bisson began his legal career with Bisson Moss, the firm established in 1920 by his father. In 1961 he was appointed Crown Solicitor, Napier, and in 1976 was appointed Judge-Courts Martial Appeal Court. Then In 1978 he was appointed a Judge of the Supreme (then High) Court.

In 1986, he was elevated to the Court of Appeal and sat there until he retired at age 72 in 1990. In 1987, he was appointed a Privy Counsellor and he sat on the Board in 1989.

As a retired New Zealand Court of Appeal judge, Bisson served on the Samoan Court of Appeal from 1994 until 2005 for which he was awarded the Companion of the Order of Samoa. He was also a member of the Court of Appeal of Kiribati from 1999 until 2001.

== Honours and awards ==
- 1939 – Sir Michael Myers C.J. Prize in Law
- 1986 – Appointed to the Privy Council
- 1990 – Awarded New Zealand 1990 Commemoration Medal
- 1991 – Appointed a Knight Bachelor in the 1991 New Year Honours
- 2006 – Companion of the Order of Samoa

== Publications ==
Articles

- Papers on Matrimonial Property Law Commonwealth and Empire Law Conference 1960 and N.Z. Law Society Conference 1963
- co-author, Criminal Law and Practice in NZ (1st Edn 1964)
- co-author, Report for International Commission of Jurists on Martial Law in the Philippines (1977).

== Community service ==
- President: Hawke's Bay District Law Society, Hawke's Bay Officers' Club, Hawke's Bay Medico Legal Society, Hawke's Bay Lawn Tennis Club
- Vice President: N.Z. Law Society, N.Z. Section International Commission of Jurists
- Trustee: N.Z. Law Foundation 1982–88
- Chairman: Banking Ombudsman Commission, Meat Export Quota Tribunal
