= High Court of New Zealand =

Superior court of New Zealand

- Te Kōti Matua o Aotearoa (Māori)
- Established: 1841
- Jurisdiction: New Zealand
- Location: Auckland, Wellington, Christchurch and other main centres
- Authorised by: Senior Courts Act 2016
- Appeals to: Court of Appeal
- Appeals from: District Court; Environment Court; Family Court; Youth Court; Various tribunals
- Number of positions: Maximum of 45 full permanent judges plus associate judges
- Website: http://www.courtsofnz.govt.nz/

Chief High Court Judge of New Zealand
- Currently: The Hon Justice Sally Fitzgerald
- Since: 2023

The High Court of New Zealand (Māori: Te Kōti Matua o Aotearoa) is the superior court of general jurisdiction of New Zealand. Rules relating to the jurisdiction of the Court and its Judges are contained in the Senior Courts Act 2016, and its procedure is governed by the High Court Rules 2016, although it also has an inherent jurisdiction. There are 18 High Court locations throughout New Zealand, and one stand-alone registry.

The High Court was established as the "Supreme Court of New Zealand" in 1841. The name was changed in 1980 following the recommendation of the Report of the Royal Commission on the Courts in 1978, which meant that the name "Supreme Court" was available for the Supreme Court of New Zealand which was established in 2004 as the final appellate court for the country.

The High Court is a court of first instance for serious criminal cases such as homicide, civil claims exceeding $350,000, and certain other civil cases. In its appellate function, the High Court hears appeals from the District Court, other lower courts and various tribunals.

== Composition and locations ==
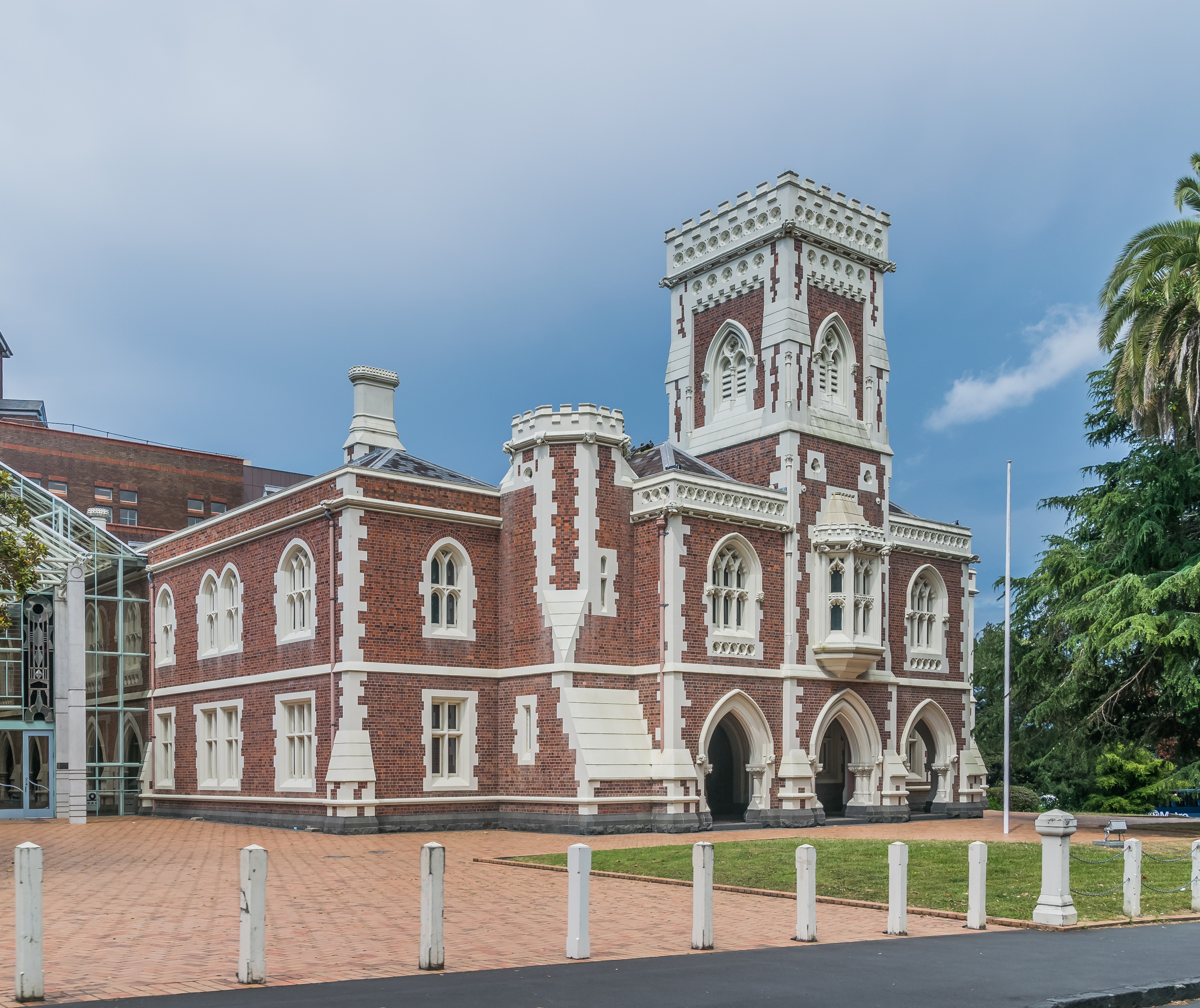
Auckland High Court in 2017

The High Court comprises the Chief Justice (who is head of the judiciary) and up to 60 other permanent Judges (including the Justices of the Supreme Court and the Justices of the Court of Appeal). The administrative head of the court is known as the Chief High Court Judge. Associate Judges of the High Court (called Masters up until May 2004) supervise the Court's preliminary processes in most civil proceedings, and have jurisdiction to deal with summary judgment applications, company liquidations, bankruptcy proceedings, and some other types of civil proceedings.

The High Court Judges and Associate Judges are based in Auckland, Wellington and Christchurch, but also travel on circuit to Whangārei, Hamilton, Rotorua, Tauranga, Gisborne, New Plymouth, Napier, Whanganui, Palmerston North, Nelson, Blenheim, Greymouth, Timaru, Dunedin, and Invercargill. The Court also has a registry in Masterton but does not hear cases there.

== Jurisdiction ==
=== Criminal matters ===
The High Court deals with the most serious types of criminal offences that exceed the District Court's jurisdiction. It deals with all category 4 offences, including murder, manslaughter and treason, as well as any other offence where the accused is likely to be sentenced to life imprisonment or preventive detention. A High Court Judge may direct that a serious category 2 and 3 "protocol" offence, such as aggravated wounding with intent, kidnapping or sexual violation of a child, be transferred from the District Court to the High Court for hearing. Most cases are heard before a Judge and jury, but may sometimes be heard before a Judge alone.

=== Civil matters ===
The Court has exclusive jurisdiction over all civil claims where the amount in dispute exceeds $350,000, and certain categories of proceedings. The categories of proceeding which can only be commenced in the High Court includes matters concerning admiralty, certain applications relating to land (such as seeking its transfer or caveats), company law including liquidations, bankruptcy, the administration of estates and trusts, and trade mark and patent infringement. For civil claims of up to $350,000, the High Court can have co-extensive jurisdiction with the District Court.

=== Appellate function ===
Rights of appeal to the High Court exist against civil and criminal decisions of the District Court (except for jury trials), the Family Court, the Youth Court and the Environment Court and numerous administrative tribunals and regulatory bodies.

== Judges of the High Court ==
Judges of the Supreme Court and the Court of Appeal are also technically Judges of the High Court.

The Senior Courts Act 2016 limits the number of permanent judges of the High Court to 60 FTE excluding the Chief Justice. That figure includes permanent Judges of the Supreme Court (maximum of 5 plus the Chief Justice) and the Court of Appeal (maximum of 10). In practical terms this means a maximum of 45 full time equivalent permanent full High Court judges, an increase of five as a result of the Judicature (Timeliness) Legislation Amendment Act 2025. Prior to the 2025 amendment, the cap on the number of Judges had remained static since 2004.

As with judges of the Supreme Court and the Court of Appeal, High Court judges must retire upon attaining the age of 70 years but are eligible for appointment as an Acting Judge up until the age of 75, provided that the term of acting Judge is no more than two years at a time.

The following are the permanent Judges of the High Court as of September 2026:

Name	Appointed	Resident court	Notes
Sally Fitzgerald	2016	Auckland	Chief High Court Judge (20 December 2023 – present)
Mary Peters	2010	Auckland	
Cameron Mander	2013	Christchurch	
Rachel Dunningham	2014	Christchurch	
Mathew Downs	2016	Auckland	
Pheroze Jagose	2017	Auckland	
Grant Powell	2018	Auckland	
Ian Gault	2018	Auckland	
Tracey Walker	2019	Auckland	
Melanie Harland	2020	Auckland	
Andru Isac KC	2020	Wellington	
Michael Robinson	2021	Auckland	
Jonathan Eaton KC	2021	Christchurch	
Layne Harvey	2021	Auckland	
Kiri Tahana	2022	Auckland	
Helen McQueen	2022	Wellington	
Peter Andrew	2022	Auckland	
Paul Radich KC	2023	Wellington	
Andrew Becroft QSO	2023	Auckland	
Jane Anderson KC	2023	Auckland	
Lisa Preston KC	2023	Christchurch	
Laura O’Gorman KC	2023	Auckland	
Dale La Hood	2023	Wellington	
Karen Grau	2024	Wellington	
Michele Wilkinson-Smith	2024	Auckland	
Jason McHerron	2024	Wellington	
David Boldt	2024	Wellington	
Greg Blanchard KC	2024	Auckland	
Dani Gardiner	2024	Auckland	
Simon Mount KC	2025	Auckland	
James MacGillivray	2025	Auckland	
Owen Paulsen	2025	Christchurch	
Michael Arthur	2025	Auckland	
Amokura Kawharu	2026	Auckland	
Victoria Heine KC	2026	Wellington	
Brett Tantrum	2026	Auckland	
Natalie Walker	2026	Auckland	
Rachel Sussock	2026	Auckland	
Ed Crook	2026	Auckland	

In addition, the following hold current warrants as acting Judges of the High Court as of June 2026:

Name	Resident court	Period of appointment
Christine Gordon KC	Auckland	1 January 2026 to 31 December 2026
Robert Osborne	Christchurch	1 January 2026 to 31 December 2026
Cheryl Gwyn	Wellington	24 August 2026 to 23 August 2027
Peter Churchman	Wellington	21 September 2026 to 30 June 2027
Christine Grice CNZM	Wellington	1 October 2026 to 31 December 2027

== Associate Judges of the High Court ==
Associate Judges have more limited jurisdiction than full High Court judges. They deal with caveats, company liquidations, bankruptcy applications, summary judgment applications, other interlocutory applications, and case management.

Associate Judges are appointed under the Senior Courts Act 2016 and their jurisdiction and related matters are set out in that statute. Unlike full judges, there is no statutory limit on the number of Associate Judges. The Judicial Protocol states that there are up to 9 Associate Judges.

The following are the Associate Judges of the High Court as of September 2026:

Name	Appointed	Resident court	Notes
Kenneth Johnston KC	2018	Wellington	Appointed the Chairperson of the Independent Police Conduct Authority (IPCA) as of 1 May 2023
Dale Lester	2018	Christchurch	
Andrew Skelton	2023	Wellington	
Paul Cogswell	2024	Auckland	
Liz Gellert	2025	Auckland	
Helen Wild	2026	Auckland	
Bill Gambrill	2026	Auckland	
Nick Malarao	2026	Auckland	
Sarah Wroe	2026	Auckland	

In addition, the following holds a current warrant as an acting Associate Judge of the High Court as of June 2026:

Name	Resident court	Period of appointment
Clive Taylor	Auckland	10 March 2026 to 31 December 2026

== Relationship with Australian courts ==
The Trans-Tasman Proceedings Act 2010 (NZ), the Trans-Tasman Proceedings Act 2010 (Aust) and the High Court Rules 2016 streamline the process for resolving civil proceedings with a trans-Tasman element. The Acts cover many matters including service, interim relief, hearing matters remotely and the enforcement of judgments of courts of the other country.

== See also ==
- Supreme Court of New Zealand
- Court of Appeal of New Zealand
- Judicial review in New Zealand, relating to the High Court
- List of cases of the High Court of New Zealand
- Sheriffs of the New Zealand High Court
