= List of New Zealand films =

This is a list of feature films and pre-1910 short films produced or co-produced by New Zealand companies (with some early 1900s exceptions), ordered by the year of release.

== Key ==
- * = Funded in part by the New Zealand Film Commission.
- † = Year given is date of principal photography rather than release.

== Pre 1910 ==
| Title | Director(s) | Genre | Notes |
|---|---|---|---|
1898
| Opening of the Auckland Industrial and Mining Exhibition | Alfred Henry Whitehouse | Documentary | First NZ film; lost |
| Māori Scenes | Joseph Perry | Documentary | First NZ films of Māori; lost |
| Uhlan winning the Auckland Cup at Ellerslie Racecourse † | Alfred Henry Whitehouse | Documentary | First NZ horse-race filmed;lost |
1899
| Regatta scene | Alfred Henry Whitehouse | Documentary | lost |
| Maori Canoe Hurdle Race at Waikato | Alfred Henry Whitehouse | Documentary | lost |
1900
| The Departure of the Second Contingent for the Boer War | Alfred Henry Whitehouse | Documentary | Oldest surviving NZ film |
| The World's First Lady Mayor | Enos Silvanus Pegler | Docu-drama | Re-enactment of 1893 speech |
1901
| Royal Visit of the Duke and Duchess of Cornwall and York to New Zealand | Joseph Perry | Documentary | lost |
| Waimangu Geyser in action | Joseph Perry | Documentary | lost Waimangu Geyser |
| Dummy Mace | Franklyn Barrett | | staged boxing match |
1903
| A Message from Mars | Franklyn Barrett | Drama | First science fiction film made in NZ; lost |
| Ally Sloper as a Conjuror | Franklyn Barrett | Comedy | Harry Hall of Masterton as Ally Sloper |
| Ally Sloper on Holiday | Franklyn Barrett | Comedy | shot at Days Bay |
| Ally Sloper at the Races | Franklyn Barrett | Comedy | filmed at the old Hutt Park racecourse |
1908
| The Sea Coasts of New Zealand | Franklyn Barrett | Documentary | |

== 1910s ==
| Title | Director(s) | Genre | Notes |
|---|---|---|---|
1913
| Hinemoa | Gaston Méliès | | First NZ feature film; lost |
| How Chief Te Ponga Won His Bride | Gaston Méliès | | lost |
| Loved by a Maori Chieftess | Gaston Méliès | | lost |
| The River Wanganui | Gaston Méliès | Documentary | |
1914
| Hinemoa | George Tarr | Romance | First feature film with a NZ producer and director; lost |
1916
| A Maori Maid's Love | Raymond Longford | | lost |
| The Mutiny of the Bounty | Raymond Longford | | lost |
| The Test | Rawdon Blandford | melodrama | lost |

== 1920s ==
| Title | Director | Genre | Notes |
|---|---|---|---|
1921
| Beyond | William Desmond Taylor | Drama | lost |
| The Betrayer | Beaumont Smith | Drama | lost |
| The Bloke from Freeman's Bay | Rudall Hayward | Comedy | Hayward's first film |
1922
| The Birth of New Zealand | Harrington Reynolds | | Earliest New Zealand film of which footage (fragments only) are known to still exist. |
| My Lady of the Cave | Rudall Hayward | | |
| Ten Thousand Miles in the Southern Cross | George Tarr | Documentary/travelogue | |
1923
| The Romance of Sleepy Hollow | Henry J. Makepeace | | lost |
1924
| Rewi's Last Stand | Rudall Hayward | | fragments only remain |
| Venus of the South Seas | James R. Sullivan | | |
1925
| The Adventures of Algy | Beaumont Smith | | |
| Glorious New Zealand | Arthur Messenger | documentary | |
1927
| Carbine's Heritage | Edwin Coubray (Ted) | | lost |
| The Romance of Hine-moa | Gustav Pauli | | lost |
| The Te Kooti Trail | Rudall Hayward | Historical drama | |
| Under the Southern Cross | Gustav Pauli | | lost |
1928
| The Bush Cinderella | Rudall Hayward | | |
1929
| Under the Southern Cross | Lew Collins | | a.k.a. The Devil's Pit or Taranga. Only fragments remain |

== 1930s ==
| Title | Director | Genre | Notes |
|---|---|---|---|
1930
| The Romance Of Maoriland | Edward T. Brown | | Never released. Intended as New Zealand's first feature-length "talkie". 30 minutes of footage only remain. |
1934
| Romantic New Zealand | | travelogue | New Zealand's first released "talkie" film. |
1935
| Down on the Farm | Stewart Pitt | | New Zealand's first non-documentary "talkie". Fragments only remain. First film shot entirely in the South Island. |
| Hei Tiki | Alexander Markey | | a.k.a. Primitive Passions, A Saga of the Maoris. |
| New Zealand's Charm: A Romantic Outpost of Empire | Cyril James Morton | Scenic | |
| Magic Playgrounds in New Zealand's Geyserland | | Scenic | |
1936
| Phar Lap's Son | A. L. Lewis | | a.k.a. Phar Lap's Son?. Lost. |
| On the Friendly Road | Rudall Hayward | drama | Features early New Zealand media personality Colin Scrimgeour in a lead role, playing his radio persona, "Uncle Scrim". |
| The Wagon and the Star | J. J. W. Pollard | drama | Only one reel remains. |
1937
| New Zealand Review no.1, Holiday Sounds | | Scenic | |
1938
| New Zealand Review No.5, Mountain Holiday | | Scenic | |

== 1940s ==
| Title | Director | Genre | Notes |
|---|---|---|---|
1940
| Rewi's Last Stand | Rudall Hayward | Historical drama/War | |
| One Hundred Crowded Years | H H Bridgman | Docu-drama | Official Centennial film |
1941
| Country Lads | Stanhope Andrews | Patriotic propaganda | National Film Unit |

== 1950s ==
| Title | Director | Genre | Notes |
|---|---|---|---|
1950
| 1950 British Empire Games | | Sports documentary | 1950 British Empire Games |
| Journey for Three | Michael Forlong | Immigration propaganda | |
1952
| Broken Barrier | John O'Shea | Drama | |
1954
| Royal New Zealand Journey / A Queen's Royal Tour | Oxley Hughan | Documentary | 1953–1954 royal tour of New Zealand |
| The Seekers | Ken Annakin | Adventure | Location shooting for British film with NZ setting. |

== 1960s ==
| Title | Director | Genre | Notes |
|---|---|---|---|
1964
| 140 Days Under the World | Geoffrey Scott | Documentary | 1965 Academy Award Nominee: Documentary Short. |
| Runaway | John O'Shea | Drama | First film appearance for several noted New Zealand media personalities, including Selwyn Muru, Barry Crump, and Kiri Te Kanawa. |
1966
| Don't Let It Get You | John O'Shea | Comedy | |

== 1970s ==
| Title | Director | Genre | Notes |
|---|---|---|---|
1970
| This is New Zealand | Hugh Macdonald | Documentary | Made for Expo '70 in Osaka, projected over three screens |
1972
| To Love a Maori | Rudall Hayward | | Shot on 16mm. New Zealand's first colour feature film; Hayward's last film. |
1973
| Rangi's Catch | Michael Forlong | Children's drama | Film debut of Temuera Morrison |
1974
| Games '74 | John King, Sam Pillsbury, Paul Maunder, Arthur Everard | Sports documentary | 1974 British Commonwealth Games |
1975
| Landfall † | Paul Maunder | | shot on 16mm |
| Test Pictures: Eleven Vignettes from a Relationship † | Geoff Steven | Drama | |
1976
| Off the Edge † | Michael Firth | Skiing | |
1977
| Sleeping Dogs | Roger Donaldson | Drama/action | First NZ film to open in the U.S. |
| Solo | Tony Williams | | |
| Wild Man | Geoff Murphy | | |
1978
| Angel Mine | David Blyth | Fantasy | Art New Zealand |
| Skin Deep * | Geoff Steven | Drama | |
1979
| Middle Age Spread *† | John Reid | Comedy | shot on 16mm |
| Sons for the Return Home *† | Paul Maunder | Drama | based on the 1973 book by Albert Wendt |

== 1980s ==
| Title | Director | Genre | Notes |
|---|---|---|---|
1980
| Beyond Reasonable Doubt | John Laing | Drama | Based on the true story of the Crewe murders and wrongful conviction of Arthur Allan Thomas |
| Squeeze | Richard Turner | Drama | shot on 16mm |
1981
| Bad Blood * | Mike Newell | drama | NZ-British co-production |
| Dead Kids / Strange Behaviour / Shadowland † | Michael Laughlin | horror | AU-NZ-US co-production |
| Goodbye Pork Pie * | Geoff Murphy | comedy, road movie | |
| Pictures †* | Michael Black | | Entered into the 12th Moscow International Film Festival |
| Race for the Yankee Zephyr | David Hemmings | action | Australia - NZ co-production |
| Smash Palace * | Roger Donaldson | drama | |
| Wildcat † | Ross Prosser, Russel Campbell, Alister Barry | | shot on 16mm |
1982
| Carry Me Back †* | John Reid | comedy | |
| The Scarecrow * | Sam Pillsbury | | |
| Battletruck (reissued as Warlords of the 21st Century) | Harley Cokliss | action | Hollywood film shot on location |
| A Woman of Good Character | David Blyth | Historical drama | AKA Lizzie; shot on 16mm |
1983
| Among the Cinders †* | Rolf Hädrich | Drama | |
| It's Lizzie to Those Close / Lizzie †* | David Blyth | Historical drama | shot on 16mm |
| Merry Christmas, Mr. Lawrence | Nagisa Oshima | War | location shooting for British-Japanese co-production |
| Patu! †* | Merata Mita | documentary | |
| Savage Islands / Nate and Hayes † | Ferdinand Fairfax | Adventure | |
| Second Time Lucky † | Michael Anderson | comedy | |
| Strata † | Geoff Steven | | |
| Trespasses † | Peter Sharp | | |
| Utu * | Geoff Murphy | historical action | Screened at the 1983 Cannes Film Festival |
| Wild Horses †* | Derek Morton | Drama | |
| War Years † | Pat McGuire | | |
1984
| Among the Cinders * | Rolf Hädrich | Drama | New Zealand and West Germany co-production |
| Constance * | Bruce Morrison | Drama | |
| The Bounty | Roger Donaldson | Adventure | Location shooting for Australian/US production |
| Death Warmed Up †* | David Blyth | horror/thriller | |
| Heart of the Stag † | Michael Firth | Drama | |
| Other Halves | John Laing | drama | |
| The Silent One * | Yvonne Mackay | Drama | filmed in the Cook Islands |
| Vigil * | Vincent Ward | Drama | Nominated for Palme D'Or at the 1984 Cannes Film Festival |
| Trial Run * | Melanie Read | Thriller | First NZ feature film to be written and directed by a woman |
1985
| Bridge to Nowhere * | Ian Mune | | |
| Came a Hot Friday * | Ian Mune | comedy | |
| Dangerous Orphans * | John Laing | Action | |
| Hot Target | Denis Lewiston | sex thriller | Location shooting for US film |
| Kingpin | Mike Walker | drama | Entered into the 14th Moscow International Film Festival |
| Leave All Fair | John Reid | Drama | New Zealand and France co-production |
| The Lost Tribe | John Laing | horror | |
| Mr Wrong * | Gaylene Preston | horror | |
| The Quiet Earth * | Geoff Murphy | Drama/sci-fi/mystery | |
| Shaker Run | Bruce Morrison | Action/thriller | |
| Sylvia | Michael Firth | biographical film | |
1986
| Footrot Flats: The Dog's Tale | Murray Ball | animated film | |
| Arriving Tuesday * | Richard Riddiford | romantic comedy | |
| Mark II * | John Anderson | drama | |
| Pallet on the Floor | Lynton Butler | | |
| Queen City Rocker * | Bruce Morrison | | |
1987
| Bad Taste * | Peter Jackson | Comedy/horror/sci-fi | |
| Illustrious Energy * | Leon Narbey | | |
| Mauri * | Merata Mita | | |
| Ngati * | Barry Barclay | | |
1988
| The Grasscutter | Ian Mune | action/thriller | |
| Just Me and Mario | Greg Stitt | Comedy | |
| The Navigator: A Mediaeval Odyssey * | Vincent Ward | fantasy | Entered into the 1988 Cannes Film Festival |
| Never Say Die | Geoff Murphy | action | |
| Send a Gorilla * | Melanie Read | Comedy | |
1989
| A Soldier's Tale | Larry Parr | Romantic drama | |
| Meet the Feebles * | Peter Jackson | black comedy | |
| Zilch! * | Richard Riddiford | thriller | |
| Flying Fox in a Freedom Tree * | Martyn Sanderson | drama | based on works by Albert Wendt |

== 1990s ==
| Title | Director | Genre | Notes |
|---|---|---|---|
1990
| An Angel at My Table * | Jane Campion | biography | |
| Mana Waka | Merata Mita | documentary | |
| Ruby and Rata * | Gaylene Preston | | |
| User Friendly | Gregor Nicholas | horror, comedy | |
| The Returning | John Day | Thriller | |
1991
| The End of the Golden Weather | Ian Mune | | Based on the play The End of the Golden Weather |
| Grampire | David Blyth | comedy/horror/kids | AKA My Grandpa Is a Vampire |
| Old Scores | Alan Clayton | comedy/sport | |
| Te Rua | Barry Barclay | Drama | New Zealand and Germany co-production |
1992
| Alex * | Megan Simpson Huberman | sport /drama | |
| Absent Without Leave | John Laing | World War II | Entered into the 18th Moscow International Film Festival |
| Braindead | Peter Jackson | Splatter/Horror | |
| Chunuk Bair | Dale G. Bradley | War | |
| Crush | Alison Maclean | | Entered into the 1992 Cannes Film Festival |
1993
| Bread and Roses * | Gaylene Preston | biography | |
| Desperate Remedies | Stewart Main, Peter Wells | surrealist melodrama | Screened at the 1993 Cannes Film Festival |
| Jack Be Nimble | Garth Maxwell | gothic horror | |
1994
| Heavenly Creatures * | Peter Jackson | Drama/romance/crime | |
| Once Were Warriors | Lee Tamahori | Drama | |
| The Last Tattoo | John Reid | Drama | |
| Loaded | Anna Campion | Drama | |
1995
| Bonjour Timothy * | | | |
| Cinema of Unease | Sam Neill, Judy Rymer | Documentary | |
| Forgotten Silver | Costa Botes, Peter Jackson | mockumentary | |
| War Stories Our Mothers Never Told Us | Gaylene Preston | Documentary | |
1996
| Broken English | Gregor Nicholas | drama/romance | |
| Chicken | Grant La Hood | comedy | |
| Jack Brown Genius | Tony Hiles | | Produced by Peter Jackson |
| Flight of the Albatross | Werner Meyer | Drama | New Zealand and Germany co-production |
| Someone Else's Country | Alistair Barry | Documentary | |
| The Frighteners * | Peter Jackson | comedy/horror | |
| The Whole of the Moon * | Ian Mune | | |
| Out of the Dark | Keith Hunter | Documentary | |
1997
| Aberration | Tim Boxell | Horror | Starring Pamela Gidley, Simon Bossell |
| Lost Valley | Dale G. Bradley | | |
| Topless Women Talk About Their Lives | Harry Sinclair | | |
| The Ugly | Scott Reynolds | | |
1998
| Memory and Desire | Niki Caro | | |
| Saving Grace | Costa Botes | romance | |
| When Love Comes Along | Garth Maxwell | | |
| Heaven | Scott Reynolds | thriller | |
| Via Satellite | Anthony McCarten | Comedy | |
1999
| Channelling Baby | Christine Parker | | |
| I'll Make You Happy | Athina Tsoulis | | |
| Savage Honeymoon | Mark Beesley | | |
| Scarfies * | Robert Sarkies | black comedy | |
| What Becomes of the Broken Hearted? | Ian Mune | drama | |
| Punitive Damage | Annie Goldson | documentary | |
| Campaign | Tony Sutorius | documentary | |
| Getting to Our Place | Gaylene Preston, Anna Cottrell | documentary | |
| Uncomfortable Comfortable | Campbell Walker | drama | |
| Magik and Rose | Vanessa Alexander | drama, comedy | |
| Lawless | Chris Martin-Jones | action/crime | Starring Kevin Smith, Angela Dotchin. First of a trilogy |

== 2000s ==
| Title | Director | Genre | Notes |
|---|---|---|---|
2000
| The Irrefutable Truth About Demons * | Glenn Standring | Horror, Thriller | |
| Jubilee * | Michael Hurst | Comedy | |
| The Price of Milk * | Harry Sinclair | Comedy | |
| Wild Blue | Dale G. Bradley | drama | |
| Hopeless | Stephen Hickey | comedy | |
| Feathers of Peace | Barry Barclay | drama | |
| Hotere | Merata Mita | documentary | |
2001
| Crooked Earth | Sam Pillsbury | Drama | |
| Kung Fu Vampire Killers | Phil Davison | | |
| Her Majesty | Mark J. Gordon | coming-of-age | |
| The Lord of the Rings: The Fellowship of the Ring | Peter Jackson | fantasy | U.S. & NZ funded film produced in New Zealand |
| Rain | Christine Jeffs | coming-of-age | |
| Snakeskin | Gillian Ashurst | Thriller/road movie | |
| Stickmen | Hamish Rothwell | | |
| Blerta Revisited | Geoff Murphy | documentary | |
2002
| The Lord of the Rings: The Two Towers | Peter Jackson | fantasy | U.S. & NZ funded film produced in New Zealand |
| Whale Rider * | Niki Caro | drama | |
| In a Land of Plenty | Alistair Barry | Documentary | |
| Tongan Ninja | Jason Stutter | Action comedy | |
| Toy Love | Harry Sinclair | comedy | |
| The Maori Merchant of Venice | Don Selwyn | drama | |
| Kids World | Dale G. Bradley | children's film | |
2003
| The Lord of the Rings: The Return of the King | Peter Jackson | fantasy | U.S. & NZ funded film produced in New Zealand |
| The Locals | Greg Page | Supernatural Thriller | |
| Christmas | Greg King | Drama/Comedy | |
| Woodenhead | Florian Habicht | Musical/Fairy tale/Drama | |
| Perfect Strangers | Gaylene Preston | Thriller | |
2004
| Fracture | Larry Parr | Drama | Based on Crime Story by Maurice Gee |
| Murmurs | Elric Kane and Alexander Greenhough | Drama | |
| In My Father's Den | Brad McGann | Drama | |
| Spooked | Geoff Murphy | | |
| Kaikohe Demolition | Florian Habicht | Documentary | |
2005
| 50 Ways of Saying Fabulous | Stewart Main | drama | |
| King Kong | Peter Jackson | adventure | |
| Banana in a Nutshell | Roseanne Liang | Documentary | |
| River Queen | Vincent Ward | historical drama | |
| The World's Fastest Indian * | Roger Donaldson | biography | Based on the life of Burt Munro |
| Meet Me in Miami | Eric Hannah and Iren Koster | Comedy | |
| Memories of Tomorrow | Amit Tripuraneni | Drama/thriller | |
2006
| No. 2 | Toa Fraser | | |
| Perfect Creature | Glenn Standring | horror/thriller | |
| Buddha Wild: Monk in a Hut | Anna Wilding | documentary | |
| Sione's Wedding | Chris Graham | comedy/romance | |
| The Ferryman | Chris Graham | horror | |
| The Waimate Conspiracy | Stefen Harris | Drama | |
| Out of the Blue | Robert Sarkies | drama (based on true events) | Based on the true story of the Aramoana massacre |
| Black Sheep | Jonathan King | Comedy/horror | |
2007
| The Tattooist | Peter Burger | Horror | New Zealand and Singapore co-production |
| A Song of Good | Gregory King | | |
| Down by the Riverside | Marama Killen; Brad Davison | Film noir/horror | |
| The Devil Dared Me To | Chris Stapp | | |
| Kissy Kissy | Elric Kane and Alexander Greenhough | Drama | |
| We're Here To Help | Jonothan Cullinane | Kafkaesque comedy | |
| Men Shouldn't Sing | Sarah Higginson and Michael Bell | Musical | |
| The Last Great Snail Chase | Edward Lynden-Bell | Drama | |
| The Last Magic Show | Andy Conlan | Comedy romance | |
| Pictures of You | | | |
| The Vintner's Luck | Niki Caro | | |
| Show of Hands | Anthony McCarten | Romantic comedy | Filmed in New Plymouth, Nov-Dec 2007 |
| Eagle vs Shark | Taika Waititi | Romantic Comedy | |
2008
| Second Hand Wedding | Paul Murphy | Romantic comedy | |
| Rain of the Children | Vincent Ward | Documentary | |
| Taking the Waewae Express | Andrea Bosshard | Drama | |
| Dean Spanley | Toa Fraser | Drama | |
| BLACKSPOT | Ben Hawker | Thriller | |
| Last of the Living | Logan McMillan | Comedy horror | |
| Rubbings from a Live Man | Florian Habicht | Drama documentary | |
| The Art Star and the Sudanese Twins | Pietra Brettkelly | Documentary | |
2009
| District 9 | Neill Blomkamp | Science fiction action | |
| The Lovely Bones | Peter Jackson | | |
| Under the Mountain | Jonathan King | Fantasy | Based on the children's book of the same name by Maurice Gee which was also adapted into a television miniseries |
| Jumping in Puddles | Nick Hitchens and Jonathan Warner | Documentary | |
| The Strength of Water | Armağan Ballantyne | Drama | |
| Separation City | Paul Middleditch | | |
| The Man in the Hat | Luit Bieringa | Documentary | |
| The Topp Twins: Untouchable Girls | Leanne Pooley | Documentary | |
| Land of the Long White Cloud | Florian Habicht | Documentary | |

== 2010s ==
| Title | Director | Genre | Notes |
|---|---|---|---|
2010
| Kawa | Katie Wolfe | Drama | Based on Nights in the Gardens of Spain by Witi Ihimaera |
| After the Waterfall | Simone Horrocks | Drama | |
| Wound | David Blyth | Horror | |
| Matariki | Michael Bennett | Drama | |
| Boy | Taika Waititi | Comedy/drama | |
| Predicament | Jason Stutter | Comedy | Based on the Ronald Hugh Morrieson novel |
| The Insatiable Moon | Rosemary Riddell | Comedy/drama | |
| The Hopes & Dreams of Gazza Snell | Brendan Donovan | Comedy/family | |
| Home by Christmas | Gaylene Preston | Documentary Drama | |
| Russian Snark | Stephen Sinclair | Comedy | |
2011
| The Devil's Rock | Paul Campion | Horror | |
| The Holy Roller | Patrick Gillies | Comedy drama | |
| Love Birds | Paul Murphy | Romantic comedy | |
| My Wedding and Other Secrets | Roseanne Liang | | |
| The Adventures of Tintin: Secret of the Unicorn | Steven Spielberg | Family/adventure | |
| Operation 8: Deep in the Forest | Errol Wright and Abi King-Jones | Documentary | |
| The Most Fun You Can Have Dying | Kirstin Marcon | | |
| Dreamer by Design | David Chan | Comedy/drama | |
| Tracker | Ian Sharp | Action/Thriller | |
| Love Story | Florian Habicht | Documentary drama | |
| When a City Falls | Gerard Smyth | Documentary | |
2012
| Sione's 2: Unfinished Business | Simon Bennett | Comedy | Sequel to the Sione's Wedding (2006) |
| Good for Nothing | Mike Wallis | Comedy/Thriller/Western | |
| Ghost TV | Phil Davison | | |
| Mr. Pip | Andrew Adamson | Drama | Based on Lloyd Jones' novel Mister Pip |
| The Hobbit: An Unexpected Journey | Peter Jackson | Fantasy | U.S. & NZ funded film produced in New Zealand |
| Tongan Ark | Paul Janman | Documentary | NZ Screen Innovation Fund www.publicfilms.works |
| The Red House | Alyx Duncan | Drama | |
| Kiwi Flyer | Tony Simpson | Family/Comedy | |
| Two Little Boys | Robert Sarkies | Comedy | |
2013
| White Lies | Dana Rotberg | Drama | |
| Eternity | Alex Galvin | Drama/sci-fi/mystery | |
| Shopping | Mark Albiston, Louis Sutherland | Drama | |
| The Hobbit: The Desolation of Smaug | Peter Jackson | Fantasy | U.S. & NZ funded film produced in New Zealand |
| Romeo & Juliet: A Love Song | Tim van Dammen | Rock opera | Based on William Shakespeare's tragedy Romeo & Juliet |
| Gardening with Soul | Jess Feast | Documentary | |
| The Weight of Elephants | Daniel Joseph Borgman | Drama | |
| Giselle | Toa Fraser | Documentary | |
| Fantail | Curtis Vowell | Drama | |
| He Toki Huna: New Zealand in Afghanistan | Kay Ellmers | Documentary | |
| Sheen of Gold | Simon Ogston | Documentary | |
| Us and the Game Industry | Stephanie Beth | Documentary | |
| Edwin: My Life as a Koont | Jason Stutter | Mockumentary, Comedy | |
| Ghost Bride | David Blyth | Horror, Romance | |
| Crackheads | Andy Sophocleus, Tim Tsiklauri | Comedy | |
2014
| Syrenia | Fraser Grut | Fantasy/family | |
| What We Do in the Shadows | Taika Waititi, Jemaine Clement | Comedy/horror | |
| Housebound | Morgana O'Reilly, Cameron Rhodes | Comedy/horror | |
| The Pā Boys | Himiona Grace | Music/drama | |
| The Dark Horse | James Napier Robertson | Drama | Biopic based on the true story of chess player Genesis Potini |
| The Dead Lands | Toa Fraser | Action/horror | It was premièred in the Special Presentations section at the 2014 Toronto International Film Festival |
| Hip Hop-eration | Bryn Evans | Documentary | |
| The Hobbit: The Battle of the Five Armies | Peter Jackson | Fantasy | U.S. & NZ funded film produced in New Zealand |
| Tūmanako/Hope | Susy Pointon | Documentary | |
| 3 Mile Limit | Craig Newland | Drama | |
| Urban Turban | Devesh Singh | Drama, Romance | Fiji/NZ Bollywood film |
| The Cure | David Gould | Action thriller | |
| Jake | Doug Dillaman | Drama, Sci-fi, Comedy | |
| Everything We Loved | Max Currie | Drama | |
| Contract Killers | Mathew John Pearson | Action Thriller | |
| Beyond the Edge | Leanne Pooley | Documentary | |
| Orphans and Kingdoms | Paolo Rotondo | Drama | |
| Aunty and the Star People | Gerard Smyth | Documentary | |
| Erewhon | Gavin Hipkins | Essay | |
| Hot Air | Alister Barry, Abi King-Jones | Documentary | |
| REALITi | Jonathan King | Thriller, Sci-Fi | |
| Voices of the Land: Nga Reo o te Whenua | Paul Wolffram | Documentary | |
| Cap Bocage | Jim Marbrook | Documentary | |
| The Inheritance | Jeff McDonald | Documentary | |
| Into the Void | Margaret Gordon | Documentary | |
2015
| Deathgasm | Jason Lei Howden | Comedy/horror | |
| The Dead Room | Jason Stutter | Horror | |
| Turbo Kid | François Simard, Anouk Whissell and Yoann-Karl Whissell | Action/adventure/comedy/superhero/post-apocalyptic | |
| 25 April | Leanne Pooley | Documentary | |
| Ghost Shark 2: Urban Jaws | Andrew Todd, Johnny Hall | Comedy/horror | |
| Born To Dance | Tammy Davis | Action/sport | |
| Belief: The Possession of Janet Moses | David Stubbs | Docodrama | |
| Slow West | John McLean | Action/adventure, Drama | |
| Lexi | Wayne Turner | Drama | |
| The Great Maiden's Blush | Andrea Bosshard, Shane Loader | Drama | |
| A Flickering Truth | Pietra Brettkelly | | |
| Herbs: Songs of Freedom | Tearepa Kahi | documentary | |
| Free in Deed | Jake Mahaffy | drama | |
| Act of Kindness | Costa Botes | Documentary | |
| The Art of Recovery | Peter Young | Documentary | |
| Crossing Rachmaninoff | Rebecca Tansley | Documentary | |
| Ever the Land | Sarah Groenert | Documentary | |
| Philip Dadson: Sonics From Scratch | Simon Ogston, Orlando Stewart | Documentary | |
| The Price of Peace | Kim Webby | Documentary | |
| Return of the Free China Junk | Robin Greenberg | Documentary | |
| Tom Who? The Enigma of Tom Kreisler | Shirley Horrocks | Documentary | |
2016
| Mahana | Lee Tamahori | Action/drama | Based on the novel Bulibasha by Witi Ihimaera |
| Penny Black | Joe Hitchcock | Road Movie | |
| Orphans and Kingdoms | Paolo Rotondo | Drama | |
| notes to eternity | Sarah Cordery | Documentary | featuring Noam Chomsky, Robert Fisk, Norman Finkelstein, Sara Roy |
| Hunt for the Wilderpeople | Taika Waititi | Comedy | Based on the novel Wild Pork and Watercress by Barry Crump |
| Tickled | David Farrier, Dylan Reeve | Documentary | |
| Chasing Great | Justin Pemberton, Michelle Walsh | Documentary | |
| the heART of the matter | Luit Bieringa | Documentary | |
| Poi E: The Story of Our Song | Tearepa Kahi | documentary | |
| The Rehearsal | Alison Maclean | Drama | |
| On an Unknown Beach | Adam Luxton, Summer Agnew | Documentary | |
| West of Eden | Alastair Riddell | Drama | |
| The 5th Eye | Errol Wright, Abi King-Jones | Documentary | |
| Chronesthesia | Hayden J. Weal | Romantic comedy | |
| This Giant Papier Mâché Boulder Is Actually Really Heavy | Christian Nicolson | Science fiction, Comedy | |
| Apple Pie | Sam Hamilton | Documentary | |
| Le Ride | Phil Keoghan | documentary | |
2017
| Pork Pie | Matt Murphy | Comedy/Road Movie | Remake of Goodbye Pork Pie |
| Kiwi Christmas | Tony Simpson | Family | |
| Waru | Briar Grace-Smith, Casey Kaa, Ainsley Gardiner, Katie Wolfe, Chelsea Cohen, Renae Maihi, Paula Whetu Jones, Awanui Simich-Pene | Drama | |
| 6 Days | Toa Fraser | Drama/Thriller | |
| The Changeover | Miranda Harcourt, Stuart McKenzie | Fantasy/Thriller | Based on the novel The Changeover by Margaret Mahy |
| Human Traces | Nic Gorman | Drama/Thriller | |
| The Wizard & the Commodore - Chathams Islands New Zealand | Samuel A. Miller | Mondo Documentary | |
| Bill Direen, A Memory of Others | Simon Ogston | Documentary | Screened in NZIFF 2017, download with O.S.T. 2019 |
| My Year With Helen | Gaylene Preston | Documentary | |
| What Lies That Way | Paul Wolffram | Documentary | |
| Spookers | Florian Habicht | Documentary | |
| The Stolen | Niall Johnson | Western | |
| Kim Dotcom: Caught in the Web | Annie Goldson | Documentary | |
| Pecking Order | Slavko Martinov | Documentary | |
2018
| The Breaker Upperers | Madeleine Sami, Jackie van Beek | Comedy | |
| Blue Moon | Stefen Harris | Film Noir | |
| Broken | Tarry Mortlock | Drama | Inspired by true events |
| Mortal Engines | Christian Rivers | Fantasy/Thriller | Filmed in NZ, a U.S./NZ co-production based on the novel Mortal Engines by Philip Reeve |
| Mega Time Squad | Tim van Dammen | Sci-fi, Action, Comedy | |
| Status Pending | Ben Zolno | Dramedy | Improvised dialogue (mumblecore) film premiering at Cinequest, Filmed Entirely in Wellington, NZ. |
| The Heart Dances - The Journey of The Piano: The Ballet | Rebecca Tansley | Documentary | |
| Yellow Is Forbidden | Pietra Brettkelly | Documentary | |
2019
| Daffodils | David Stubbs | Drama | |
| For My Father's Kingdom | Vea Mafile'o, Jeremiah Tauamiti | Documentary | |
| Bellbird | Hamish Bennett | Drama | |
| Come to Daddy | Ant Timpson | Horror | |
| Brown Boys | Hans Masoe | Comedy | |
| Take Home Pay | Stallone Vaiaoga-Ioasa | Comedy | |
| Capital in the Twenty-First Century | Justin Pemberton | Documentary | |
| Savage | Sam Kelly | crime | |
| Jojo Rabbit | Taika Waititi | Comedy drama | |
| Killer Sofa | Bernie Rao | Comedy horror | |
| Vai | Nicole Whippy Ofa-Ki-Levuka Guttenbeil-Likiliki Matasila Freshwater Amberley Jo Aumua Mīria George Marina Alofagia McCartney Dianna Fuemana Becs Arahanga | Drama | |
| The Chills: The Triumph & Tragedy of Martin Phillipps | Julia Parnell Rob Curry | Documentary | |
| Mosley | Kirby Atkins | animated fantasy adventure drama | |
| Guns Akimbo | Jason Lei Howden | Action comedy | |

== 2020s ==
| Title | Director | Genre | Notes |
|---|---|---|---|
2020
| The Legend of Baron To'a | Kiel McNaughton | drama | |
| Balance of the Five Elements | Jan-Hinrik Drevs | documentary | |
| The Girl on the Bridge | Leanne Pooley | documentary | |
| Rūrangi | Max Currie | LGBT/drama | |
| LOIMATA, The Sweetest Tears | Anna Marbrook | documentary | |
| This Town | David White | comedy | |
| Lowdown Dirty Criminals | Paul Murphy | comedy | |
| Shadow in the Cloud | Roseanne Liang | action/horror | |
| Reunion | Jake Mahaffy | thriller, horror | |
| Baby Done | Curtis Vowell | comedy | |
| Six60: Till the Lights Go Out | Julia Parnell | documentary | |
| We Need to Talk about A.I. | Leanne Pooley | documentary | |
2021
| Dawn Raid | Oscar Kightley | documentary | |
| Coming Home in the Dark | James Ashcroft | thriller | |
| There Is No "I" in Threesome | Jan Oliver Lucks | drama, documentary, comedy | |
| Cousins | Ainsley Gardiner, Briar Grace-Smith | drama | Based on Patricia Grace's eponymous novel. |
| Night Raiders | Danis Goulet | drama | |
| James & Isey | Florian Habicht | documentary | |
| Poppy | Linda Niccol | drama | |
| The Justice of Bunny King | Gaysorn Thavat | drama | |
| Juniper | Matthew J. Saville | drama | |
| Mothers of the Revolution | Briar March | documentary | |
| The Power of the Dog | Jane Campion | drama | Nominated for Best Picture at the 94th Academy Awards |
| Millie Lies Low | Michelle Savill | drama, comedy | |
| Fiona Clark: Unafraid | Lula Cucchiara | documentary | Documentary on photographer Fiona Clark |
| Whetū Mārama – Bright Star | Toby Mills, Aileen O'Sullivan | documentary | |
| Signed, Theo Schoon | Luit Bieringa | documentary | |
| Ayukawa: The Weight of a Life | Tu Rapana Neill, Jim Speers | documentary | |
| Mark Hunt - The Fight of His Life | Peter Brook Bell | documentary | |
| A Mild Touch of Cancer | Annie Goldson | documentary | |
| MILKED | Amy Taylor | documentary | |
| Rohe Kōreporepo – The Swamp, the Sacred Place | Kathleen Gallagher, Kate Goodwin | documentary | |
2022
| We Are Still Here | Beck Cole, Chantelle Burgoyne, Dena Curtis, Richard Curtis, Mario Gaoa, Danielle MacLean, Miki Magasiva, Renae Maihi, Tracey Rigney, Tim Worrall | drama | |
| Nude Tuesday | Armağan Ballantyne | comedy | |
| Whina | James Napier Robertson, Paula Whetu Jones | biographical drama | |
| Muru | Tearepa Kahi | action, drama | |
| Kāinga | Julie Zhu, Asuka Sylvie, Michelle Ang, Nahyeon Lee, Yamin Tun, Ghazaleh Golbakhsh, HASH, Angeline Loo | drama | Anthology film |
| Punch | Welby Ings | drama | |
| Gloriavale | Fergus Grady, Noel Smyth | documentary | Documentary on the Gloriavale Christian Community |
| A Boy Called Piano | Nina Nawalowalo | drama documentary | |
| When the Cows Come Home | Costa Botes | documentary | |
| Mister Organ | David Farrier | documentary | |
| Dame Valerie Adams: More than Gold | Briar March | documentary | Documentary on Valerie Adams |
| We Came Here For Freedom Part I | Alistair Harding | documentary | |
| Geoff Dixon: Portraits of Us | Glenis Giles, Claire O'Leary | documentary | |
| Juliet Gerrard: Science in Dark Times | Shirley Horrocks | documentary | |
| Ka Pō | Etienne Aurelius | drama | |
| Shut Eye | Tom Levesque | drama | |
2023
| Bad Behaviour | Alice Englert | comedy | |
| Red, White & Brass | Damon Fepulea'i | comedy | |
| Stylebender | Zoe McIntosh | documentary | Documentary on Israel Adesanya |
| We Came Here For Freedom Part II | Alistair Harding | documentary | |
| River of Freedom | Gaylene Barnes | documentary | |
| Uproar | Hamish Bennett, Paul Middleditch | drama | |
| The Convert | Lee Tamahori | drama | |
| Joika | James Napier Robertson | drama | |
| Billion Dollar Heist | Daniel Gordon | documentary | |
| Building Bridges: Bill Youren's Vision of Peace | John Christoffels | documentary | |
| Grant Sheehan: Light, Ghosts & Dreams | Robin Greenberg | documentary | |
| Home Kills | Haydn Butler | | |
| King Loser | Cushla Dillon, Andrew Moore | documentary | |
| Loop Track | Tom Sainsbury | comedy horror | |
| Ms. Information | Gwen Isaac | documentary | |
| Red Mole: A Romance | Annie Goldson | documentary | |
| The Strangest of Angels | Rebecca Tansley | documentary | |
2024
| We Were Dangerous | Josephine Stewart-Te Whiu | drama | |
| The Mountain | Rachel House | comedy drama | |
| The Lie | Helena Coan | documentary | |
| The Moon Is Upside Down | Loren Taylor | comedy | |
| Ka Whawhai Tonu | Michael Jonathan | war drama | |
| Bookworm | Ant Timpson | comedy drama | |
| Went Up the Hill | Samuel Van Grinsven | thriller, horror, drama | |
| Alien Weaponry: Kua Tupu Te Ara | Kent Belcher | documentary | |
| Grafted | Sasha Rainbow | horror | |
| The Haka Party Incident | Katie Wolfe | documentary | |
| Head South | Jonathan Ogilvie | coming-of-age, drama | |
| The House Within | Joshua Prendeville | documentary | |
| Marimari | Paul Wolffram | documentary | |
| A Mistake | Christine Jeffs | drama | |
| Never Look Away | Lucy Lawless | documentary | |
| Taki Rua Theatre - Breaking Barriers | Whetu Fala | documentary | |
| Maurice & I | Rick Harvie, Jane Mahoney | documentary | |
| The Rule of Jenny Pen | James Ashcroft | thriller | |
| The Bostrom Scenario | Ricky Townsend | sci-fi, thriller | |
| Tinā | Miki Magasiva | drama | |
| Gut Instinct | Doug Dillaman | Science fiction | |
| The Weed Eaters | Callum Devlin | Comedy, Horror | |
2025
| Forgive Us All | Jordana Stott and Lance Giles | apocalyptic horror | |
| Marlon Williams: Ngā Ao E Rua Two Worlds | Ursula Grace Williams | Documentary | |
| The People We Love | Mike Smith | Drama, Romance | |
| Project Fiftyone | Gaylene Barnes, Bariz Shah, Saba Afrasyabi | Documentary | |
| Kōkā | Kath Akuhata-Brown | Drama | |
| Pike River | Robert Sarkies | Drama | |
| Workmates | Curtis Vowell | Drama, Comedy | |
| Prime Minister | Mishelle Walshe, Lindsay Utz | Documentary | |
| GRACE A Prayer for Peace | Gaylene Preston | Documentary | |
| Life in One Chord | Margaret Gordon | Documentary | |
| TOITŪ Visual Sovereignty | Chelsea Winstanley | Documentary | |
| Anchor Me - The Don McGlashan Story | Shirley Horrocks | Documentary | |
| Kaikohe Blood & Fire | Simon Ogston | Documentary | |
| Notes from a Fish | Tom Levesque, Romy Hooper | Comedy | |
| Mārama | Taratoa Stappard | Gothic horror | |
| No Tears on the Field | Lisa Burd | Documentary | |
| Moss & Freud | James Lucas | Biographical drama | |
| The Tavern | Brad Jackson | Comedy | |
2026
| Mum, I'm Alien Pregnant | THUNDERLIPS | Comedy horror | |
| Big Girls Don't Cry | Paloma Schneideman | Drama | |
| Holy Days | Nathalie Boltt | Comedy drama | |
| Caterpillar | Chelsie Preston Crayford | Drama | |
| Tenor: My Name is Pati | Rebecca Tansley | Documentary | |
| Sgt. Haane | Tearepa Kahi | Documentary | |
| Crocodile | Pietra Brettkelly | Documentary | |
| Lomu | Vea Mafile'o, Gavin Fitzgerald | Documentary | |
| Sukundimi Walks Before Me | Matasila Freshwater | Documentary | |
| 1978 | Isaac Lee, April Phillips | drama | |

== See also ==
- Cinema of New Zealand
