= Cinema of Unease: A Personal Journey by Sam Neill =

- Directed by: Sam Neill; Judy Rymer
- Written by: Sam Neill
- Produced by: Paula Jalfon; Grant Campbell; Vincent Burke
- Starring: Sam Neill
- Cinematography: Alun Bollinger
- Edited by: Michael Horton
- Music by: Don McGlashan; The Mutton Birds; John McNicholas; Ross Chambers; Mike Hedges
- Production company: Top Shelf Productions (New Zealand)
- Distributed by: Top Shelf Productions (New Zealand)
- Release date: July 1995
- Running time: 56 minutes
- Country: New Zealand
- Language: English
- Budget: NZ$466,000

Cinema of Unease: A Personal Journey by Sam Neill is a documentary about the history of New Zealand cinema written by Sam Neill and co-directed by Neill and Judy Rymer. The film was released in 1995, and was New Zealand's contribution to the British Film Institute's Century of Cinema series. The title refers to the dark and brooding nature of many of New Zealand's most notable films, which Neill considers a reflection of the nation's struggle to find, or form, its own identity. The film screened in the 1995 Cannes Film Festival, and won Best Documentary in the 1996 TV Guide Film and Television Awards of New Zealand.

== Filmography ==
The following films are featured and discussed in the documentary:

- The Te Kooti Trail (1927)
- One Hundred Crowded Years (1940)
- Country Lads (1941)
- Journey for Three (1950)
- Broken Barrier (1952)
- Reach for the Sky (1956)
- The Roy Rogers Show (1956)
- Runaway (1964)
- Wayleggo (1965)
- Don't Let It Get You (1966)
- The Soldierboys (1967)
- This is New Zealand (1970)
- The Sealhunters (1973)
- Sleeping Dogs (1977)
- Beyond Reasonable Doubt (1980)
- Bad Blood (1981)
- Goodbye Pork Pie (1981)
- Carry Me Back (1982)
- The Scarecrow (1982)
- Smash Palace (1982)
- Patu! (1983)
- Utu (1983)
- Vigil (1984)
- Came a Hot Friday (1985)
- The Lost Tribe (1985)
- The Quiet Earth (1986)
- Bad Taste (1987)
- The Navigator (1988)
- An Angel at My Table (1990)
- Braindead (1992)
- Bread and Roses (1993)
- Desperate Remedies (1993)
- The Piano (1993)
- Jack Be Nimble (1994)
- Heavenly Creatures (1994)
- Once Were Warriors (1994)
- The Last Tattoo (1994)
