= The Departure of the Second Contingent for the Boer War =

- Based on: Documentary
- Cinematography: W. H. Bartlett
- Distributed by: Alfred Henry Whitehouse
- Release date: 1900
- Running time: 1 min 14 sec
- Country: New Zealand
- Language: Silent

External videos
- The Departure of the Second Contingent for the Boer War (The NZ Archive of Film)

The Departure of the Second Contingent for the Boer War is a 1900 New Zealand documentary silent film.

This is the oldest surviving New Zealand film and was produced by Alfred Henry Whitehouse.

The earliest New Zealand films being from the first of December 1898, the opening of the Auckland Industrial and Mining Exhibition, and Boxing Day that year, Uhlan winning the Auckland Cup at Ellerslie Racecourse.
