= Hamish Bennett =

Hamish Bennett may refer to:

- Hamish Bennett (director) (born 1978), New Zealand filmmaker
- Hamish Bennett (cricketer) (born 1987), New Zealand cricketer
