= Wayleggo =

Short New Zealand colour film

- Directed by: Bob Kingsbury
- Written by: Bob Kingsbury
- Based on: Peter Newton’s 1947 memoir, Wayleggo
- Produced by: Oxley Hughan; Geoffrey Scott
- Narrated by: Murray Wood
- Cinematography: Brian Latham
- Edited by: Kenneth Rolls
- Music by: Oswald Cheesman
- Production company: National Film Unit
- Distributed by: NZ Film Archives
- Release date: 1965
- Running time: 23 minutes
- Country: New Zealand
- Language: English

Wayleggo is a 1965 New Zealand short film. It was produced by the National Film Unit. The film was based on the 1947 musterer memoir Wayleggo written by Peter Newton.

== Synopsis ==
Showing the working life of a young musterer on a 145,000 acre South Island merino sheep station. Beginning in the summer with dog training and horse breaking, then the autumn mustering of 10,000 sheep from the tops, across rivers and down to the yards before winter snows.

== Production ==
This was a short colour film production released by the National Film Unit.

== Reviews ==
- 1965 The Press -“Wayleggo,” A High Country Film.
- 1966 The Press - High-country film coming.
- 1966 The Press - Melbourne Prize High Country Documentary.
- 1995 featured in New Zealand's contribution to the British Film Institute's Century of Cinema series - Cinema of Unease: A Personal Journey by Sam Neill.
