= A Soldier's Tale =

1988 film

- VHS cover
- Directed by: Larry Parr
- Written by: Grant Hindin-Miller; M.K. Joseph; Larry Parr
- Produced by: Larry Parr
- Starring: Gabriel Byrne; Marianne Basler
- Cinematography: Alun Bollinger
- Edited by: Michael Horton
- Music by: John Charles
- Distributed by: Atlantic Releasing Corporation
- Release date: 16 June 1988
- Country: New Zealand
- Language: English

A Soldier's Tale is a 1988 New Zealand romantic war film directed and produced by Larry Parr and starring Gabriel Byrne and Marianne Basler. It is based on a novel by M. K. Joseph. Originally intended as a French - New Zealand co-production but the French pulled out. The film experienced further setbacks when their American distributor went bankrupt, disrupting the films release.

== Cast ==
- Gabriel Byrne as Saul
- Marianne Basler as Bell
- Paul Wyett as Charlie
- Judge Reinhold as The Yank
- Benoît Régent as Father Superior
- Maurice Garrel as M. Pradier
- Jacques Mathou as Woulf
- Bernard Farcy as André

== Release ==
It was released to home video in the United States in 1992.

== Reception ==
Helen Martin in New Zealand film, 1912-1996 wrote "The narrative balances the harshness of war with the tenderness of the emerging love affair. Saul, unused to expressing his feelings and through his upbringing a prude in sexual matters, learns about love in his few days with Belle." David Stratton reviewed the film for Variety at Canne in 1988 and said "Not a war story, as the title might imply, this is a touching wartime love story set in Normandy in 1944. Thanks to a lovely central performance from Marianne Basler as a lonely French girl who falls in love with a British sergeant (Gabriel Byrne), the film could have theatrical potential, and certainly will have a long residual life." He notes "Director Larry Parr handles all this with delicacy and feeling, though his pacing is on the slow side." William Dart from Rip It Up noted "A Soldier's Tale strives for a seriousness and a significance that it doesn't deliver."

TV Guide reviewed the film, writing that " An interesting but slight character study, A SOLDIER'S TALE highlights the corrupt morality of wartime." A reviewer for The Missoulian was dismissive, as they felt that it was "a talky bore". John Koch of The Boston Globe called it "well-made, tough-minded and memorable".

== Awards ==
New Zealand Film Awards 1992

- Best Performance, female - Marion Basler - won
- Best Contribution to a soundtrack - John McKay - won
