= War Stories Our Mothers Never Told Us =

1995 New Zealand documentary film

- Directed by: Gaylene Preston
- Written by: Gaylene Preston
- Produced by: Gaylene Preston
- Cinematography: Alun Bollinger
- Edited by: Paul Sutorius
- Music by: Jonathan Besser
- Production company: Gaylene Preston Productions
- Release date: 1995
- Running time: 95 minutes
- Country: New Zealand
- Language: English

War Stories Our Mothers Never Told Us is a 1995 New Zealand documentary film directed by Gaylene Preston.

== Synopsis ==
Seven New Zealand women talk about their lives during World War II with archive film footage.

== Recognition ==
- 1995 Sydney Film Festival Best Documentary, Most Popular Film
