= Park Road Post =

Post-production facility for multimedia projects

Park Road Post Production Limited
- Industry: Film post-production
- Headquarters: Miramar, Wellington, New Zealand
- Owner: WingNut Films

The Park Road Post building

Park Road Post Production is an international film and television post-production facility located in Miramar, a suburb of Wellington, New Zealand. Built out of the state-owned National Film Unit (NFU), the new facility opened upon completion in 2005. Park Road is owned by WingNut Films, the production company of Sir Peter Jackson. Its premises cover some 10,200 m^{2} (110,000 ft^{2}).

Post production services offered at Park Road cover full sound, picture and VFX services for feature films, television and digital and film restoration. Full details can be found on the facility's website.

Although the facility was incomplete at the time, the final sound mix for The Lord of the Rings: The Return of the King (2003) took place there. King Kong (2005) was subsequently mixed at the facility; both films won an Academy Award for Best Sound Mixing.

Park Road carried out the restoration of the documentaries This is New Zealand (1970) for the 2007 New Zealand International Film Festival, They Shall Not Grow Old (2018), The Beatles: Get Back (2021), and Beatles '64 (2024).

In June 2013, Park Road closed down its film processing laboratory, citing the shift to digital capture. A downsize of the lab facilities were relocated and installed at Archives New Zealand.
