= The Quiet Earth =

1981 novel by Craig Harrison

- First edition
- Author: Craig Harrison
- Language: English
- Publisher: Hodder & Stoughton
- Publication date: 1981
- Publication place: New Zealand
- ISBN: 0-340-26507-8
- OCLC: 15561928

The Quiet Earth is a 1981 science fiction novel by New Zealand writer Craig Harrison. The novel was adapted into a 1985 New Zealand science fiction film of the same name directed by Geoff Murphy.

The 2013 Penguin edition includes an introduction by Bernard Beckett.

== Plot summary ==
John Hobson, a geneticist working on a project involving the manipulation of DNA, awakens in a Thames, New Zealand hotel after a nightmare in which he is falling. His wristwatch has stopped at 6:12, as have all other clocks. He discovers that all humans, animals and fauna have abruptly disappeared following a phenomenon he calls "the Effect".

Hobson travels to his research unit, where he had worked on reactivating dormant genes in humans and animals using high-frequency sound waves and radiation. There he finds his supervisor, Perrin, dead inside a radiation chamber at the controls of the sound-wave machine. The machine appears to have short-circuited, but the cause of Perrin's death is unclear. Hobson takes a box containing Perrin's papers and heads for Wellington in search of survivors or clues. Near Rotorua, he sees what appears to be a dog-calf hybrid in his headlights, but drives away, unsure whether it was real.

After failing to find anyone, Hobson nearly commits suicide. Discovering living fish in a stream, he concludes that the Effect did not penetrate water. He later hears a noise across Lake Taupō and follows it, only to encounter a roadblock and a gunman. The man is Apirana Maketu, a Māori soldier in the New Zealand Army, known as "Api". Api awoke at his deserted barracks in Waiouru and set out to find survivors. Having heard the same noise, he constructed the roadblock to intercept anyone travelling south.

Api suspects that a hostile entity is loose and is both relieved and alarmed that Hobson has encountered it. Although the two men inexplicably seem familiar to one another, neither has previously met the other. They speculate that survivors may have been underground or underwater. Hobson recalls seeing a worm but notes the complete absence of rats, suggesting that only animals below a certain size survived underground and making human survivors unlikely.

In the capital, Hobson and Api stay in a hotel and search unsuccessfully for survivors while Hobson attempts to determine the nature of the Effect and why they survived. Api later goes skin-diving for shellfish and jokingly pretends to drown. Hobson instinctively holds his head underwater until Api breaks free. Hobson explains that his autistic son drowned in a bathtub, and both men realise that Hobson does not have complete control over his actions.

Three weeks after the Effect, Hobson discovers photographs of Api during the Vietnam War, posing with mutilated Viet Cong corpses, and comes to believe that Api is a psychopath. Their relationship deteriorates, and Hobson plans to kill Api with sleeping pills. While searching for a boat to the South Island, both men experience another attack of dread from the unseen "force". Api subsequently takes Hobson for a drive in his Lotus Elite, but they hit a woman, who is taken to the hotel critically injured. As her condition worsens, the men argue, while Hobson senses the force emanating from the deserted city.

Api studies the Bible and concludes that the significance of 6:12 is linked to the Number of the Beast, 666, and Revelation 6:12, concerning people hiding from the face of God. Hobson rejects this explanation and secretly holds a gun on Api. When the injured woman dies, Api becomes hysterical, and another argument escalates into a fight. Hobson kills him after Api gives up.

Hobson then reads Perrin's papers and learns that his colleagues considered him unstable and had placed him under surveillance. Perrin believed radiation had altered Hobson's DNA, causing his son's autism. Hobson concludes that his experiments may have caused the Effect. In a flashback, he remembers an accident involving the sound-wave and radiation machine, for which Perrin blamed him. Hobson had previously sabotaged the machine to prevent Perrin from using it, then taken what he believed was a fatal dose of sleeping pills.

Hobson realises that his sabotage almost certainly caused the Effect, but that he subconsciously altered his own memories to conceal this. He recognises that his ability to edit his recollections and retreat into a mental "super-reality" is automatic. He finally accepts responsibility for allowing his son to drown, interpreting his son's disability as a reflection of his own emptiness and his death as a form of "committing suicide".

Questioning whether his reality is genuine and whether he is in Hell, Hobson concludes that he bears responsibility for humanity's destruction and jumps from the hotel. As he falls, he awakens in the hotel room from the beginning. Recovering from the nightmare of falling, which is all he can remember, he notices that his wristwatch has stopped at 6:12.

== Reception and legacy ==
Following the book's publication, The Quiet Earth was lauded and is widely considered to be one of Harrison's best works. The book was later shortlisted for the New Zealand Book of the Year award. The Quiet Earth was later adapted into a film of the same name in 1985, directed by Geoff Murphy.

In 2013, the book was republished by Text Publishing as part of their Text Classics series, along with an introduction by New Zealand writer Bernard Buckett.
