= Annie Whittle =

New Zealand singer and actress

- Born: Manchester, England
- Occupations: Actress; singer

Annie Whittle (born c. 1947) is a British-born New Zealand singer and actress who has appeared on such shows as Shortland Street, where she played Barbara Heywood for four years and has had a singing career that has spanned three decades. She was previously married to director and producer Bruce Morrison.

Her most notable film appearances were in The World's Fastest Indian (2005) and Bellbird (2019) - the latter film received several prizes at international film festivals.

== Filmography ==
=== Television ===
- A Week of It (1977–1979) .... Various Characters
- Castaways .... "Castaways of the General Grant" (1978)
- "Show of the Week - Annie Whittle Performs" (1979) .... Herself
- Under the Mountain (1982) .... Mrs. Matheson in "Maar" (1982)
- An Age Apart (1983) .... Air Hostess in Episode #1.1 (1983)
- The Makutu on Mrs Jones (1983) .... Mrs Jones
- The Billy T. James Show (1984) .... Various roles
- "Then Again" (1986) .... Herself
- "Holiday" (1988) .... Herself
- "The Shadow Trader" (1988) .... Tammy
- "Heartland" (2001) .... Herself
- Shortland Street (2001–2005) .... Barbara Heywood
- Kai Korero (2006) TV series .... Muriel Spalding
- Amazing Extraordinary Friends (2008) .... Madame Lulu in "Love and Marriage" (20 September 2008)
- Outrageous Fortune (2006–2007) .... Bev
- Go Girls (2009) .... Jan McMann

=== Film ===
- Trial Run (1984) .... Rosemary Edmonds
- Queen City Rocker (1986) .... Drunk Wife
- The World's Fastest Indian (2005) .... Fran
- Piece of My Heart (2009) .... Flora
- Bellbird (2019) .... Beth

== Discography ==
Date	Title	Label	Catalog Number
Albums
2002	Tequila Sunrise – The Best of Annie Whittle		

=== Singles ===
Year	Single	Album	NZ Singles Chart	Certification
1974	"Love I Feel"		–	–
1976	"When You Walk in the Room"		18	–
1976	"Tequila Sunrise"		8	–

== Awards ==
Won the New Zealand Recording Industry Award for Top Female Recording Artist twice, in 1975 and in 1976.
