= Journey for Three =

New Zealand black-and-white immigration propaganda film

- Directed by: Michael Forlong
- Written by: Michael Forlong
- Produced by: Stanhope Andrews
- Starring: Elizabeth Armstrong; Margaret McNulty; Stewart Pilkington
- Cinematography: Randal Beattie
- Edited by: Michael Forlong
- Music by: Douglas Lilburn
- Production company: National Film Unit
- Distributed by: NZ Film Archives
- Release date: 1950
- Running time: 45 minutes
- Country: New Zealand
- Language: English

Journey for Three is a 1950 New Zealand black-and-white immigration propaganda film.

== Synopsis ==
This film dramatised postwar immigration to New Zealand. Three British citizens travel and settle down in New Zealand, and the film shows their hopes, jobs, challenges, and adventures.

== Cast ==
- Elizabeth Armstrong as Cassie McLeod
- Margaret McNulty as Margaret Allen
- Stewart Pilkington as Harry White
- Francis Renner as The Foreman

== Production ==
This was an immigration propaganda film production released by the National Film Unit. The film had a theatrical release in the UK.

== Reviews ==
- 1950 Ashburton Guardian - Comment on N.Z. film.
- 1995 featured in New Zealand's contribution to the British Film Institute's Century of Cinema series - Cinema of Unease: A Personal Journey by Sam Neill.
- 2011 "...made by the New Zealand National Film Unit, was the most ambitious film the Unit had ever embarked on."
