= Country Lads =

Short New Zealand patriotic propaganda film

- Directed by: Stanhope Andrews
- Produced by: Stanhope Andrews
- Edited by: Stanhope Andrews
- Production company: National Film Unit
- Distributed by: NZ Film Archives
- Release date: 1941
- Running time: 9 minutes
- Country: New Zealand
- Language: English

Country Lads is a 1941 New Zealand patriotic propaganda film. It was produced by the National Film Unit for the New Zealand war effort.

== Synopsis ==
Adolf Hitler had referred to New Zealand soldiers as "poor, deluded country lads". Country Lads shows the pride of Kiwi troops, emphasising ordinary men and women from all walks of life taking up the call to serve. It shows the impact of war on the society of New Zealand in the 1940s. The dockside goodbyes to loved ones are still poignant today.

Our army, ourselves ... civilian into soldier. It's an old story, but this time it is about us, and that makes it different. There is no goose-stepping here, just the swinging stride of free men who have put on their working clothes and got into step for the biggest job ever tackled.

... the narrator

== Production ==
Country Lads was the first production by the newly reorganised National Film Unit.

== Reviews ==
- 1995 featured in New Zealand's contribution to the British Film Institute's Century of Cinema series - Cinema of Unease: A Personal Journey by Sam Neill.
