= Dagg Day Afternoon =

1977 New Zealand comedy film

- Directed by: John Clarke; Geoff Murphy
- Written by: John Clarke; Geoff Murphy
- Produced by: John Barnett
- Starring: John Clarke; Derek Payne; Michael Wilson
- Cinematography: Alun Bollinger; Norman Elder
- Edited by: Michael J. Horton
- Music by: Dave Fraser
- Production companies: Acme Sausage Company; Endeavour Films; Huntaway Films
- Release date: 1977
- Running time: 37 minutes
- Country: New Zealand
- Language: English

Dagg Day Afternoon is a 1977 New Zealand action comedy film, starring John Clarke. It was written and directed by John Clarke and Geoff Murphy.

In the film, a ram has received bionic enhancements, but has since been lost. Fred Dagg is tasked with locating the missing ram.

== Synopsis ==
Fred Dagg's secret mission to find a "bionic sheep" (or 6 million dollar ram) which has been lost by the government is shown in a series of sketches.

== Cast ==
- John Clarke as Fred Dagg
- Paul Birch as Trevor
- Robert Birse as Trevor
- Duncan Emmerson as Trevor
- Peter Fyfe as Bruce Bayliss
- William Gruar as Trevor
- Dick Jones as Waiter at Mon Desir
- Michael McDonald as Gav (Dalgety store worker)
- Victor Moir as Trevor
- Geoff Murphy as Man standing on the street
- Derek Payne as Army officer
- Nevan Rowe as Flight attendant
- Mike Ward as Trevor
- Michael Wilson as Secret agent
- Guy Witten as Trevor

== Reviews ==
- 1977 The Press Wild man attacks TV viewers.
