= Fred Dagg =

Fictional human

Fred Dagg is a fictional character from New Zealand created and acted on stage, film and television by satirist John Clarke. Clarke appeared on New Zealand TV screens as Dagg during the mid to late 1970s, "taking the piss" out of the post-pioneering Kiwi "blokes" and "blokesses". The sense of the name "Dagg" is associated with the slang term dag. The Fred Dagg character is a stereotypical farmer and New Zealand bloke: clad in a black singlet and gumboots, hailing from the isolated rural town of Taihape, and attended by numerous associates (or sons) all named "Trev". One memorable expression was uttered whenever there was a knock at the door: "That'll be the door." When Clarke first unveiled the character of Fred Dagg in recordings and on New Zealand TV in 1975, he became a national star. He also recorded a series of records and cassettes as Dagg, as well as publishing several books.

In 1977, Clarke moved from New Zealand to Australia, where he went on to establish himself as a top script writer and personality.

He appeared regularly on Australian television delivering political satire sketches with actor comedian Bryan Dawe until his death in April 2017.

== Influence ==
Clarke stated that the inspiration for Fred Dagg came primarily from his uncles who would talk in such a way, using intonation and speech rhythm, to cause laughter without the standard telling of jokes.

Much of the comedy coming into New Zealand at the time was British radio and this was an inspiration to him.

== Works ==
John Clarke slowly refined the character of Fred Dagg in short comedic interview segments that screened occasionally on the New Zealand current affairs show Nationwide throughout 1974. In December of that year the character was the subject of a satirical mockumentary spoof episode on the NZBC farming show, Country Calendar. Fred Dagg went on to become a household name in New Zealand in 1975 with further comedy skit appearances on the Television One news programme Tonight at Nine and with the release by Clarke (as Dagg) of two singles with EMI, "Traditional Air"/"Unlabelled", and "We Don't Know How Lucky We Are"/"Larry Loves Barry", with the latter making it to number 17 on the national music single charts.

An album called Fred Dagg's Greatest Hits followed and was a massive seller. Thirty years after its release this album remains one of New Zealand's all-time biggest selling records.

Another single recorded with Diamond Lil was an even bigger hit in 1976. "Gumboots"/"Save The Last Dance For Me" climbed to number 6 on the charts. "Gumboots" was a modified version of Billy Connolly's "If It Wasna For Your Wellies", itself an adaptation of the old song "The Work Of The Weavers".

A second album, Fred Dagg Live was released in 1976. Following on in the style of the first, it was also a huge seller.

1977 saw the release of the film Dagg Day Afternoon, co-directed and co-written by John Clarke and Geoff Murphy, and starring Fred Dagg. The film, under 45 minutes long, is essentially a series of sketches tied together with a loose narrative about Dagg's secret mission to find a "bionic sheep" (or 6 million dollar ram) which has been lost by the government.

By 1978 John Clarke and his young family had settled in Australia but he briefly commuted back to New Zealand during that year to create a Fred Dagg television series for South Pacific Television (TV2). The Fred Dagg Lectures on Leisure consisted of 20 five-minute long episodes which screened Sunday nights from September 1978 through to February 1979. The programmes featured Fred holding forth on a variety of diverse subjects such as golf, photography, how to write an autobiography, UFO spotting, saving whales and tree-felling. The original master tapes of all these episodes no longer exist and are thought to have either been wiped or lost by SPTV when the company was dissolved and amalgamated with Television One in 1980.

A third and final album was released in 1979 called The Fred Dagg Tapes.

In 1998 the Fred Dagg Anthology CD was released by Columbia. It contained most of Dagg's best-known material. A lot of the second half of the Anthology isn't genuine "Fred Dagg" material, having been created by Clarke after he'd retired Fred Dagg and moved to Australia. A number of mock interviews were first broadcast on Australian current affairs television, and lampoon prominent people (such as businessman Alan Bond) who would not be familiar to a New Zealand audience. There are also six "farnarkeling" reports, which parody sports news and were first performed by Clarke on the ABC's The Gillies Report.

"We Don't Know How Lucky We Are!" was re-released in 1998 with revised lyrics. This re-recording was driven by Graeme Hill, and Sky TV's SportsCafe.

== Discography ==
=== Studio and live albums ===
List of albums
Title	Album details	Peak chart positions
Title	Album details	AUS
Fred Dagg's Greatest Hits	Released: 1975; Label: EMI (DAGG 1); Format: LP, Cassette	-
Fred Dagg Live	Released: 1976; Label: EMI (DAGG 3); Format: LP, Cassette	-
The Fred Dagg Tapes	Released: 1979; Label: EMI (EMC 159); Format: LP, CD	36

=== Compilation albums ===
List of compilation
Title	Album details	Peak chart positions	Certifications
Title	Album details	NZ	Certifications
Fred Dagg Anthology	Released: 1998; Label: Columbia (489885-2); Format: CD, Cassette	2	RMNZ: Gold
The Taihape Years	Released: August 2008; Label: Jigsaw; Format: CD, DD	34	

== See also ==
- Agriculture in New Zealand
- Gumboot Day
