= John Charles (composer) =

- Birth name: John Joseph Charles
- Born: 4 November 1940
- Origin: Wellington, New Zealand
- Died: 7 May 2024 (aged 83)
- Genres: Film scores
- Occupation(s): Composer, conductor, pianist
- Instrument: Piano
- Years active: 1979–2004

John Joseph Charles (4 November 1940 – 7 May 2024) was a New Zealand film composer, conductor, and orchestrator. He created a number of musical works for the New Zealand cinema of the 1980s, 1990s and 2000s, including compositions for films such as Goodbye Pork Pie, Utu, The Quiet Earth, A Soldier's Tale or Spooked.

== Life and career ==
Born in Wellington, Charles studied art at the Victoria University of Wellington. At the same time, he played jazz music in the university club. During his studies, he worked as a newspaper journalist and as a programmer for the New Zealand Broadcasting Service. With a Bachelor of Music degree, he returned to NZBC and worked as a producer and director. With experience directing a television play in 1973 and directing two episodes of a comedy series, he moved to Australia in 1974 and composed the music for his first television film, The God Boy.

The director with whom Charles worked most often in his career was jazz trumpeter and filmmaker Geoff Murphy. Their acquaintance dates back to 1966 and Murphy's first film, the unfinished children's musical The Magic Hammer. The two starred together as part of the 1970s touring group Blerta and on the Murphy-directed TV show of the same name. Together they turned to the realization of several New Zealand cinema projects in the late 1979s and early 1980s. While Murphy was directing, Charles composed the soundtracks to the films Goodbye Pork Pie, for which Charles wrote a jazz score, the Māori drama Utu, which has a predominantly symphonic score, and the dystopian, award-winning science fiction drama The Quiet Earth, in which he also processed avant-garde and experimental sounds in addition to symphonic ones. Director Murphy and leading actor Bruno Lawrence received several awards for the film The Quiet Earth, including the New Zealand Film and TV Award. Finally, in 2004, the mystery drama Spooked starring Cliff Curtis was created, the last joint work by Charles and Murphy.

In 1996, Charles joined the Australian Film and Broadcasting School as composer-in-residence, where he taught composition for more than a decade.

He died at home, surrounded by his family, after a struggle with dementia. He had married Judy Robins, whose sister Pat had married Geoff Murphy.

== Select filmography ==
- 1977: Wild Man
- 1979: Jack Winter's Dream (based on a 1959 play by James K. Baxter)
- 1980: Goodbye Pork Pie
- 1983: Utu
- 1984: Constance
- 1985: The Quiet Earth
- 1988: Zombie Brigade
- 1989: A Soldier's Tale
- 1993: Bread & Roses
- 1994: The Last Tattoo
- 2004: Spooked
