= List of New Zealand submissions for the Academy Award for Best International Feature Film =

List of films

Best International Feature Film submissions from New Zealand

Highlights
- Debut: 2011
- Submissions: 8
- Nominations: none
- Oscar winners: none

New Zealand submitted a film for the Academy Award for Best International Feature Film (Note: The category was previously named the Academy Award for Best Foreign Language Film, but this was changed to the Academy Award for Best International Feature Film in April 2019, after the Academy deemed the word "Foreign" to be outdated.) for the first time in 2011. The award is handed out annually by the United States Academy of Motion Picture Arts and Sciences to a feature-length motion picture produced outside the United States that contains primarily non-English dialogue. It was not created until the 1956 Academy Awards, in which a competitive Academy Award of Merit, known as the Best Foreign Language Film Award, was created for non-English speaking films, and has been given annually since.

As of 2026, New Zealand has submitted eight films, but none of them were nominated.

== Submissions ==
The Academy of Motion Picture Arts and Sciences has invited the film industries of various countries to submit their best film for the Academy Award for Best International Feature Film since 1956. The International Feature Film Committee oversees the process and reviews all the submitted films. Following this, they vote via secret ballot to determine the five nominees for the award.

Below is a list of the films that have been submitted by New Zealand for review by the academy for the award by year and the respective Academy Awards ceremony.

Year (Ceremony)	Film title used in nomination	Original title	Language(s)	Director	Result
2011 (84th)	The Orator	O Le Tulafale	Samoan	Tusi Tamasese	Not nominated
2013 (86th)	White Lies	Tuakiri Huna	Māori	Dana Rotberg	Not nominated
2014 (87th)	The Dead Lands		Māori	Toa Fraser	Not nominated
2016 (89th)	A Flickering Truth		Dari	Pietra Brettkelly	Not nominated
2017 (90th)	One Thousand Ropes		Samoan	Tusi Tamasese	Not nominated
2018 (91st)	Yellow Is Forbidden		Chinese	Pietra Brettkelly	Not nominated
2022 (95th)	Muru		Māori, English	Tearepa Kahi	Not nominated
2026 (99th)	Mārama		Māori, English	Taratoa Stappard	Pending

== See also ==
- List of Academy Award winners and nominees for Best International Feature Film
- List of Academy Award–winning foreign-language films
