= Uproar (film) =

2023 film directed by Paul Middleditch and Hamish Bennett

- Film poster
- Directed by: Paul Middleditch; Hamish Bennett
- Screenplay by: Hamish Bennett, Sonia Whiteman
- Produced by: Emma Slade, Angela Cudd, Sandra Kailahi
- Starring: Julian Dennison; Rhys Darby; Minnie Driver; James Rolleston; Erana James
- Cinematography: María Inés Manchego
- Music by: Karl Sölve Steven
- Production companies: Blue Fox Entertainment; New Zealand Film Commission
- Distributed by: Kismet
- Release dates: 7 September 2023 (TIFF); 5 October 2023 (New Zealand)
- Running time: 110 minutes
- Country: New Zealand
- Language: English
- Box office: $768,664

Uproar is a 2023 New Zealand coming-of-age comedy-drama film directed by Paul Middleditch and Hamish Bennett, and starring Julian Dennison, Rhys Darby and Minnie Driver. The screenplay was written by Bennett and Sonia Whiteman. It relates the story of a 17-year-old boy who is drawn into political activism to stand up for himself, his family and his future. Uproar was released to critical acclaim.

== Plot ==
In 1981, teenager Josh Waaka lives with his widowed English-born mother Shirley and older brother Jamie in Dunedin. Josh and Jamie are of mixed Māori and European heritage, with their late father being Māori. Josh attends the private school St Gilbert's School for Men, which is governed by the authoritarian Principal Slane, who supports the 1981 Springboks tour and condemns the anti-tour protests as unpatriotic. Jamie was once a star rugby union player in the school rugby team until he suffered a crippling leg injury.

Josh struggles with the expectations of his rugby-obsessed family and isolating school with his own personal aspirations of becoming an actor. Josh, being corpulent and the only Māori in a European majority school, finds himself alone and bonds with the drama teacher Brother Madigan, who encourages Josh to apply for a place at the National Institute of Dramatic Art in Australia. Through local activist Samantha, Josh is reluctantly drawn into the growing anti-tour movement, which draws the support of several members of Dunedin's Māori community including her aunt Tui. Samantha sees parallels between the dispossession of Māori and the plight of Black South Africans.

Seeking to win the high school rugby season, Principal Slane and Coach Dennis enlist the services of Jamie in coaching St Gilbert's rugby team. Shirley agrees to the arrangement on the condition that Josh can join the rugby team. At the urging of Samantha, Josh borrows Madigan's camera to film an anti-tour protest in Dunedin. After pro-tour supporters attack the protesters, the Police attack and brutally disperse the anti-tour protesters, with Tui being hospitalised. Josh captures footage of the protest.

After Josh appears in the front page of the local newspaper, Principal Slane wants to expel him but backs down after Jamie threatens to resign as assistant coach. Due to the grueling demands of the rugby season, Josh is forced to pull out of the drama club, causing him to miss a key audition. Despite these pressures, Josh is still determined to pursue his acting dream and convinces Madigan to film an audition, drawing on the play Foreskin's Lament. After Madigan provides Shirley with a recording of the audition, she comes to accept Josh's acting aspirations.

Despite his lack of sporting talent, Josh helps St Gilbert's rugby team win a narrow victory over a competing team. The victory celebration is marred by an arson attack on the local marae. Principal Slane obstructs the Police investigation by claiming that the entire team attended a drinking party at Dennis' home. Growing disenchanted with Slane's apathy towards injustice and oppression, Josh stages a sit-in during a crucial rugby match. He is joined by Shirley, Jamie, Brother Madigan, Samantha and several rugby players. Their silent protest brings the game to a halt.

Following the match, Jamie provides evidence to the Police challenging Slane's account of the marae fire. The film ends in 1984 with Josh lining up to attend an acting audition at a new school.

== Cast ==
- Julian Dennison as Josh Waaka
- Rhys Darby as Brother Madigan
- Minnie Driver as Shirley Waaka
- James Rolleston as Jamie Waaka
- Erana James as Samantha
- Mark Mitchinson as Principal Slane
- Mabelle Dennison as Tui
- John Leigh as Dennis

== Production ==
=== Development ===
Uproar is loosely based on Paul Middleditch's own personal experiences as a teenager growing up in Wellington during the 1980s. He described the film as a "pretty personal project for me... Like Josh (Dennison) I was the awkward kid with glasses – an outsider with a passion for art and film in a sport obsessed school, trying to figure out my path." Cast member Julian Dennison, who is of mixed Ngāi Takoto and Pākehā/European New Zealander descent, said that he hoped that the film would help young Māori to embrace their culture. To ensure an authentic representation of kaupapa Māori (Māori culture) in the film, screenwriter Hamish Bennett confirmed that the production consulted with Māori groups at every stage including scriptwriting and casting.

=== Filming ===
The movie was filmed in Dunedin over a period of 26 days. Māori groups were involved in the performance and filming of haka (war dance) scenes.

== Release ==
Uproar had its world premiere at the 2023 Toronto International Film Festival on 7 September 2023. The film received a wide theatrical release in New Zealand on 5 October 2023. In its opening weekend at the New Zealand box office, the film placed fourth, making USD$121,402. The film was also theatrically released in Australia on 30 November 2023. Uproar grossed $739,900 in New Zealand and Australia. The US release date was announced for 15 March 2024.

== Critical reception ==
On the review aggregator website Rotten Tomatoes, 100% of 23 critics' reviews are positive, with an average rating of 7.6/10.

The New Zealand Herald praised Dennison's performance in their review and dubbed the film "powerful and emotional". Stuff.co.nz reviewed it as "funny, poignant and emotional" and an "entertaining '80s-set dramedy". The Curb praised the film saying that Uproar was "a funny, kind, warm, and bittersweet story about acceptance and rebellion". Reviewer Nadine Whitney dubbed Uproar "a triumph". Exclaim! reviewed it as "a powerful coming-of-age drama highlighting a tense political clash that viewers outside of New Zealand probably know nothing about".

RogerEbert.com's review praised Dennison's work saying; "[he] brings his signature warmth, humor, and pathos for a singular and deeply affecting performance". FilmInk also highlighted Dennison's role, saying: "it’s in this role that the lad truly shines as an actor". Reviewer Cain Noble-Davies concluded; "[Uproar] is a hard-hitter that benefits from confident presentation and conviction in its storytelling."
