= Yellow Is Forbidden =

2018 film

- Film poster
- Directed by: Pietra Brettkelly
- Written by: Pietra Brettkelly
- Music by: Tom Third
- Distributed by: Madman Entertainment
- Release dates: 21 April 2018 (Tribeca); July 2018 (New Zealand)
- Running time: 97 minutes
- Country: New Zealand
- Language: Chinese
- Box office: $26,659

Yellow Is Forbidden is a 2018 New Zealand documentary film directed by Pietra Brettkelly. It was selected as the New Zealand entry for the Best Foreign Language Film at the 91st Academy Awards, but it was not nominated.

== See also ==
- List of submissions to the 91st Academy Awards for Best Foreign Language Film
- List of New Zealand submissions for the Academy Award for Best Foreign Language Film
