= Men Shouldn't Sing =

2007 film

- Directed by: Sarah Higginson; Michael Bell
- Written by: Jeff Clark
- Produced by: Michael Bell
- Starring: Jennine Bailey; Lynn Booth; Scott Koorey; Lucy MacVicar; Gary Miller; James Nation-Ingle; West Relugas; Sam Taylor; Michal Williams
- Cinematography: Rex Gibson
- Edited by: Reuben Bijl
- Music by: Michael Bell
- Release date: 2 December 2007
- Running time: 108 minutes
- Country: New Zealand
- Language: English

Men Shouldn't Sing is a musical comedy New Zealand film written by Jeff Clark and composed by Michael Bell. It tells the story of a group of strangers, snatched from their homes, who wake to find that they spontaneously break into song and dance whenever they feel a heightened emotion. The group, trapped in a musical that is becoming more dangerous by the minute, must work together to find a way out.

Men Shouldn't Sing had its premiere on 2 December 2007 at the Isaac Theatre Royal in Christchurch, New Zealand.

== Cast ==
- Jennine Bailey as Gina
- Lynn Booth as Carol
- Scott Koorey as Dr. Lloyd-Menkin
- Lucy MacVicar as Felicity
- Gary Miller as Brian
- James Nation-Ingle as Doug
- West Relugas as Hans
- Sam Taylor as Pete
- Michal Williams as Steph

== Soundtrack and songs ==
All Songs Recorded by the Orange Studio Orchestra

1. Overture
2. Something's Wrong
3. Can't Stop Singing
4. Who's in Charge
5. Hans' Lament
6. Dr Phil
7. Zombie Boogie
8. Love Street
9. Can't Say It Right Without A Song
10. Men Shouldn't Sing
11. Slightly Inappropriate Feelings
12. Men Shouldn't Sing Reprise
13. Zombie Ballet
14. Endgame
15. Don't Call Me Mad
