= Opening of the Auckland Industrial and Mining Exhibition =

- Based on: Documentary
- Cinematography: W. H. Bartlett
- Distributed by: Alfred Henry Whitehouse
- Release date: 24 December 1898
- Country: New Zealand
- Language: Silent

Opening of the Auckland Industrial and Mining Exhibition was an 1898 New Zealand silent documentary film.

The earliest New Zealand films being from the first of December 1898, the opening of the Auckland Industrial and Mining Exhibition, and Boxing Day that year, Uhlan winning the Auckland Cup at Ellerslie Racecourse.

== Synopsis ==
The film included scenes of the Newton Band playing, the governor arriving with a cavalry escort, and people entering the building.
