= Down by the Riverside (film) =

- Directed by: Brad Davison; Marama Killen
- Written by: Brad Davison; Marama Killen; Joe Hitchcock
- Produced by: Joe Hitchcock; Brad Davison; Marama Killen
- Starring: Rebecca Trelease; Toby Sharpe; Maia Wharawhara; Ross MacLeod
- Cinematography: Joe Hitchcock
- Edited by: Brad Davison; Marama Killen; Joe Hitchcock
- Music by: Jeremy Mayall
- Distributed by: Vendetta Films
- Release date: 2 November 2007
- Running time: 84 minutes
- Country: New Zealand
- Languages: English; Māori

Down by the Riverside is a 2007 New Zealand independent neo-noir horror film produced and directed by Brad Davison and Marama Killen, and written by Davison and Killen with Joe Hitchcock.

== Synopsis ==
The film relates to a mystery story of multiple murders over a period of 20 years. It begins in the early twentieth century when several pregnant girls meet in a country house for unwed mothers where they have been sent to give birth and have their children adopted. The girls are never seen by outsiders again, and after lengthy investigation, the police file is left unclosed. Nearly twenty years pass and professor Owen Smith (Toby Sharpe) and his assistant Amelia Laird (Rebecca Trelease) return to the house to investigate and document the now mythical murder case. They explore the house and quickly discover the secret.

== Cast ==
- Rebecca Trelease
- Toby Sharpe
- Maia Wharawhara
- Ross MacLeod

== Production ==
Down by the Riverside went into production in October 2005, and filming began January 2006 in Te Aroha in the Waikato region, New Zealand. There were production problems that prevented completion until July 2007, when the film was picked up for distribution by Siren Visual Entertainment. The film had its New Zealand premiere on 7 November 2007.

== Reception ==
The film was nominated for "Best Foreign Feature" and Rebecca Trelease for "Best Actress" at the 2007 B-Movie Film Festival in Syracuse, New York.
