= Michael J. Horton =

New Zealand film editor

Michael Horton
- Born: Lower Hutt, New Zealand
- Occupation: Film editor

Michael J. Horton is a New Zealand film editor. He was nominated for an Academy Award for the 2002 film The Lord of the Rings: The Two Towers that was directed by Peter Jackson.

Horton was born in Lower Hutt, Wellington, in New Zealand. He was educated at Saint Patricks College in Wellington. He began working as a film editor with the New Zealand Broadcasting Corporation in the mid-sixties. He began working with the director Geoff Murphy in the 1970s. In 1981, he edited Goodbye Pork Pie (1981) with Murphy, which was very successful commercially within New Zealand and thus an important impetus to the development of New Zealand Cinema. Horton worked with Murphy on two other successful projects in the mid-1980s before Murphy's departure for the United States. Following Murphy's return to New Zealand, Horton and Murphy reunited on Spooked (2004).

== Selected filmography ==
- Dagg Day Afternoon (1977)
- Goodbye Pork Pie (1981)
- Smash Palace (1981)
- Utu (1983)
- The Quiet Earth (1985)
- Footrot Flats: The Dog's Tale (1986)
- The End of the Golden Weather (1991)
- The Sound and the Silence (1992)
- Once Were Warriors (1994)
- Cinema of Unease (1995)
- Forgotten Silver (1995)
- What Becomes of the Broken Hearted? (1999)
- The Lord of the Rings: The Two Towers (2002)
- Spooked (2004)
- Forgive Us All (2023)
