= Pietra Brettkelly =

New Zealand filmmaker

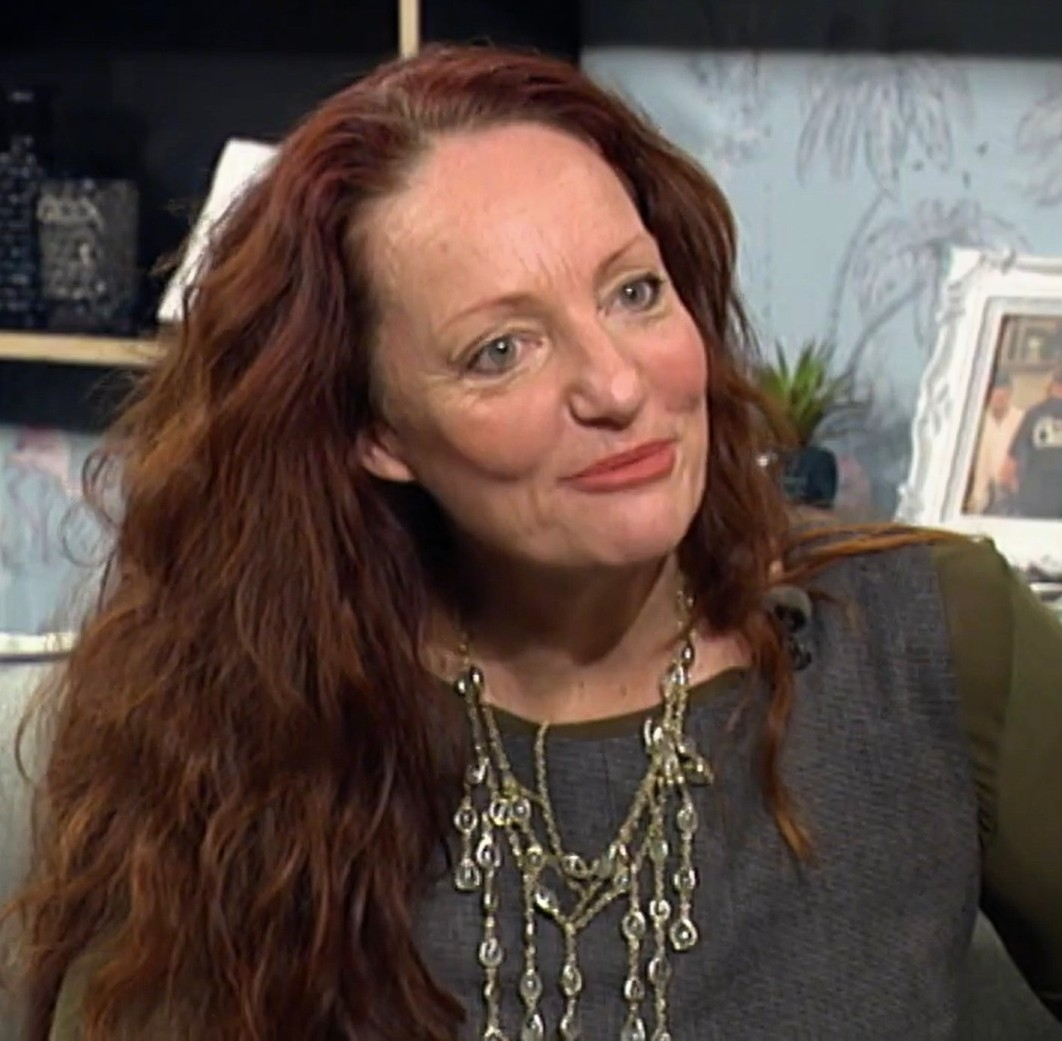
- Brettkelly in 2018
- Born: 1965 (age 60–61); New Zealand
- Occupation: Filmmaker
- Years active: 2003–present

Pietra Brettkelly (born 1965) is a New Zealand filmmaker, known for her documentaries. She is a documentary filmmaker submitted three times for Oscar consideration, a member of The Academy of Motion Pictures Arts and Sciences, and is the inaugural Arts Laureate of New Zealand in Documentary Film. Her films have premiered in five of the world's top six film festivals – Sundance, Toronto, Venice, Berlin and Tribeca Film Festivals – and have garnered many awards. She is known for her independent, risk-taking style, which has taken her to many different countries. She approaches her subjects' lives with a "quiet" demeanor and "non-judgmental" attitude, allowing her to capture and document real stories.

== Early life and education ==
Brettkelly was born in Whakatane, New Zealand in 1965. She has mentioned that there was not a film school in New Zealand at that time. She did not receive a film education and said that, "I couldn’t say that theoretically or academically I’ve studied filmmakers to know what they would do or how they would approach something."

Brettkelly wrote about herself, "My parents took me from Papua New Guinea to Portugal, encouraging a wonder and appreciation for the diversity of peoples and their stories". Additionally, she travelled the world as a journalist before directing her first documentary "Beauty Will Save the World" (2003) about the first ever beauty pageant in Libya. VIVA Magazine wrote of Brettkelly: "An extraordinary person who has led an extraordinary life… from Libya to Sudan, Afghanistan and China". When she was first starting out, traveling and experiencing new cultures seemed to be her greatest teacher when it came to making a documentary.

== Documentary career ==
CROCODILE had its World Premiere at the Berlin International Film Festival in February 2026. Filmed over many years, CROCODILE follows a group young filmmakers in Kaduna, Nigeria. Armed with little more than mobile phones and imagination, , known collectively as The Critics, transform their backyard into sci-fi universes. "Nollywood may be globally recognised as the dominant creative output from Nigeria, but The Critics are situated on the periphery of a cinematic periphery: a lesser-known city that’s not on the map of the Nigerian film industry. With the fittingly punky documentary Crocodile, New Zealand-based director Pietra Brettkelly captured how these adolescents had to carve out a radical film practice of their own, in a city where film initially found no footing."

Executive Produced by Idris Elba, CROCODILE had its North American premiere at Tribeca Film Festival in June 2026 where it won the Viewpoints Award. Elba told Screen Daily that "their story is moving and their tenacity inspiring. It shows a side of Africa I hadn’t seen on screen before”. The film also marked a shift in Brettkelly's practice; working with The Critics as co-directors, and also making them co-owners of the film.

CROCODILE has also screened at Sheffield DocFest, where it won the Youth Jury Prize; won Best Arts Documentary at MDAG in Warsaw, Poland; and also won entry to the New Zealand International Film Festival; the Sydney Film Festival and festivals in Croatia, Paris and Kazakhstan. The Hollywood Reporter called it "a remarkable story of persistence, imagination and self-determination.”

Brettkelly's 2018 film, Yellow Is Forbidden, premiered In Competition and Opening Weekend at Tribeca Film Festival. The film was selected for both the Best Foreign Language and Best Documentary sections of the Oscars. Vogue Magazine noted it as a, "film that is … a celebration of how extraordinary women are", while the Sydney Morning Herald called it, "[a] deliciously intimate film ... a near visceral experience". The film follows the rise of talented Chinese haute couturier Guo Pei. In an article, Rebekah Brammer describes the documentary as depicting the meticulous images of magnificent gowns, intimate footage, insightful interviews, culture clash, craft and aspiration, and the grueling labor behind high fashion. Brammer says, "Brettkelly’s portrayal of Guo, with all her contradictions, leaves the audience, whether interested in fashion or not, wanting to know more about her".

Brettkelly's film, A Flickering Truth, which documents the unearthing of the Afghan Film Archive in Kabul, Afghanistan, premiered at the 2015 Venice Film Festival and Toronto Film Festival to critical acclaim. It received a four star review in The Guardian, which described it as "an astounding film". Deborah Young of The Hollywood Reporter praised the film, describing it as, "a documentary not just for archivists but for those who see film as a vital part of local culture", while Indiewire writer Eric Kohn called the movie an "eye-opening documentary ... a moving navigation of Afghanistan’s past and present". A Flickering Truth was selected as the New Zealand entrant for the 2016 Best Foreign Language at the Oscars. Brettkelly said about the film, "When I first went to Afghanistan, I found the people so different from what I have been fed through media and reportage," and thus, her mission became to tell a story that completely altered awareness of Afghans.

In 2012, Brettkelly's Māori Boy Genius premiered In Competition at Berlin Film Festival. It follows a boy named Ngaa Rauuira Pumanawawhit, after he's accepted into Yale summer school.

Brettkelly met Italian artist Vanessa Beecroft when filming in Sudan after the end of one of the longest running civil war in African history. Beecroft is famous for her provocative performance art, and while in Sudan for a project had decided to try and adopt motherless twins. Brettkelly eventually followed Beecroft's adoption efforts over 16 months, which formed the basis for The Art Star and the Sudanese Twins. Still in Motion (magazine)'s editor posited, "I felt I was in the hands of a master storyteller." The film won Best Editing in the World Documentary section of the Sundance Film Festival.

Her Beauty Will Save The World (2003)'s World Premier American Film Institute Film Festival in Los Angeles. Brettkelly's website describes the film, "Beauty Will Save The World follows the exploits of 19 year-old Teca Zendik, the American contender for the crown. She sets out with her political loyalties in check, even refusing to wear the competition uniform – a teeshirt emblazoned with Gaddafi's likeness. How then does she assume the position of honorary consul to the US for Libya in a mere matter of months? Marvel at how diplomatic ties are re-established between two nations, enjoy the behind-the-scenes antics of a beauty pageant, and seize the chance to see rare footage of Gaddafi himself in this accidental political documentary."

== Style and themes ==
Brettkelly said in an interview, "There are two common themes in all my films. One is identity and the other is isolation. Isolation, because I live in New Zealand. Identity, because I’m a first-generation New Zealander… [My parents] brought me up to be curious and to think about what I could bring to this new place." Brettkelly says, "A Flickering Truth explores identity and isolation."

In the film, Yellow is Forbidden, themes of isolation, the complexity of life, and celebrating the extreme appear also. There are many close-up shots in the film. Some are of hands, like of Guo Pei designing a garment or her sewers creating the dress, while others are of the garments themselves, with their threads, beads, and jewels sparkling in the shot. Brettkelly isolates a single item or image in these shots, often blurring the background, which visually depicts her theme of isolation.

When it comes to the documentary process, Brettkelly likes to write her films, though she doesn't follow a script when filming her documentaries. She says, "Another part of my process is I write my films, like a drama film. It’s not something that I share with anybody. Sometimes I’m writing some quite horrific moments, things that, as a human being, I don’t want to happen but, as a storyteller, I imagine are going to happen. If I write that someone dies from a bomb blast, well, over time in Afghanistan, sadly, that’s likely to happen." In the same interview, she talks about one specific scene where this writing process stuck out in her mind, "That scene of the young woman at a screening who looks at the camera, I wrote that. It was two years before we filmed it. Of course, I tell Jake [cinematographer Jacob Bryant] everything so he can be on the lookout for these situations when they arise. When it was happening, he just sort of looked at me, 'can you believe this,' and the girl just stared down the camera. Her face said, I’m looking at you looking at me, and it’s OK."

Further reflecting on Brettkelly's style, Variety magazine says, "Pietra Brettkelly’s engimatic rendering … is not a straightforward artist’s profile, political commentary or domestic drama, but a poetic fusion of the three." This relates to how Brettkelly views her work, saying, "I believe my films have a considered quietness, a non-judgmental approach that allows subjects to tell their stories. I treasure the honesty and the privilege people grant me in capturing and documenting an often pivotal time in their lives." So, obviously Brettkelly's work is not straightforward. It is purposely ambiguous to highlight the genuine ambiguity present in her subjects' real lives.

Brettkelly writes, "The risks I’ve taken in making some of my documentaries exhibit either passion or craziness. I am motivated by stories that matter, the personal journeys that reflect a bigger issue."

A New Zealand Arts Laureate, Brettkelly describes herself as fascinated by the creative process of others "I’m active here in the regeneration of our indigenous language, Māori, which I’ve studied for a long time. It’s an investigation which raises a huge question: what are the mechanisms of culture? I explore that question through other people’s creativity—be it film, art, fashion, or music—while still having this strangely autobiographical connection to their work."

== Filmography ==
Filmography
Year	Title	Role	Synopsis	Notes
2026	Crocodile	Director, Producer, Writer	Teenage Nigerians make science fiction films	A collective of young Nigerians create DIY sci-fi films, finding art and support in unlikely places. Crocodile won the Tribeca film festival Viewpoint award and the Sheffield Doc Fest Youth Jury award.
2018	Yellow is Forbidden	Director, Writer, Producer	Haute couture fashion in China, following designer Guo Pei.	Premiered In Competition and Opening Weekend Tribeca Film Festival. Selected for Best Foreign Language and Best Documentary 2019 Academy Awards.
2015	A Flickering Truth	Director, Producer, Screenplay	Attempts by Ibrahim Arify to restore the Afghan Film archives in Kabul, following the Taliban capture of the city.	premiered at the 2015 Venice Film Festival and also screened as the 2015 Toronto International Film Festival. Selected for Best Foreign Language 2016 Academy Awards.
2011	Māori Boy Genius	Director, Producer, Screenplay	Ngaa Rauuira Pumanawawhiti, a 16-year-old prodigy, travels from rural New Zealand to the United States after being accepted to Summer School at Yale University.	The film premiered at the Berlin International Film Festival, and won a Moa award in 2012 for Best Documentary.
2008	The Art Star and the Sudanese Twins	Director, Producer, Screenplay	Artist Vanessa Beecroft's attempt to adopt children in Sudan.	premiered at the 2008 Sundance Film Festival. In 2009 Brettkelly was invited to screen the film at the New York's Museum of Modern Art as part of their documentary fortnight. The film presents Beecroft as a "hypocritically self-aware, colossally colonial pomo narcissist" and chronicles her "damaging quotes and appalling behavior" as she attempts to adopt two Sudanese orphans for use in an art exhibit. The Winnipeg Free Press noted that "any tendency for the observer to mock [Beecroft's] self-indulgence is mitigated by director Pietra Brettkelly's scrupulous acknowledgement of Beecroft's self-awareness".
2003	Beauty Will Save the World	Producer	Libya's first beauty pageant, following 19-year-old Teca Zendik, the American contender.	In 2003 Brettkelly travelled to Libya for that country's first ever beauty pageant. Beauty Will Save the World featured an interview with Muammar Gaddafi. Beauty Will Save The World premiered at the AFI Film Festival in October 2003, and was shown at the Hot Docs Canadian International Documentary Festival and the International Documentary Film Festival in Amsterdam in 2004.

== Awards and honors ==
Select awards
Year	Award	Organization	Award status	Notes
2020	South Pacific Pictures Award for Achievement in Film	Women in Film and Television New Zealand Awards	Won	
2019	2019 Laureate Award, Dame Gaylene Preston Award for Documentary Film-makers	Arts Foundation of New Zealand	Won	
2018	Best Foreign Language Film 2018 and Best Documentary 2018 New Zealand selection for Yellow is Forbidden	The Oscars, Academy Awards, Academy of Motion Picture Arts and Sciences	Selected but not nominated.	
2016	Producer's Award, Women In Film Best Documentary 2016	New Zealand Film Commission (NZFC)		
2016	Best Foreign Language Film Film 2016, New Zealand selection for A Flickering Truth	The Oscars, Academy Awards, Academy of Motion Picture Arts and Sciences	Selected but not nominated.	
2012	Moa Film Award for Maori Boy Genius	Rialto Channel New Zealand Film Awards		
2009	Qantas Film & Television Awards, Best Arts/Festival/Feature Documentary for The Art Star And The Sudanese Twins, and Best Director – Documentary for The Art Star And The Sudanese Twins	New Zealand Television Broadcasters' Council	Won	

== Mentoring, Workshops & Screen Industry Support ==
- Keynote Speaker, Media Federation of Australia, 2026 Leadership series: Creative & Critical Leadership for Complex Times
- International Guest, Accelerator Lab, Melbourne International Film Festival
- NZ International Film Festival: Masterclass, Aotearoa Film Focus Weekend, 2026
- Guest mentor for Jane Campion's A Wave In The Ocean filmmaking intensive, 2024
- Big Screen Symposium, Auckland New Zealand, 2016: Masterclass
- Arts Business Club, ASB Bank Auckland, Guest Panelist, 2026
- Guest Speaker, Arts Foundation of New Zealand
