= A Flickering Truth =

2015 film by Pietra Brettkelly

- Directed by: Pietra Brettkelly
- Written by: Pietra Brettkelly
- Produced by: Pietra Brettkelly
- Cinematography: Jacob Bryant
- Music by: Benjamin Wallfisch
- Release date: 5 September 2015 (Venice Film Festival)
- Country: New Zealand
- Language: Dari
- Box office: $5,382

A Flickering Truth is a 2015 New Zealand documentary film written and directed by Pietra Brettkelly. It follows the attempts by Ibrahim Arify to restore the Afghan Film archives in Kabul following the Taliban capture of the city. It world premiered in the Venice Classics section at the 72nd edition of the Venice Film Festival. It was selected as the New Zealand entry for the Best Foreign Language Film at the 89th Academy Awards but it was not nominated.

== Cast ==
- Ibrehim Arif
- Mahmoud Ghafouri
- Isaaq Yousif

== Awards and accolades ==
The movie received the Cercle D'or award for Best Documentary in the International competition at the Festival Cinéma du monde de Sherbrooke.

== See also ==
- List of submissions to the 89th Academy Awards for Best Foreign Language Film
- List of New Zealand submissions for the Academy Award for Best Foreign Language Film
