= Savage (2019 film) =

- 2019 Film Poster
- Directed by: Sam Kelly
- Written by: Sam Kelly
- Produced by: Brian Kelly; Diana Kelly; Vicky Pope; Tiare Tomaszewski; Bill Trotter; William Watson
- Starring: Jake Ryan; John Tui; Chelsie Preston Crayford; Seth Flynn
- Cinematography: James L. Brown
- Edited by: Peter Roberts
- Music by: Arli Liberman
- Production companies: POP Film; Avalon Studios Limited; New Zealand Film Commission
- Distributed by: Madman Entertainment
- Release dates: October 2019 (Busan); 18 August 2020
- Running time: 100 minutes
- Country: New Zealand
- Language: English
- Box office: $1,135,332

Savage is a 2019 crime, drama feature film, written and directed by Sam Kelly and funded by the New Zealand Film Commission. The film explores gang culture in New Zealand and stars Jake Ryan, John Tui, Chelsie Preston Crayford and Seth Flynn.

== Cast ==
- Jake Ryan as Damage
- John Tui as Moses
- Chelsie Preston Crayford as Flow
- Seth Flynn as Liam
- Peter Hambleton as Bus Driver
- James Matamua as Teen Danny

== Plot ==
Inspired by the true stories of New Zealand's street gangs across 30 years, Savage follows Danny (nicknamed “Damage”) at three defining moments in his life as he grows from a boy into the violent enforcer of a gang.

Jake Ryan as ‘Danny’ in a violent encounter with another gang member.

== Production ==
The film serves as the first feature film by New Zealand filmmaker Sam Kelly who wrote the film after producer Vicky Pope convinced him to tell a gang story in three chapters. For research, Kelly interviewed real life gang members who had been damaged by the system and lived through horrific events. The film was shot using Arriflex Alexa, a high-end digital format. The film was distributed by Madman Entertainment.

== Festivals ==
Savage was screened at a few festivals. Notably, it was part of the Down Under Film Festival and the International Film Festival Rotterdam in 2020. Additionally, it was included in the Fantasia International Film Festival. It premiered in South Korea at the Busan International Film Festival and in the UK at the BFI London Film Festival. in 2022, the film won the award for best original music in a film at the APRA Silver Scroll Awards for Most Performed New Zealand Works.

== Reception ==
The film received mostly positive reviews, earning a 75% on Rotten Tomatoes according to 28 critics.

Phil Hoad of The Guardian stated “Kelly occasionally gives in to the odd crime-drama mannerism, like the Savages swaggering out, Reservoir Dogs-style, for the first time. But he makes the smart choice of never being distracted from the emotional cost of holding your own in this self-inflicted prison of testosterone”. Granting the film 4/5 stars.

Elizabeth Kerr of The Hollywood Reporter praised both Kelly and actors Jake Ryan and John Tui, writing "Kelly wisely makes Danny and Moses' friendship and their growth (or not) the real story, and Ryan and Tui's completely believable, naturalistic dynamic serves as the movie's emotional anchor".

Mateusz Tarwacki of Eye for Film gave the film a negative 2/5 stars, stating "Although as a genre cinema, Kelly's film fits into the current wave of new gangster cinema, one cannot help but feel that the creator wanted to put a little too much into his work".
