= Bellbird (film) =

2018 film directed by Hamish Bennett

- Directed by: Hamish Bennett
- Screenplay by: Hamish Bennett
- Produced by: Orlando Stewart, Catherine Fitzgerald
- Starring: Marshall Napier; Cohen Holloway; Rachel House; Kahukura Retimana; Annie Whittle; Stephen Tamarapa
- Cinematography: Grant McKinnon
- Edited by: Jason Pengelly
- Music by: Karl Steven
- Production companies: Herringbone Productions, Stella Maria
- Distributed by: Transmission Films
- Release date: 2019
- Running time: 96 minutes
- Country: NZ
- Language: English
- Box office: $421,494

Bellbird is a 2019 New Zealand drama comedy film written and directed by Hamish Bennett, and starring Marshall Napier, Rachel House and Annie Whittle. The film is a story about loss, love and hope in a small rural community where the people are the heroes. It focuses on a father who is a farmer and his adult son, and how they face the bereavement of a wife and a mother respectively. The film also explores men's mental health and importance of community in rural life. It is also a tribute to Bennett's childhood growing up in rural New Zealand. Bellbird is Bennett's feature debut.

On its release, the film received widespread critical acclaim in New Zealand, Australia and the US. It was also awarded several prizes at film festivals. It received the "Best Screenplay Award" at the International Film Festival & Awards Macao, and the "Jury Grand Prix" at the 2021 Antipodean Film Festival in Saint Tropez.

== Cast ==
- Marshall Napier as Ross, a sixty-five year old farmer
- Cohen Holloway as Bruce - Ross's son
- Rachel House as Connie - Bruce's friend and employer
- Kahukura Retimana as Marley - a 11-year-old local who helps Ross out on the farm after school
- Annie Whittle as Beth - Ross's wife and Bruce's mother
- Stephen Tamarapa as Clem - a humorous rural vet
- Kip Chapman as Graeme
- Bree Peters as Ana

== Release ==
The film premiered at the Sydney Film Festival, and was also screened at the Melbourne International Film Festival. before its theatrical release in November 2019. Bellbird grossed $421,494 in New Zealand and Australia.

== Reception ==
The film received glowing reviews.

The Hollywood Reporter praised the film saying that "Bellbird has something special to offer", with "its lush green good looks" and its 'well-chosen cast". Their review noted "an undercurrent of humor that keeps the tone light" and "the subtlety of the actors and their ability to communicate wordlessly with each other". In a review rated four and a half stars out of five, Stuff.co.nz wrote: "Bellbird is a sweet, poignant, achingly well written and quite beautiful film. It tells its story with a minimum of fuss and dialogue, but still leaves nothing uncertain. It is funny when it needs to be, but never backs off from tragedy and loss."

Variety hailed it as "a fondly bittersweet tribute to the rural Northland" with "some astute, understated writing and warm, witty supporting turns". In a four out of five star review, The New Zealand Herald stated: "Bellbird is a joy to watch – a warm, humorous, heartfelt film filled with loss, love and hope that had me laughing out loud one moment, and crying the next." Newshub rated it four-and-a-half stars, remarking: "It's the classic Kiwi connection of man and son, talking without talking, studiously steering clear of each other's pain in order not to ignite their own, and Bennett cleverly lets the sights and sounds of the farm do some of the talking for them, punctuating proceedings with bursts of genuine hilarity."

In a positive review, ABC Arts noted that Bennett's "characters are observed with a rare level of compassion which lifts everything it touches"; reviewer Annabel Brady-Brown remarks that the film also "explores men's mental health and importance of community in rural life." ScreenDaily praised the actors' performances, writing: "Napier and Holloway turn in insightful, introspective performances that couldn’t better encapsulate the movie’s affectionately reflective mood. And while House, newcomer Retimana and Tamarapa have livelier, more comic parts, this is a film about empathy and balance in every respect, awarding its most amusing, laugh-out-loud moment belongs to its quietest character."

== Awards ==
In 2021 the film won the Jury Grand Prix, Best feature film, at the Rencontres internationales du cinéma des Antipodes (Antipodean Film Festival).
