= Uhlan (horse) =

New Zealand-bred Thoroughbred racehorse

- Sire: Cuirassier (NZ)
- Grandsire: Musket (GB)
- Dam: Aida (NZ)
- Damsire: Leolinus (GB)
- Foaled: 1893
- Country: New Zealand
- Colour: Brown
- Owner: J J Russell

Major wins
- Auckland Cup (1898); ARC Handicap (1898)
- Last updated on 30 October 2025

Uhlan was a New Zealand thoroughbred horse that won the Boxing Day 1898 Auckland Cup.

W H Bartlett filmed Uhlan winning the Auckland Cup at Ellerslie Racecourse for the entrepreneur Alfred Henry Whitehouse. This was the first time a horse race had been filmed in New Zealand.

== Principal race wins ==
- 1898 Auckland Cup
- 1898 ARC Handicap

== See also ==
- Thoroughbred racing in New Zealand
