= One Hundred and Forty Days Under the World =

1964 film

- Produced by: Oxley Hughan; Geoffrey Scott
- Production company: National Film Unit
- Release date: 1964
- Country: New Zealand
- Language: English

The full film

One Hundred and Forty Days Under the World is a 1964 New Zealand short documentary film about Antarctica. It was nominated for an Academy Award for Best Documentary Short.
