= Pecking Order (film) =

2017 documentary film

Pecking Order is a 2017 New Zealand comedy documentary film about competitive poultry showing by Slavko Martinov. The film was shot primarily in Christchurch, New Zealand. It opened theatrically in New Zealand on 18 May 2017 and on 29 September 2017 in UK and Ireland.

== Release ==
The film had its world premiere on 29 April 2017 at the 2017 Hot Docs Canadian International Documentary Festival. The film had its New Zealand premiere in Christchurch (at Hoyts in their Riccarton theatre) on 9 May 2017, before its nationwide theatrical release on 18 May 2017.

== Reception ==
On Rotten Tomatoes the film has an approval rate of 95% based on reviews from 20 critics.

Francesca Rudkin of The New Zealand Herald gave the film four (out of five) stars, describing it as "a heartwarming Kiwi classic". Fionnuala Halligan of Screen Daily called the film "a feathered real life tribute to Best in Show" and "an affectionate crowdpleaser".
