= Uhlan winning the Auckland Cup at Ellerslie Racecourse =

First filming of a New Zealand horse race

- Based on: Documentary
- Produced by: Alfred Henry Whitehouse
- Cinematography: W. H. Bartlett
- Distributed by: Alfred Henry Whitehouse
- Release date: December 1898
- Running time: 1250 frames
- Country: New Zealand
- Language: Silent

Uhlan winning the Auckland Cup at Ellerslie Racecourse was an 1898 New Zealand sports documentary film.

W. H. Bartlett was employed by Alfred Henry Whitehouse to film the Auckland Cup at Ellerslie Racecourse on Boxing Day 1898, the race being won by Uhlan.

== Synopsis ==
The silent film shows the field of horses galloping up the strait and past the judge's box, Uhlan being led up and weighed in, the crowd on the grandstand, and Uhlan's excited owner being restrained from rushing onto the course.
