= Spooked (film) =

- Directed by: Geoff Murphy
- Written by: Geoff Murphy
- Starring: Cliff Curtis; Ian Mune; Christopher Hobbs; Peter Elliot
- Edited by: Michael J. Horton
- Music by: John Charles
- Production company: New Zealand Film Commission
- Distributed by: New Zealand Film Commission
- Release date: 2004
- Running time: 94 minutes
- Country: New Zealand
- Language: English
- Budget: $1,000,000
- Box office: $31,460

Spooked is a 2004 New Zealand film directed by Geoff Murphy and loosely based on Ian Wishart's novel The Paradise Conspiracy, which itself is based on actual events in New Zealand. Partly funded by the New Zealand Film Commission, Spooked had its first screenings in the market at the 2004 Cannes Film Festival where it was first reviewed. The film performed poorly at the box office after some negative reviews despite its cast of prominent New Zealand actors.

== Plot ==
Investigative journalist Mort Whitman (Cliff Curtis) is onto the story of his lifetime, the most important story in the nation. It was huge, involving a big payoff from a multinational bank to a second-hand computer dealer Kevin Jones (Christopher Hobbs). Tracing the days leading up to Kevin's suspicious death, Mort reveals Kevin's increasing paranoia and erratic behaviour through the eyes of his best mate Jimmy Blick (John Leigh) and girlfriend Ruby Elder (Miriama Smith). What dangerous secrets had he stumbled upon? Did the forces - private security, police, SIS or CIA - that increasingly menaced his life, kill him? Or did he simply drink too much and crash his car? Mort is determined to get to the bottom of it if it kills him.

== Cast ==
Actor	Role
Cliff Curtis	Mort Whitman
Christopher Hobbs	Kevin Jones
Ian Mune	Dave Johnson
Miriama Smith	Ruby Elder
Peter Elliot	Randy Fox
Alison Bruce	Sheila Miller
Mark Ferguson	Bill Roberts
Kevin J. Wilson	Mike Taylor
Geoff Dolan	Simmonds
