= Craig Harrison (writer) =

British-New Zealand fantasy writer

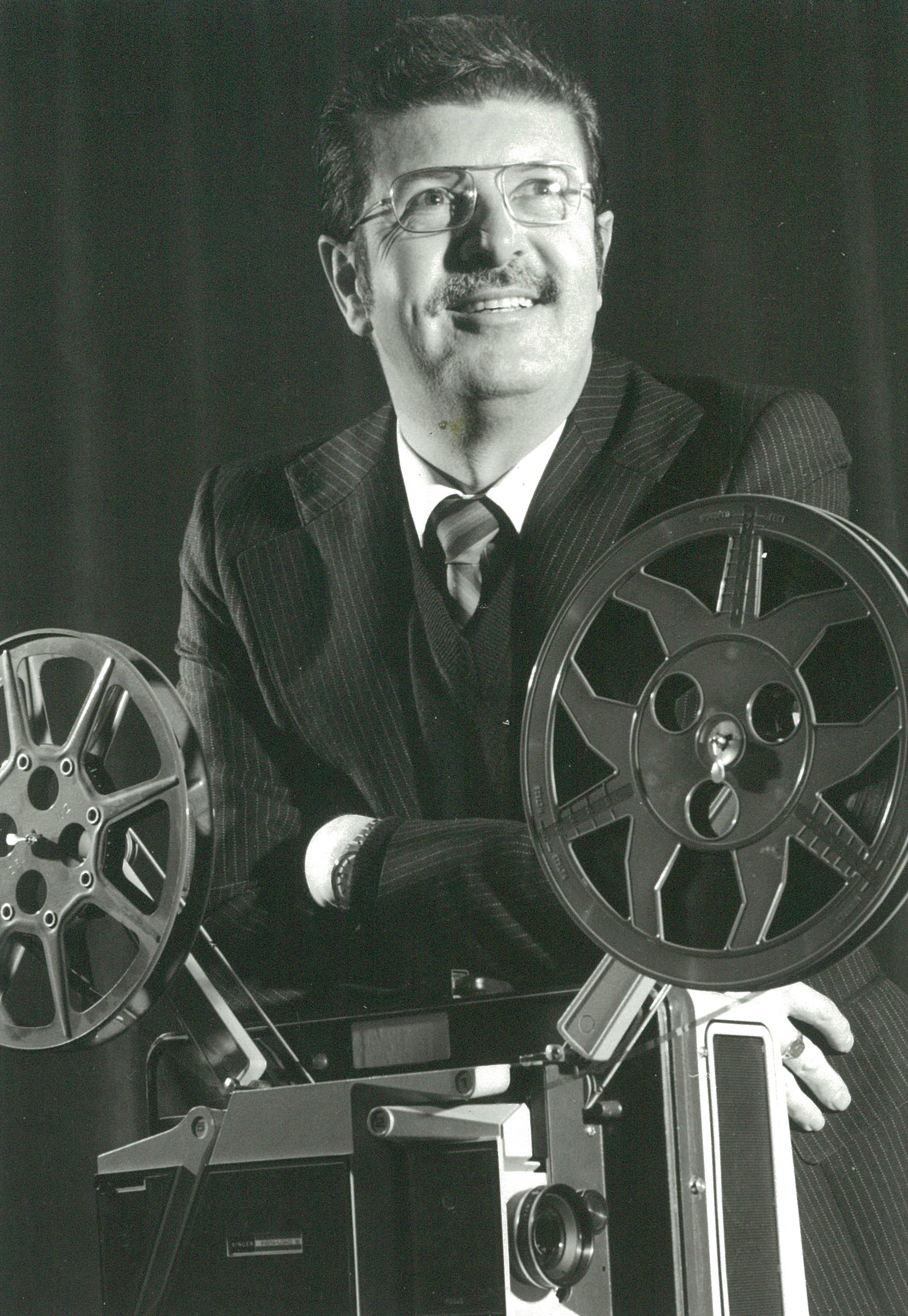
- Harrison in 1985
- Born: 1942 (age 83–84); Leeds, United Kingdom
- Occupations: Author, playwright, lecturer

Craig Harrison (born 1942 in Leeds, Yorkshire) is a British-New Zealand author, playwright, scriptwriter, and retired university lecturer for art history and film studies at Massey University. He is best known for his 1982 novel The Quiet Earth. Harrison's output has ranged from science fiction to junior fiction, to comedies parodying academia. All of his books were first published in New Zealand.

== Bibliography ==
=== Novels ===
- How To Be A Pom (1975)
- Broken October: New Zealand, 1985 (1976 A.H. and A.W. Reed Ltd) – Novelisation of the play 'Tomorrow Will Be A Lovely Day' ISBN 0589009664
- The Quiet Earth (1981 – Coronet Books) ISBN 0340265078
- Ground Level (1981) – Novelization of earlier play 'Ground Level'
- Days of Starlight (1988), ISBN 0340422033
- Grievous Bodily (1991)
- The Dumpster Saga (2007)

=== Plays ===
- Tomorrow Will Be a Lovely Day (1974)
- Ground Level (1981)
- The Whites of Their Eyes (1975)
- Perfect Strangers (1976)
- Hearts of Gold (1983)
- White Lies (1994)
