= Glorious New Zealand =

1925 New Zealand documentary film

- Directed by: Arthur H Messenger
- Produced by: Arthur H Messenger
- Cinematography: Herbert Howard Moulton Bridgman
- Production company: New Zealand Government Publicity Office
- Release date: 1925
- Running time: 13 minutes
- Country: New Zealand
- Languages: Silent; English intertitles

Glorious New Zealand is a 1925 New Zealand silent documentary film directed by Arthur Messenger. It was billed as “the most beautiful N.Z. picture ever”.

== Production ==
This film was produced by Arthur Messenger for the New Zealand Government Publicity Office.
