= George Tarr =

George Herrmann Tarr (1881–1968) was a New Zealand actor, scenic artist, theatre manager and film-maker. He was born in Sydney, New South Wales, Australia; and died in Milford, Auckland, New Zealand.

After a career as a child actor from the age of five, he came to New Zealand about 1902. He worked on establishing cinemas before moving into film production in 1914. He produced two major films: Hinemoa (1914) and Ten Thousand Miles in the Southern Cross (1922).

Tarr did not continue with film-making, and became a theatrical actor, producer and scenic artist.
