= Bread and Roses (1993 film) =

1993 New Zealand biographical film

- Directed by: Gaylene Preston
- Written by: Graeme Tetley; Gaylene Preston
- Based on: Sonja Davies autobiography
- Produced by: Robin Laing
- Starring: Geneviève Picot; Mick Rose; Perry Piercy
- Cinematography: Alun Bollinger
- Edited by: Paul Sutorius
- Music by: John Charles
- Production company: Preston*Laing Productions
- Release date: July 18, 1993
- Running time: 195 minutes
- Language: English
- Budget: $NZ 3 million

Bread and Roses is a 1993 biographical film showing significant episodes in the political life of socialist and feminist Sonja Davies, based on her autobiography of the same name. She is portrayed from her early years to her election to the Nelson Hospital Board. Made as a Suffrage Year tribute to the women of New Zealand. Helen Martin says the film is fascinating as a social history, showing her empathy with working class women. The film was shown on television in four episodes in October 1993.

== Cast ==
- Geneviève Picot as Sonya Davies
- Perry Piercy as Megaphone Woman
- Donna Akersten as Mrs Mackersey (Sonja's mother)
- Doug Aston as Vern (rural driver)
- Jo Briant as Barbara
- Eddie Campbell as Dr Wilson (tuberculosis doctor)
- Sarah Cathie as Penny (as young child)
- Janet Fisher as Ruth Page (railways protest leader)
- Raymond Hawthorne as Mr Mackersey (Sonja's father)
- Emma Hazlewood as Penny (as child)
- Theresa Healey as Peggy
- Ralph Johnson as Inspector Thompson
- Ross Jolly as Dr Speedie (visiting medical inspector)
- Francis Kewene as Maisie
- William Kircher as Stan Whitehead
- Barbara Laurenson as Home Nurse (Wellington)
- Glyn Mabbitt as Foreman at railway station
- Larissa Matheson as Dot
- Carmel McGlone as Maternity nurse, as Sonja's maternity nurse
- David McKenzie as Magistrate
- Mandy McMullin as Lyn (railways protester)
- Katherine McRae as Syd
- Joanne Mildenhall as Anne (railways protester)
- Helen Moulder as Miss Grant (visiting medical inspector)
- Meredith Parker as Young Sonja
- Emily Perkins as Joan
- Vivienne Plumb as Unhelpful Post Office Clerk
- Kathryn Rawlings as Les Barlett (railways protester)
- Tina Regtien as Con (friend of Sonja)
- Mick Rose as Charlie
- Joanne Simpson as Pregnant Woman (Mrs Jeffers)
- Carol Smith as Cath
- David Telford as Superintendent Carron
- Erik Thomson as Red
- William Walker as Wally
- Susan Wilson as Head Nurse (Ōtaki)
- Mark Wright as Mr Jeffers
- Francis Bell as Dr Alexander (Unsympathetic Medical Superintendent)
