= Ten Thousand Miles in the Southern Cross =

1922 film by George Herrmann Tarr

- Directed by: George Tarr
- Release date: 1922
- Language: English

Ten Thousand Miles in the Southern Cross is a 1922 New Zealand travelogue made by George Tarr during a 1922 voyage in the South Pacific. Most shots are of indigenous tribes e.g. ritual dances, though one is of a bishop in full canonical regalia, presumably at a Melanesian mission. Most of the shots are wide shots, with less than 10% close-ups, including one of a small child smoking a cigarette with tears running down his cheeks.

Originally thought lost, 16 minutes of the film were found in Australia in 1995. This part was shot in the Solomon Islands and four other Melanesian locations. On a poster the title is "10,000 miles in the S.Y. Southern Cross" (S.Y. presumably for Steam Yacht), and says "A wonderful trip to the sea girt islands of the Western Pacific". Sam Edwards says "Tarr’s images leave the viewer with a satisfying sense both of freshness and enlightenment".
