= The Quiet Earth (film) =

- Directed by: Geoff Murphy
- Screenplay by: Bill Baer; Bruno Lawrence; Sam Pillsbury
- Based on: The Quiet Earth by Craig Harrison
- Produced by: Sam Pillsbury; Don Reynolds
- Starring: Bruno Lawrence; Alison Routledge; Peter Smith
- Cinematography: James Bartle
- Edited by: Michael J. Horton
- Music by: John Charles
- Release date: 18 October 1985 (US)
- Running time: 91 minutes
- Country: New Zealand
- Language: English
- Budget: $3 million
- Box office: NZ$600,000 (New Zealand)

The Quiet Earth is a 1985 New Zealand post-apocalyptic science fiction film directed by Geoff Murphy and starring Bruno Lawrence, Alison Routledge and Peter Smith as three survivors of a cataclysmic disaster. It is loosely based on the 1981 science fiction novel of the same name by Craig Harrison. Other sources of inspiration have been suggested: the 1954 novel I Am Legend, Dawn of the Dead, and especially the 1959 film The World, the Flesh and the Devil, of which it has been called an unofficial remake.

== Plot ==
On July 5, a mysterious phenomenon briefly darkens the sky over Hamilton, New Zealand. Zac Hobson, a scientist working on Project Flashlight (an experiment designed to create a wireless global energy grid), awakens to find all radio transmissions silent. He soon discovers that humanity has vanished, evidenced by deserted cities and the wreckage of a passenger plane with no bodies.

At his laboratory, Zac finds his superior Perrin dead and a message indicating that Project Flashlight has been completed. Concluding that the experiment caused the mass disappearance, which he calls “The Effect,” Zac narrowly escapes the lab's automated radiation lockdown. Believing himself to be the last person on Earth, he struggles with isolation and mental instability before gradually regaining composure.

Zac later encounters two other survivors: Joanne and Api. They deduce that they survived because each was momentarily clinically dead when the Effect occurred. As the three form a fragile community, Zac discovers that universal physical constants are destabilising, causing the Sun to become increasingly volatile. Fearing a second catastrophe, they decide to destroy the Flashlight facility.

Zac ultimately sacrifices himself by detonating explosives at the installation just as another Effect occurs. He awakens alone on a strange beach beneath unfamiliar skies, watching a massive ringed planet rise above the horizon, uncertain of his fate or reality.

== Cast ==
- Bruno Lawrence as Zac Hobson
- Alison Routledge as Joanne
- Pete Smith as Api

== Analysis ==
The precise meaning of the final scene is left to the audience. In his commentary on the Umbrella Entertainment DVD release, writer/producer Sam Pillsbury states, "...we all thought it was quite simple; I mean, our intention was just that, what happened was, he died at the moment of the effect for a second time and he's now found himself in another world, what the hell's he gonna do...", he then says, more or less jokingly, that director Geoff Murphy being "a Catholic or lapsed Catholic, [it] may well have been something to do with purgatory, and y'know, you being trapped in cyclical and going back into having to relive your thing until you work out your karma, [something; possibly 'if I'm not'] mixing my metaphors; anyway, enigmatic is good, I think, to a certain extent..."

== Reception ==
Walter Goodman of The New York Times wrote, "...it's easy to watch most of the time and never positively painful." Variety wrote, "One of New Zealand's top directors, Geoff Murphy has taken a man-alone theme and turned it imaginatively to strong and refreshing effect in The Quiet Earth." Sheila Benson of the Los Angeles Times called Lawrence's screen presence "electrifying".

It has since become a cult film. In 2014, astrophysicist Neil deGrasse Tyson named it one of his favourite science fiction films. The film placed tenth in a 2014 public poll by Stuff.co.nz of the best New Zealand films of all time.
