= Gaylene Preston =

New Zealand filmmaker (born 1947)

Dame Gaylene Preston DNZM
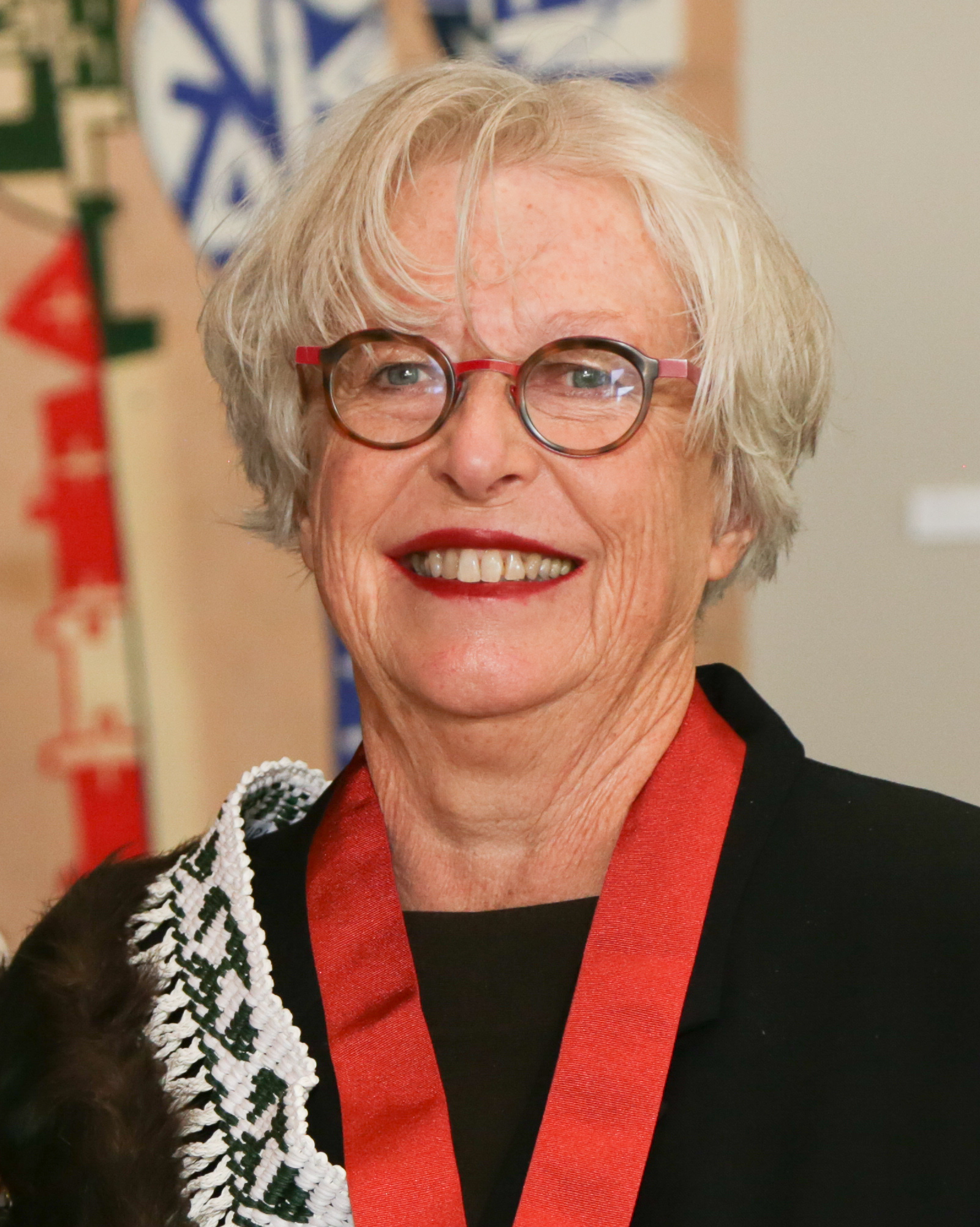
- Preston in 2019
- Born: Gaylene Mary Preston; 1 June 1947 (age 79); Greymouth, New Zealand
- Occupations: Film director, film producer
- Known for: documentary films
- Relatives: Chelsie Preston Crayford (daughter); Jan Preston (sister)

Dame Gaylene Mary Preston DNZM (born 1 June 1947) is a New Zealand filmmaker with a particular interest in documentary films.

== Early life and family ==
Born in Greymouth on 1 June 1947, Preston was educated at Colenso High School (now William Colenso College) in Napier. She went on to study at the Ilam School of Fine Arts at the University of Canterbury from 1966 to 1968, and then the St Albans School of Fine Art in Hertfordshire, England, where she completed a Diploma of Art Therapy in 1974.

Preston's sister is the pianist and songwriter Jan Preston. She has one daughter, the actor Chelsie Preston Crayford, who was born in 1987.

== Career ==
Preston's first film was All The Way Up There (1979). As a producer she has contributed to the award-winning feature documentaries Punitive Damage (1999) and Coffee, Tea or Me? (2001) and Lands of our Fathers (executive producer). Her feature film Home By Christmas was a dramatised oral history based on her father's memories of his wartime experiences, contrasted with her mother's perspective. The music for the film was composed by her sister Jan Preston.

Her other feature films include Mr Wrong, Ruby and Rata, and the mini series Bread & Roses (with producer Robin Laing). She was writer, director and producer of Perfect Strangers, a black comedy starring Sam Neill and Rachael Blake. In 1982 Gaylene directed a documentary called Making Utu about the making of Geoff Murphy's feature Utu.

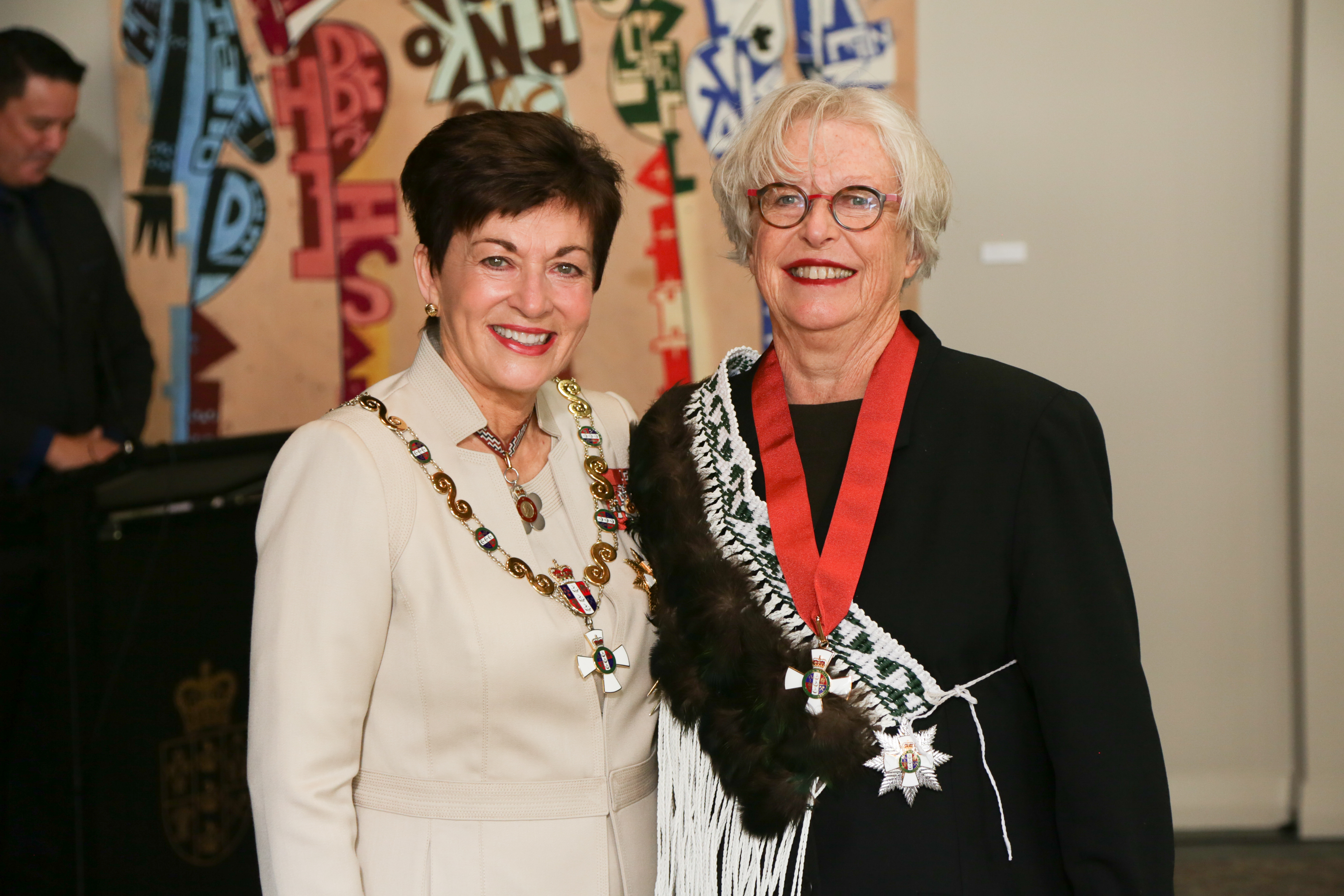
Preston (right), after her investiture as a Dame Companion of the New Zealand Order of Merit by the governor-general, Dame Patsy Reddy, at Government House, Auckland, on 15 May 2019

Preston chaired the Academy of Film and Television Arts (1997–99) and was a member of the board of the NZ Film Commission (1979–85) as well as chair of the Film Innovation Fund (1981–85). She has been a member of the Board of New Zealand On Air (The NZ Broadcasting Commission), and in 2001 she was the first filmmaker to be made a Laureate by the New Zealand Arts Foundation, recognising her contribution to New Zealand film and television.

In the 2002 New Year Honours, Preston was appointed an Officer of the New Zealand Order of Merit, for services to film making, and in 2016, she received the New Zealand Women of Influence Award for Arts and Culture in recognition of her work on New Zealand-focused films and documentaries.

In May 2011 she publicly protested plans for Wellington Airport to erect a Wellywood sign on the hill beside the Miramar Cutting, the highest-profile industry opponent of this initiative.

Preston was awarded the Lia Award at the Stranger with my Face film festival in Tasmania in 2017. The award recognises an influential and innovative figure in the field of genre storytelling. At the festival they screened Preston's films Mr. Wrong and Perfect Strangers, which were reviewed in depth by Lauren Carroll Harris for RealTime.

She wrote, directed and produced Hope and Wire (2014) a drama mini series about the aftermath of the 2010/2011 Christchurch earthquakes.

Preston's documentary feature film My Year with Helen (2017) premiered at the Athena Film Festival in February 2018.

Preston's most recent documentary feature Grace: A Prayer For Peace (2025) debuted at the New Zealand International Film Festival in 2025.

In the 2019 New Year Honours, Preston was appointed a Dame Companion of the New Zealand Order of Merit, for services to film. In 2025, she was awarded an honorary Doctor of Letters by the University of Canterbury.

== See also ==
- List of honorary doctors of the University of Canterbury
