= Hamish Bennett (director) =

New Zealand filmmaker and screenwriter

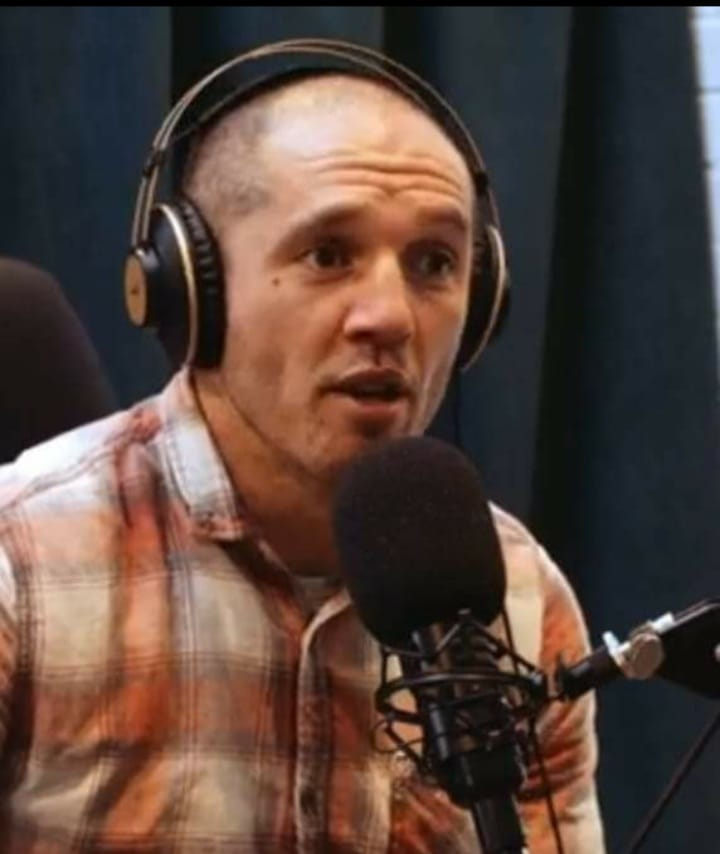
- Hamish Bennett in 2019
- Born: 1978 (age 47–48); New Zealand
- Occupations: Screenwriter; director
- Known for: Bellbird; Uproar

Hamish Bennett is a New Zealand filmmaker born in 1978. He is best known for writing and directing the critically acclaimed film Bellbird (2019). His second film Uproar was released in 2023.

== Early life and education ==
Bennett is of Māori descent, of the Ngāti Whakaue, Patuharakeke and Kati Waewae peoples. He grew up in a small rural town in Northland.

He earned a BA at Massey University in 1998, majoring in English and Media Studies at the Manawatū, and played rugby for Manawatū in 1998 and 1999. His elder brother, Simon, is a psychology lecturer at the university. As of 2019, Hamish was working full-time as a school teacher. Hamish now has two children: Tai and Leo Bennett.

== Career ==
Bennett's first short film, The Dump (2012), won Best Short Script at the NZ Writers Guild Awards in 2012.

Hi second short film, Ross & Beth (2014), won many awards, including the Jury and Audience prizes at the 2014 New Zealand International Film Festival.

His first feature film, Bellbird, had its world premiere at the Sydney Film Festival in 2019, won an audience award at the Melbourne International Film Festival and screened in the New Zealand International Film Festival as well as other international film festivals. It screened at Palmerston North on 20 October 2019, as a preview before its nationwide release on 7 November, screening at 70 cinemas around the country. Bellbird won the Jury Grand Prix at the 2021 Antipodean Film Festival in Saint Tropez, France.

He co-directed his second film Uproar with Paul Middleditch. Uproar was released in October 2023, to glowing reviews.

He also served as a writer for the 2025 Three TV series Tangata Pai.
