= This Is New Zealand =

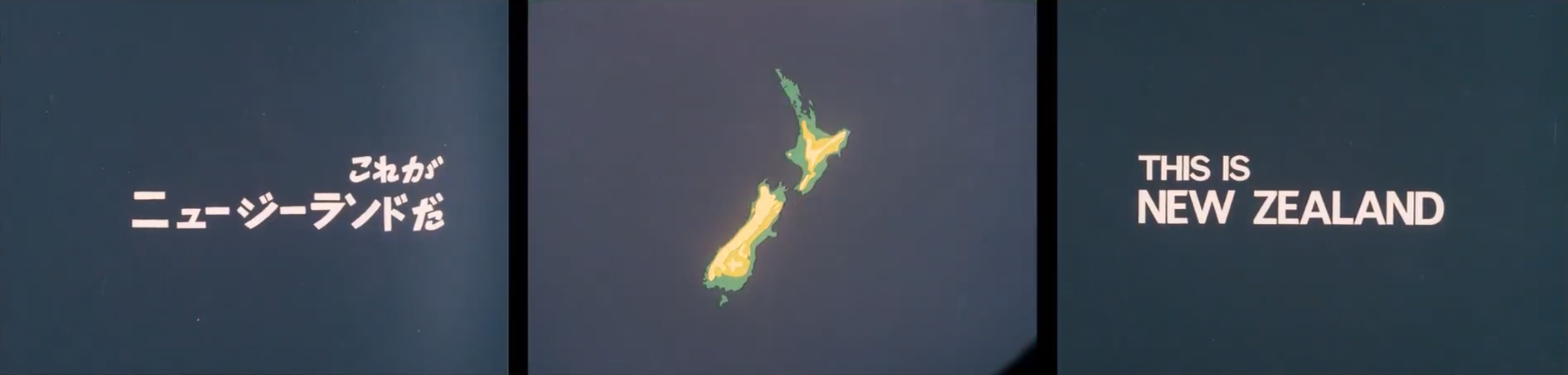
- Directed by: Hugh Macdonald
- Written by: Dave Jordan; Hugh Macdonald
- Produced by: Ron Bowie; David H. Fowler
- Production company: New Zealand National Film Unit
- Distributed by: Hugh Macdonald Films
- Release date: March 19, 1970 (New Zealand)
- Running time: 21 minutes
- Country: New Zealand
- Language: English
- Box office: NZD 150,000

This is New Zealand is a documentary film showcasing New Zealand scenery that was produced by the New Zealand National Film Unit for screening at the World Expo in Osaka in 1970.

The film combined scenic images including aerial cinematography with rousing classical music such as Sibelius' Karelia Suite. Using then ground-breaking technology, the film required three separate but synchronised 35mm film projectors which projected their images onto an extra-wide screen.

In 2007, Archives New Zealand commissioned a restoration at post-production facility, Park Road Post. Hugh Macdonald, the film's original director, was involved in the restoration, as well as the original sound mixer Kit Rollings. The remastered film was released for sale on DVD in 2014.

== Production ==
Production of the film by New Zealand's National Film Unit took place prior to the 1970 World Expo in Osaka, Japan. The film was intended to be shown in the New Zealand pavilion at the Expo, and was commissioned as a promotional tool for the nation, directed towards the Japanese audience at the event.

Directed by New Zealand filmmaker Hugh Macdonald, This is New Zealand was designed to be projected onto three separate screens making up one widescreen display. The production team used three attached cameras to allow for certain scenes that needed to be displayed across the separate projections simultaneously.

== Summary ==
External videos
- This Is New Zealand (1970), Archives New Zealand

Intended to provide an insight into New Zealand's environment and culture for promotional purposes, This is New Zealand includes a variety of images of the nation's natural landscapes, cities, events, and people throughout its 21-minute duration.

The included images focus on areas and events from across the country, including videos of native flora, the Southern Alps, beaches, countryside and major cities. The film also includes images of New Zealand's agricultural production and examples of the various professions of its people, such as dentists and lawyers at work. The videos and images shown vary greatly in nature, including a large number of moving, aerial shots, as well as historical photographs.

The soundtrack for the film includes music from the Hamilton County Bluegrass Band, Acme Sausage Company, and New Zealand rock band The Avengers. Also included are excerpts of Jean Sibelius’ Karelia Suite as performed by Manchester's Halle Orchestra.

== Release ==
The film was initially released in Osaka, Japan, during the World Expo 1970, where it remained on display in the New Zealand pavilion for over six months and was seen by two million viewers. It was subsequently released in New Zealand in 1971 to four cinemas, where it was seen by over 400,000 people.

In 2007, to allow for showings at modern cinemas, Archives New Zealand, led by original director Hugh Macdonald, commissioned the restoration and remaster of the original film at Park Road Post in Wellington, with the soundtrack also being updated by Kit Rollings, who worked on the original 1970 release. In the same year, this remastered version of This is New Zealand was shown to the public for the first time during the New Zealand International Film Festival. The remastered version was subsequently awarded a bronze medal in the New York Festivals Film and Video Competition.

== Awards and recognition ==
The remastered edition of the film won the bronze world medal at the New York Festivals Film and Video Competition in 2007.

The film's master reels are stored at Archives New Zealand. In 2022, these reels were inscribed on the UNESCO Memory of the World Aotearoa New Zealand Ngā Mahara o te Ao register.
