= Alfred Henry Whitehouse =

Alfred Henry Whitehouse (15 September 1856 – 7 April 1929) was a notable New Zealand motion picture exhibitor and producer. He was born in Birmingham, Warwickshire, England, in 1856.

Whitehouse produced the earliest New Zealand films starting on the first of December 1898, when he shot a silent documentary on the Opening of the Auckland Industrial and Mining Exhibition. His second film, shot on Boxing Day that year, was Uhlan winning the Auckland Cup at Ellerslie Racecourse. In 1895, Whitehouse became the first person to exhibit motion pictures in New Zealand by using the Edison kinetoscopes. In 1898, Whitehouse imported a camera and employed photographer W. H. Bartlett to operate the camera. By mid-1900, Whitehouse had produced about 10 films.

== Personal ==
Whitehouse was born in 1856 at Birmingham, Warwickshire, England, to Abel Whitehouse and Matilda (Craddock). He married Eliza Davis at Auckland in 1878. Eliza died in 1888, leaving Alfred with five children. In 1897 he married Ada Baker. Ada died in 1910 and Whitehouse died in 1929. He was survived by two sons and a daughter.
