= Alun Bollinger =

New Zealand cinematographer

Alun Robert Bollinger MNZM (born 1948) is a New Zealand cinematographer, who has worked on several Peter Jackson films, and many other films in New Zealand. He has also been a Director of Photography, including the second unit for Peter Jackson's trilogy The Lord of the Rings. He started as a trainee cine-camera operator for television with the New Zealand Broadcasting Corporation in 1966.

In the 2005 Queen's Birthday Honours, Bollinger was appointed a Member of the New Zealand Order of Merit, for services to cinematography.

A documentary released in 2008, Barefoot Cinema: The Art and Life of Cinematographer Alun Bollinger, turns the camera 180 degrees and looks at Bollinger's work and life.

He lives at Blacks Point, near Reefton on the West Coast of New Zealand, with his wife Helen.

== Selected filmography ==
Cinematographer

- 1974: Uenuku the mist maiden
- 1977: Wild Man
- 1977: Dagg Day Afternoon
- 1978: Charlie Horse
- 1980: Beyond Reasonable Doubt
- 1981: Goodbye Pork Pie
- 1982: Patu!
- 1983: The Making of Utu
- 1984: Vigil
- 1985: Came a Hot Friday
- 1986: For Love Alone (Australia)
- 1994: Heavenly Creatures
- 1995: Forgotten Silver
- 1995: Cinema of Unease
- 1996: The Frighteners
- 2003: Perfect Strangers
- 2004: Oyster Farmer (Australia)
- 2005: River Queen
- 2007: Lovely Rita
- 2010: Matariki
- 2017: The Stolen
