= National Film Unit =

New Zealand state-owned film production company

Logo of NZ National Film Unit

The National Film Unit (NFU) was a state-owned film production organisation originally based in Miramar, New Zealand. Founded in 1936 when the government took over Filmcraft, a private film studio, the NFU produced newsreels, documentaries and promotional films about New Zealand, and for many years was the only significant film production facility in the country. Many people who became prominent in the development of the modern New Zealand film industry were trained by the NFU; for example, the actor Sam Neill started at the NFU as a director.

During World War II, the NFU had a brief to provide war-time information and propaganda to further the war effort. The NFU produced the Weekly Review, a weekly magazine-style film journal that was distributed free to New Zealand's cinemas. Other productions included short documentaries about the war effort.

After the end of the war in 1945, the NFU continued with a renewed focus on educational film for domestic audiences as well as the projection of a favourable image of New Zealand overseas, particularly for tourism promotion, and, to a lesser extent, to attract immigrants and investment, and to further trade. Notable NFU films produced during this period were Te Rauparaha about the Maori chief, Snows of Aorangi (nominated for an Oscar in 1958), One Hundred and Forty Days Under the World (nominated for an Oscar in 1964), A Deaf Child in the Family, Amazing New Zealand (1963), and the three-projector wide-screen This is New Zealand for Expo '70 at Osaka, Japan.

In 1977, the NFU and Television New Zealand co-produced The Governor, a television docudrama about Sir George Grey.

When the NFU was privatised in the 1990s, it was purchased by TVNZ for NZ$3 million. In 1999 TVNZ sold the NFU studios in Lower Hutt to film-maker Peter Jackson. Jackson later moved the facility to Park Road Post in Miramar.

In 2011, the National Film Unit-produced titles Weekly Reviews (1941–50) and Pictorial Parades (1952–71), weekly news bulletins shown before films at picture theatres, were included as an entry on the UNESCO Memory of the World Aotearoa New Zealand Ngā Mahara o te Ao register.

== See also ==
- Park Road Post
