= Alger Park/Ash Creek, Dallas =

Alger Park and Ash Creek are two adjacent but separately developed and distinct residential neighborhoods in Dallas, Texas that today are joined as a single neighborhood association and allied crime watch.

== Alger Park ==
Plans for Alger Park were announced in September 1950 (74 years ago) by Dallas real estate developer and later United States Congressman Bruce Alger. The subdivision was announced as a 180-lot subdivision with deed restrictions requiring homes to be of masonry construction and not less than 1,000 square feet (93 m^{2}) in floor space. Initial price ranges of homes were $11,000 to $14,000. Alger Park was advertised as adjoining Casa Linda Estates and extending from Peavy Road toward Buckner Boulevard, near the Reinhardt school of DISD. Streets were 31 feet (9.4 m) wide and connected by a system of 15-foot (4.6 m) alleys. Streets were curbed. Engineer O.R. "Chick" McElya was retained to assist in designing of the project.

The project territory was originally in unincorporated Dallas County, Texas, not within the city limits of Dallas. It was annexed by the city of Dallas in October 1950.

The landscaped traffic islands between forked streets that help distinguish the subdivision, such as the one located at Coldwater Circle and Estadaco Drive were originally conceived and developed by the Meadow Gate Garden Club. The project took three years and was completed in 1957. Alger himself, then a United States Congressman, spoke at the dedication and celebratory ceremonies.

== Ash Creek Estates ==
Ash Creek, formally known as Ash Creek Estates, is a subdivision of less than 100 homes bounded by Buckner Boulevard, Mercer Drive, Mariposa Drive, and Ash Creek Drive with the long, narrow lots on Oates Drive serving as the southeastern border of the subdivision.
