= Bom Gillies =

New Zealand soldier (1925–2024)

Sir Bom Gillies KNZM
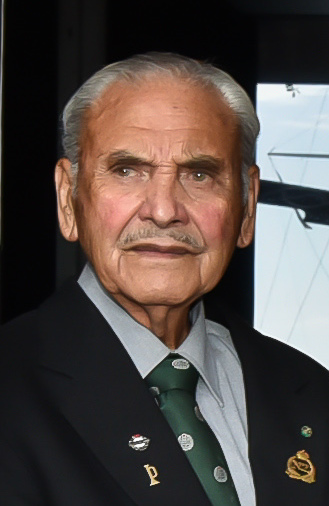
- Gillies in 2020
- Born: Robert Nairn Gillies; 14 February 1925; Hawke's Bay, New Zealand
- Died: 7 November 2024 (aged 99); Rotorua, New Zealand
- Known for: Last surviving member of the Māori Battalion
- Relatives: Maata Horomona (mother)
- Honours: Cavaliere of the Order of Merit of the Italian Republic

Sir Robert Nairn "Bom" Gillies (14 February 1925 – 7 November 2024) was a New Zealand soldier who served with B Company, 28th (Māori) Battalion, during World War II. He was the last surviving member of the Māori Battalion, and was knighted on 31 December 2021.

== Biography ==
Born in Hastings in the Hawke's Bay on 14 February 1925, Gillies was Māori, of Te Arawa, Ngāti Whakaue and Ngāti Kahungunu. His father, Ture Gillies (Ngāti Kahungunu), and mother, Maata Horomona (Te Arawa), moved to Ōhinemutu pā when Robert was six years old when their home in Waimārama was affected by the 1931 Hawke's Bay earthquake. Gillies attended St Mary's Convent on Seddon Street, Rotorua Primary and Rotorua High School.

Gillies attempted twice to enlist in the Māori Battalion, but failed. On his third attempt at age 17, he was successful, giving a false date of birth. In 1943, he left as a private in the 10th Reinforcements, 2nd New Zealand Expeditionary Force, landing in North Africa at the end of the Western Desert campaign. He then fought in the Italian campaign, sustaining injuries at Orsogna. After recovering, he continued serving with the Māori Battalion until the end of the war, including at the Battle of Monte Cassino.

In January 1946, Gillies joined over 700 of the Māori Battalion who sailed aboard the Dominion Monarch into Wellington, returning home.

In his later years, Gillies represented the Māori Battalion at many local, national and international commemorations. He attended the ceremonies in Italy marking the 70th and 75th anniversaries of the Battle of Monte Cassino in 2014 and 2019, and led the celebration on the 75th anniversary of the return of B Company to Rotorua in 2021. Gillies was a trustee of the 28th Māori Battalion B Company History Trust from 2013, and was active in the Te Arawa Returned Services Association.

== Honours ==
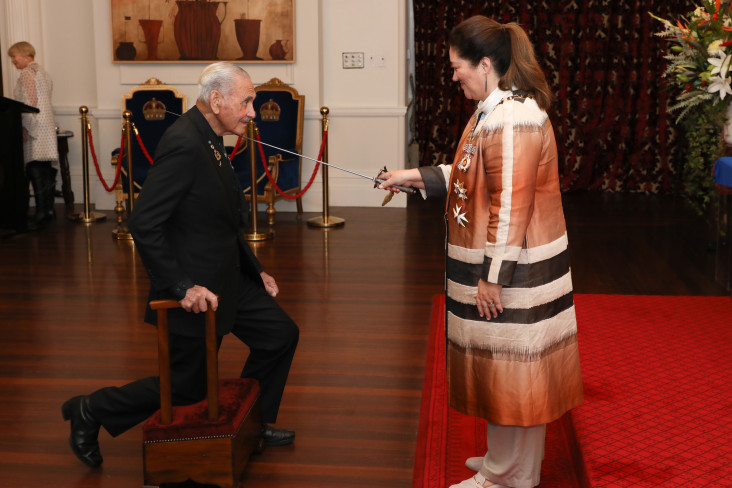
Gillies' investiture as a Knight Companion of the New Zealand Order of Merit by the governor-general, Dame Cindy Kiro, at Government House, Wellington, on 4 May 2022

Gillies was awarded an Italy Star, Africa Star, New Zealand War Service Medal and a War Medal 1939-1945.

In 2009, Gillies was appointed a Cavaliere (Knight) of the Order of Merit of the Italian Republic, which he said he accepted on behalf of the entire Māori Battalion.

In the 2022 New Year Honours, Gillies was appointed a Knight Companion of the New Zealand Order of Merit, for services to Māori and war commemoration. He had previously declined the honour, but accepted it on behalf of all those who had served, saying:

There are many soldiers who did more and who have never been recognised. I accept on behalf of all the boys, all my mates who served in the Māori Battalion. - Bom Gilles

== Later life and death ==
In later life, Gillies expressed regret for Māori participation in the wars, as a result of racism and discrimination in the decades after the war. He is quoted as saying "war is a waste of time. If I had the choice again, I would not fight in that war".

Gillies died in Rotorua on 7 November 2024, at the age of 99. His tangihanga was held at Te Papaiouru Marae in Ōhinemutu. His body was then taken via Tūnohopū Marae to Kauae Cemetery in Ngongotahā, where he was buried alongside his wife.
