= Hinemoa (1913 film) =

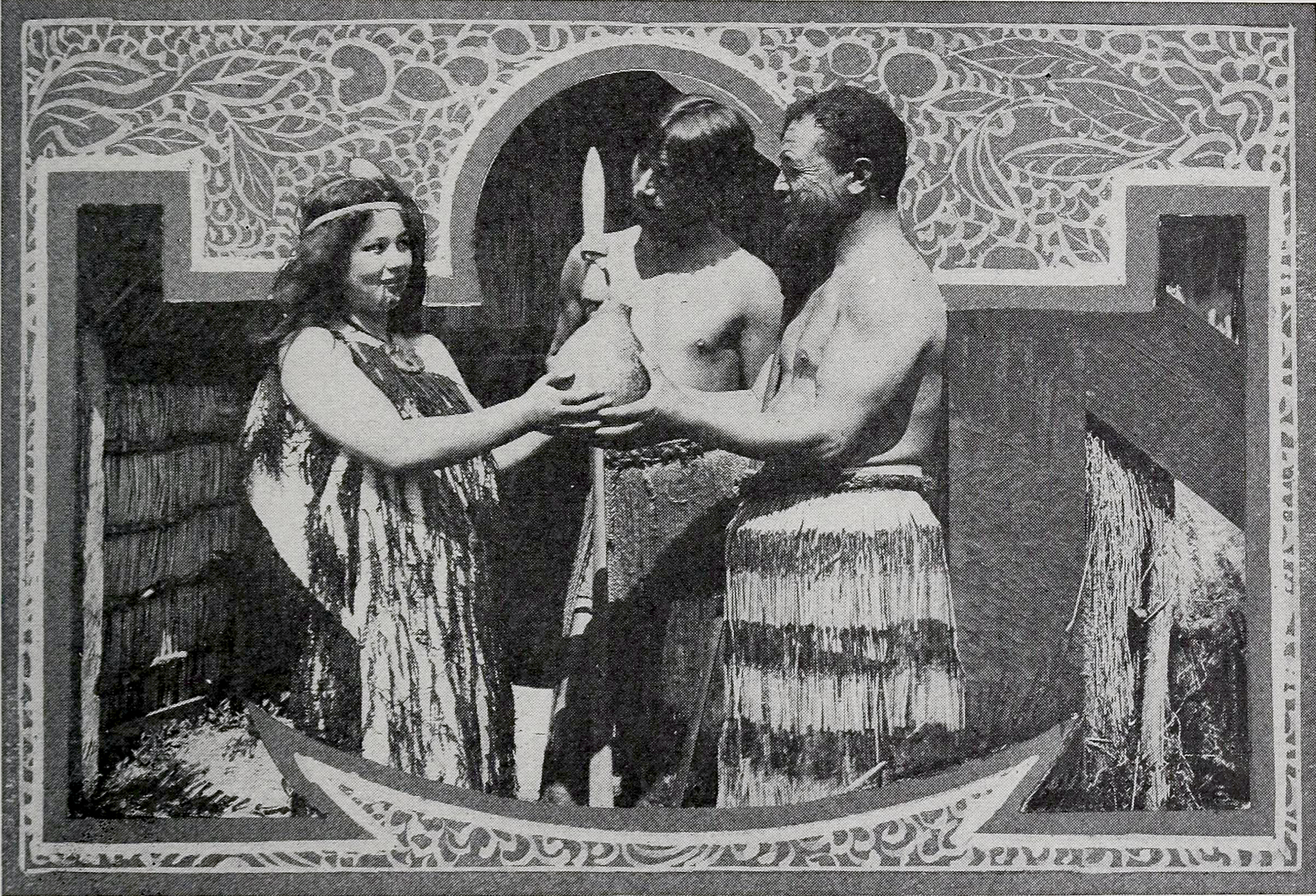
- Directed by: Gaston Méliès
- Written by: Edmund Mitchell
- Produced by: Gaston Méliès
- Starring: Maata Horomona
- Cinematography: George Scott
- Release date: 27 March 1913 (U.S.)
- Running time: 1000 ft or 2 reels ca. 24 minutes
- Countries: France; New Zealand
- Language: silent

Hinemoa is a silent film made in New Zealand by Gaston Méliès in 1913.

It is doubtful whether the film was ever screened in New ’Zealand.

== Plot ==
No known copy of Hinemoa survives, but the film would have told the story of the legend of Hinemoa and Tutanekai.

== Background ==
In 1912, the Méliès brothers' company Star Film was in some financial strife, as a result of which Gaston Méliès travelled to the South Pacific in search of fashionably exotic locales, people and stories.

Hinemoa was one of five two-reel films screened in New York City in 1913; probably including three other 1913 films he shot in New Zealand, Loved by a Maori Chieftess, How Chief Te Ponga Won His Bride and The River Wanganui. As with the three other films, Méliès sent Hinemoa to the United States for post-production treatment, so it is doubtful if any were shown in New Zealand. Several other films shot by Méliès on the expedition failed to survive the tropical humidity.

== See also ==
- Hinemoa – New Zealand produced and released film by George Tarr a year later.
- Maata Horomona
