= How Chief Te Ponga Won His Bride =

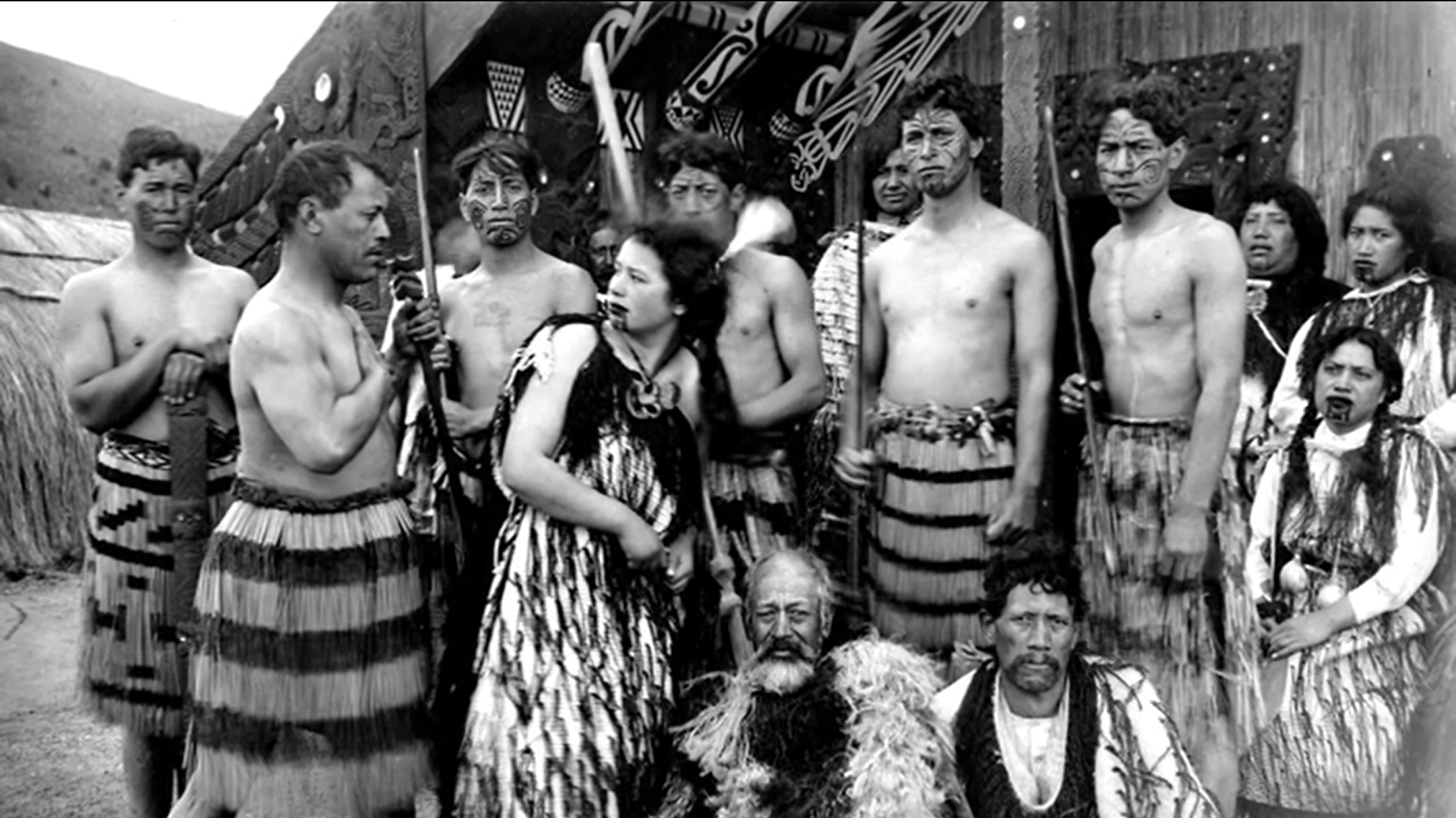
- Promotional still
- Directed by: Gaston Méliès
- Written by: Edmund Mitchell
- Produced by: Gaston Méliès
- Cinematography: George Scott
- Release date: 1913
- Running time: 1000 ft (one reel) c17 min.
- Language: English

How Chief Te Ponga Won His Bride is a 1913 New Zealand silent feature film directed and produced by Gaston Méliès. Principal photography took place in New Zealand. He shot three other films in New Zealand in 1912-13: Hinemoa, Loved by a Maori Chieftess and The River Wanganui. Méliès sent his film to the United States for post-production treatment, so it is doubtful if any were shown in New Zealand.

== Plot ==
The story is set in the Waikato where two Māori tribes are at war, with the story of the love between the young chief Te Ponga and the beautiful Puhuhu, daughter of the rival chief, similar to the legend of Hinemoa and Tutanekai.

== Cast ==
The film was shot in Whakarewarewa, Rotorua with local Māori as cast, including Maata Horomona. No details of the cast survive, although they are probably the same actors as used in the other two films shot by Méliès at this time.
