= Joseph Franklin Wilson =

American politician (1901–1968)

J. Franklin Wilson
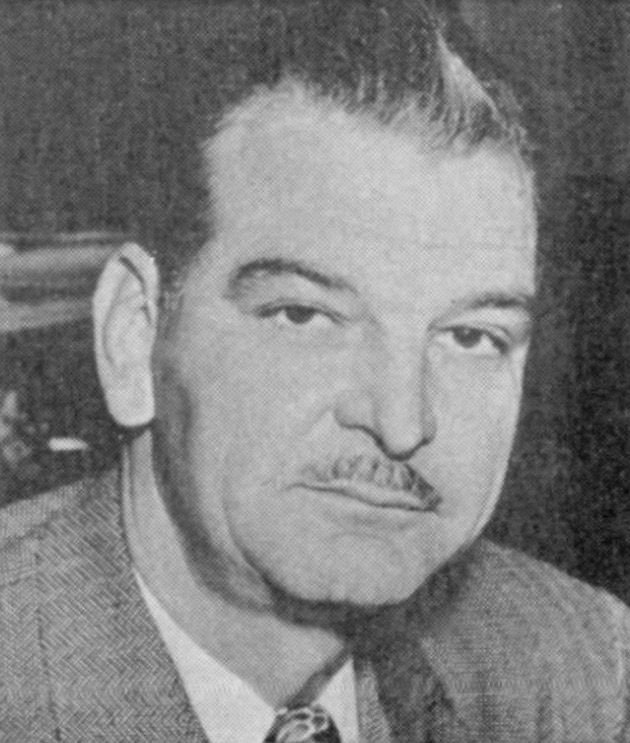

Texas Criminal Court District Judge Dallas County
- In office 1955–1968

Member of the U.S. House of Representatives from Texas's 5th district
- In office January 3, 1947 – January 3, 1955
- Preceded by: Hatton W. Sumners
- Succeeded by: Bruce R. Alger

Texas Criminal Court District Judge Dallas County
- In office 1943–1944

Personal details
- Born: Joseph Franklin Wilson; March 18, 1901 Corsicana, Texas, US
- Died: October 13, 1968 (aged 67) Dallas, Texas, US
- Resting place: Sparkman-Hillcrest Memorial Park Cemetery in Dallas
- Party: Democratic
- Spouse: Ruby Lee Hopkins
- Children: Joseph Franklin Jr; Marion Sue
- Education: Peacock Military Academy Tennessee Military Institute Baylor Law School
- Profession: Lawyer

Joseph Franklin Wilson (March 18, 1901 – October 13, 1968) was an American lawyer, jurist, and politician who served four terms as a U.S. representative from Texas from 1947 to 1955.

== Early years ==
Joseph Franklin Wilson was born in Corsicana, Navarro County, Texas, March 18, 1901.

He attended the elementary school at Corsicana. In 1913, he moved with his family to the Texas Panhandle community of Memphis, Texas in Hall County.

Wilson attended the Memphis public schools until 1916. From September 1917 to June 1918, he was enrolled at Peacock Military College in San Antonio. From September 1918 to June 1919, Wilson attended the Tennessee Military Institute.

=== Legal practice ===
In 1923, Wilson graduated from Baylor Law School in Waco, Texas and was admitted to the bar the same year. Wilson moved to Dallas and began his law practice.

== Public service ==
Wilson was a delegate to the Democratic National Convention in 1936. He was chairman of the Dallas County Democratic Executive Committee from 1942 to 1945.

=== Congress ===
In the 1946 Texas Congressional election, Wilson defeated primary opponent Sarah T. Hughes by 14,000 votes. Hughes years later would administer the oath of office to President Lyndon B. Johnson aboard Air Force One on November 22, 1963. Wilson defeated Republican L.W. Stayart in the 1946 general election. He was re-elected in 1948 by defeating Joe Bailey Irwin. In 1950 and 1952, Wilson ran unopposed for re-election. Wilson was not a candidate for renomination in 1954.

== Judicial career ==
Wilson served as district judge of the criminal district court of Texas in 1943 and 1944, being known as Judge J. Frank Wilson. He was appointed judge of Criminal District Court No. 1, Dallas, Texas, in 1955, in which capacity he served until September 1968. During the Jack Ruby trial in Dallas, Wilson was granted a vacation so that his larger courtroom could accommodate Judge Joe B. Brown for the Ruby Trial. Wilson interrupted his vacation to fill in for the ailing Judge Brown.

== Personal life ==
Wilson married Ruby Lee Hopkins in 1926. The couple had a son Joseph Franklin Wilson Jr, and a daughter Marion Sue.

=== Death ===
He retired due to illness and died in Dallas, Texas, October 13, 1968.

U.S. House of Representatives
Preceded by Hatton W. Sumners	Member of the U.S. House of Representatives from Texas's 5th congressional district 1947–1955	Succeeded by Bruce R. Alger
