= Peacock Military Academy =

- Former names: Peacock's School for Boys
- Motto: Let us do or dee!
- Type: Military, preparatory, secular, single-gender
- Active: September 4, 1894–May 26, 1973
- Chairman: Dr. Wesley Peacock Sr. (1894-1926)
- Superintendent: COL Wesley Peacock Jr. (1926-1973)
- Commandant: BG Donald W. Peacock (1926-1973)
- Location: San Antonio, Texas

The Peacock Military Academy was a college-preparatory school in San Antonio, Texas.

It was founded in 1894 by Wesley Peacock, Sr., who envisioned "the most thorough military school west of the Mississippi, governed by the honor system, and conducted on the principles of a cultured home." The Academy was chartered in 1904 and became one of the first JROTC schools recognized by the Department of War which detailed Colonel George Leroy Brown there as the first commandant of cadets and professor of military science and tactics. Later staff would include future President Dwight D. Eisenhower, Adjutant General Henry Hutchings, Adjutant General Arthur Knickerbocker, Colonel Charles C. Todd, and many other graduates of West Point.

The cavalry branch of the Academy, in Dallas, helped establish the 124th Cavalry Regiment of the Texas National Guard, and the naval branch in Corpus Christi was the first of its kind authorized by Congress. Following World War I, a forerunner of the Department of Veterans Affairs leased the Academy for the rehabilitation of over 5,000 veterans. During World War II, Adjutant General J. Watt Page asked the Academy to conduct a training school for Texas Defense Guard officers. The second Training and Research Unit, "Camp Peacock", was established in October 1942 and succeeded in creating the standard model of training until 1956. In 1956, Adjutant General Kearie Berry asked the Academy to assist in the establishment of a permanent professional military education institute for Texas Military Forces which resulted in the Texas National Guard Academy. Donald Peacock was inducted into the Texas Military Hall of Honor in 1982 for his contributions.

By its closing in 1973, the Peacock Military Academy was nationally recognized as the "West Point of Texas" and had graduated over 15,000 cadets, many of whom served and commanded in World War II and the Korean and Vietnamese campaigns of the Cold War.

== Notable alumni ==
- Paul McDonald Calvo
- Virgilio Elizondo
- King Vidor
- Joseph Franklin Wilson

== Media ==
- The Immortal Alamo

== See also ==
- Marine Military Academy
- TMI Episcopal
