= The River Wanganui =

- Directed by: Gaston Méliès
- Produced by: Gaston Méliès
- Release date: 3 April 1913 (USA)
- Running time: 75 m (246 ft)
- Countries: France; New Zealand
- Language: silent

The River Wanganui is a 1913 silent documentary film shot in New Zealand in 1912 on the 1912–13 South Pacific film-making voyage of French director Gaston Méliès. Like many of his films shot on that trip, it is now presumed to be lost.

The film was released in the US in 1913, and was described then as a "trip up New Zealand’s most picturesque river known as the Rhine of that country." The river is now called the Whanganui River.

In September 1912 press reports said that:

There will be a big Maori gathering shortly at Paranui, a place some 15 miles above Pipiriki, on the Wanganui River, to open a new native meeting-house. Several hundreds of Maoris from all parts of the district are expected to attend. Among the visitors will be the Melies Picture Company, who anticipate finding excellent materials for the kinematograph in the typical Maori scenes.

A later press report in October 1912 said that:

Mr Edmund Mitchell, a well-known novelist and journalist arrived at Wellington from San Francisco by the Aorangi last week with Mr Gaston Melies a moving-picture manufacturer with a full dramatic company on a tour of the Pacific for film-making purposes .... (the Aorangi arrived on 12 September via Rarotonga and Papeete)

The Méliès Company party of 14 (excluding Edmund Mitchell the novelist, who was to write screenplays) left San Francisco on 24 June 1912, and by 4 November 1912 had left New Zealand for Australia. They were in Wellington for a week, and during two weeks in Rotorua they "took many pictures of Maori life, and had several of the most picturesque legends acted before the camera."

Méliès made three feature films in New Zealand during his stay. They are Hinemoa, How Chief Te Ponga Won His Bride and Loved by a Maori Chieftess. Méliès sent his film to the United States for post-production treatment, so it is doubtful if any were shown in New Zealand.

According to Sam Edwards, Méliès made five scenic films and three feature films or dramas in New Zealand. Other 1913 Méliès films about New Zealand from the Internet Movie Database (links below) are:

- A Trip to the Waitomo Caves of New Zealand (documentary)
- A Trip through the North Island of New Zealand, from Auckland to Wellington (documentary)
- In the Land of Fire (drama according to IMDb)
- The Maoris of New Zealand (documentary)
