= The Immortal Alamo =

1911 film directed by William F. Haddock

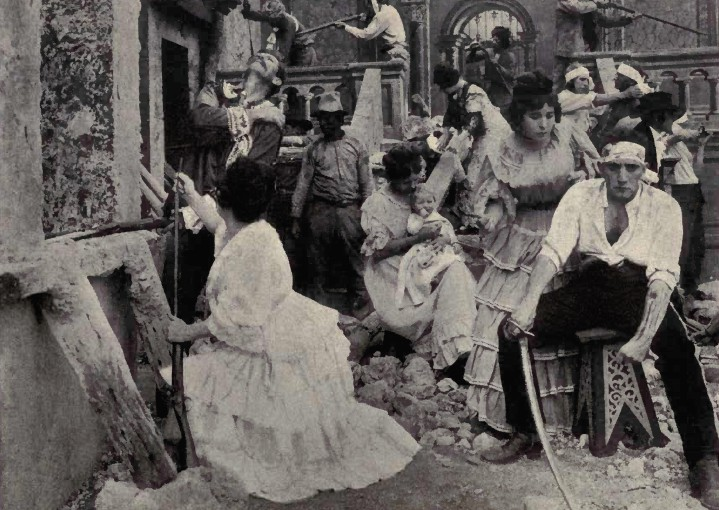
- Still
- Directed by: William F. Haddock
- Written by: Wilbert Melville
- Produced by: Gaston Méliès
- Starring: Francis Ford; Edith Storey; Gaston Méliès; William A. Carroll; William Clifford; Mr. Young
- Distributed by: Star Film Company
- Release date: May 25, 1911
- Running time: 10 minutes
- Country: United States
- Language: English

The Immortal Alamo is an American silent film released on May 25, 1911. The Immortal Alamo is the earliest film version of the events surrounding the 1836 Battle of the Alamo. The film was directed by William F. Haddock and produced by Gaston Méliès. The film's cast included Francis Ford, Edith Storey, William A. Carroll, and one hundred cadets from the Peacock Military Academy. The film was said to be 10 minutes in length and focused on the formula of "pretty girl, shy hero, and a villain" during the battle.

The film has been noted as historically inaccurate in its plot, but that it tries for accuracy in its setting. Reviews of the film were mixed and C. H. Claudy's criticism of the film is a striking contemporary account of the film's depiction. No known copies of the film exist today, and it is considered to be a lost film.

== Plot ==
The film is a historical drama that depicts General Antonio López de Santa Anna's attack on the Alamo Mission in San Antonio in the Battle of the Alamo. The film was made on location in the Alamo and introduced historical figures such as Davy Crockett and William B. Travis. The film has a romance element where Mexican spy Senor Navarre has affections for Lieutenant Dickenson's wife, Lucy. When the Mexican Army lays siege, Colonel Travis calls upon his men to send word to General Sam Houston and Lieutenant Dickenson volunteers. As soon as he departs, Senor Navarre attempts to charm Lucy Dickenson, but she is repulsed by his advances and is saved from being overpowered by Colonel Travis. Senor Navarre is forced out and proceeds to provide General Santa Anna information on the mission in return for the right to take a survivor to be his bride. After the Alamo falls, only a few women survive, among them is Lucy Dickenson. Senor Navarre holds General Santa Anna to the promise and prepares to marry her the next day. Before the marriage can be performed Lieutenant Dickenson and the reinforcements arrive and capture Senor Navarre. Lieutenant Dickenson avenges his wife's honor by slaying Senor Navarre with his sword. The final scene of the film shows Santa Anna surrendering as a "common soldier".

== Cast ==
- Francis Ford as Senor Navarre,
- Edith Storey as Lucy Dickenson
- William A. Carroll as William B. Travis
- Gaston Méliès as Padre
- William Clifford as Lieutenant Dickenson
- Mr. Young

In response to an inquiry, The Motion Picture Story Magazine section of "Answers to Inquiries" noted that in regard to the two men leaning against a tree, the one with his hand on it was William Clifford and the private leaning against it was Mr. Young.

== Production and release ==
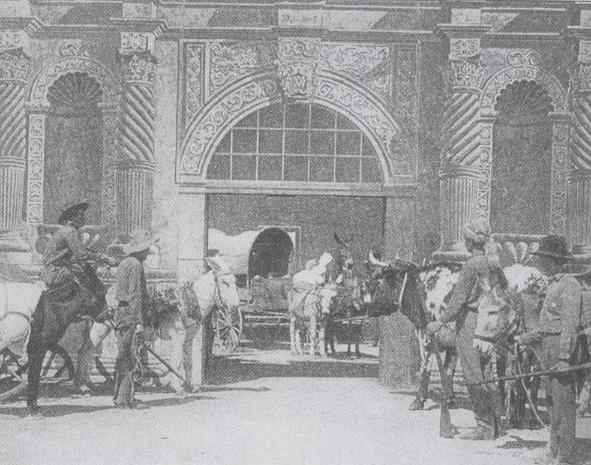
This scene from The Immortal Alamo uses a painted backdrop.

In order to shoot the film, Gaston Méliès moved his production and distribution unit, the Star Film Company from its location in New York to San Antonio in January 1910. Méliès promised to produce a historically "correct" depiction of the Battle of the Alamo. The film was directed by William F. Haddock. The film was shot in San Antonio, Texas and on location at the Alamo. One hundred cadets from the Peacock Military Academy portrayed the Mexican Army. Wilbert Melville "conceived the idea, designed the plot and formulated the scenario" for the film. The film was produced with the permission of the mayor. The film was released on May 25, 1911. One estimate of the cast claimed some five hundred people were present in the picture, but this is not supported by other details of the production.

An advertisement for the film highlighted the Alamo being bombarded with real cannon, the ride of Lieutenant Dickenson with the dispatch to General Sam Houston, the arrival of Davy Crockett, the death of Jim Bowie, the escape of Rose, and the surrender of Santa Anna. One of the first theaters to show the film was the Wonderland Theater which would premiere the film on May 27, 1911. One advertisement for the film gave the film's length as 3,000 feet.

== Historical accuracy ==
Richard R. Flores analyzed the lost film and notes that Méliès' production was claimed to have been 10 minutes in length and that it could not make a significant depiction of the battle. The historical accuracy of the film was compromised to carry out the plot of the "pretty girl, shy hero, and a villain". While Lieutenant Almeron Dickenson was a real person and his wife was present at the mission, her name was Suzanna. Suzanna Dickenson and her infant daughter survived the battle, but there is no evidence of a Mexican spy or a marriage attempt. Instead, Santa Anna sent Suzanna north to inform the victory of the Mexican forces to General Sam Houston. Flores cites Rony's labeling of Méliès' productions as a "hybrid documentary and fantasy" and notes that it was an early attempt at a historical documentary based on its attempt at a faithful setting. Frank Thompson's analysis of the production notes states that William F. Haddock was delving into the archives to produce an accurate depiction of the Alamo at the studio because the Alamo itself was altered from the time of the battle. Thompson noted that despite the battle being within living memory the "exact reproduction" used a painted canvas backdrop and focused on an entirely fictional plot.

== Reception ==
Motography included a brief review of the film which states, "This is indeed a well presented historical subject. The action has breadth and historical perspective, with stirring scenes and large groupings, and at the same time there is a human plot threading its way through the historical background and giving the action a specific interest. The last scene, showing Santa Anna's surrender 'as a common soldier,' is rather obscure. One wonders why he did it. In all other scenes the action is clear and effective. It would be a stolid audience indeed that failed to respond to the thrilling scene inside the Alamo." The Moving Picture World's review stated that "[it] is a very thrilling and altogether satisfactory reproduction of an important historical episode. The company deserves the highest commendation for the picture and the way it is produced."

A negative review in the column "Avoidable Crudites" by C. H. Claudy in The Moving Picture World found great fault with the production. Claudy wrote that "[o]ne hardly conceives of a commander, informed of the approach of a column of the enemy, so far away they are only visible through field glasses, getting sufficiently panic stricken to send immediately for help saying he is besieged by a thousand Mexicans. One imagines he would at least go look and see for himself! And one resents a scene labelled "The Attack," which is so short one can't even look at all of it, said attack being motionless men in a thin line pointing guns at the Alamo! The interior of the Alamo was well done — yet do people stop a desperate defense to go through heroics about a line and fighting to the death? Or do they fight to the death without talking about it? Perhaps the original fighters did go through that line, drawn on the floor, stunt, and agree among themselves to fight till they died, but such desperate fighters didn't all stop fighting at once to discuss the matter. Miss Storey, with a small part, made the most of it, as usual, and gave a convincing presentation of a woman in utter despair, but she deserved a better and less crude setting than she received — and so did her subject."

The June 1911 issue of The Motion Picture Story Magazine included an adapted story written by John Eldridge Chandos from the scenario written by Wilbert Melville.

No known copies of the film exist today, and it is considered to be a lost film. Several movie stills of the film survive.

== See also ==
- List of lost films
