= Bruce Alger =

American politician (1918–2015)

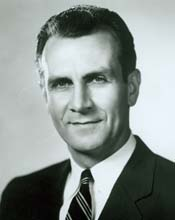

Member of the U.S. House of Representatives from Texas's 5th district
- In office January 3, 1955 – January 3, 1965
- Preceded by: Joseph Franklin Wilson
- Succeeded by: Earle Cabell

Personal details
- Born: Bruce Reynolds Alger; June 12, 1918 Dallas, Texas, U.S.
- Died: April 13, 2015 (aged 96) Palm Bay, Florida, U.S.
- Party: Republican
- Spouses: Lucille Antoine Alger (m. 1943; div. 1961) Priscilla Jones Alger (m. 1976; died 2012)
- Children: 5
- Education: Princeton University
- Occupation: Real estate broker

Military service
- Allegiance: United States
- Branch/service: United States Army
- Years of service: 1941–1945
- Battles/wars: World War II

Bruce Reynolds Alger (June 12, 1918 – April 13, 2015) was an American politician, real estate agent and developer, and a Republican U.S. representative from Texas, the first to have represented a Dallas district since Reconstruction. He served from 1955 until 1965. Though born in Dallas, Alger was raised in Webster Groves, Missouri, a small suburb of St. Louis.

== Early life ==
Alger was the son of David Bruce Alger, a bank representative, and the former Clare Freeman, an aspiring poet and writer. He attended Princeton University in Princeton, New Jersey on a scholarship. There he studied philosophy, art, and music and was a center for the football team. Alger graduated from Princeton with an A.B. in philosophy in 1940 after completing a 73-page long senior thesis titled "Chinese Painting." he went to work for the RCA Corporation as a field representative.

With the coming of World War II, Alger joined the United States Army and was assigned to Squadron 5 at the Army Air Corps Advanced Flying School at Kelly Field in San Antonio, Texas. He flew bombers and attained the rank of captain, claiming to be among the first U.S. troops in Japan after the conclusion of the war in August 1945. He received the Distinguished Flying Cross. On his return to civilian life, RCA refused to rehire him on the grounds that he had been out of television production for too long.

In 1943, he married his first wife, Lucille "Lynn" Antoine.

In April 2013, Alger self-published a book on his experience in World War II; The Crew Book - Miss America '62. The B-29 that Alger piloted was named "Miss America '62" after his daughter who would turn 18 in 1962. The book details the crew's experience through training, combat, and eventually the surrender of Japan.

In 1945, Alger moved to Dallas and formed his own real estate and land development company. He was chosen as the first president of the White Rock Chamber of Commerce.

In 1950, Alger announced the development of a 180-lot subdivision in Far East Dallas off Peavy Road which was to bear his name, and is known as Alger Park. Alger continued to support the development after being elected to Congress, even speaking at ceremonies for the neighborhood.

== Congressional service (1955–1965) ==
In 1954, Alger became the Republican candidate for U.S. House of Representatives for Texas's 5th congressional district. Considering his state's Democratic tradition, it was unexpected that Alger would win. He received 27,982 ballots (52.9 percent) to Democrat Wallace H. Savage's 24,904 (47.1 percent). He was the only Republican in the Texas delegation for eight years until 1963, when Ed Foreman of Odessa, later of Dallas, joined Alger for the final two years of his tenure.

Alger served during the heyday of the Lyndon B. Johnson and Sam Rayburn era. As a Republican, and a strongly conservative Republican at that, he was the odd man out in the Texas delegation of the day. Alger considered himself an individualist, a constitutionalist, and a man of principles. Critics, however, equated his principles to stubbornness.

His belief in limited government conflicted with many of his colleagues, who expected to trade for votes on various issues and projects, something he refused to do. In the era of civil rights, he believed that solutions lay with local, not national government. He maintained that the national government should concentrate on defense and foreign affairs. He believed that the responsibility for social programs belonged at the local level. He was the only member of the House, for example, to oppose the popular school lunch program. Despite being in the majority of the Texas delegation to decline to sign the 1956 Southern Manifesto opposing the desegregation of public schools ordered by the Supreme Court in Brown v. Board of Education, Alger voted against the Civil Rights Acts of 1957, 1960, and 1964, as well as the 24th Amendment to the U.S. Constitution.

According to Time magazine (January 6, 1958), Alger assessed the upcoming second session of the Democratic 85th Congress in a pessimistic but resolved vein: "I foresee bitterness and hatefulness... We are going to squabble and fight and make the world think we hate each other and that we can't solve our problems. We are going to have bigger and bigger budgets, higher taxes, more government spending at home and abroad, and more inflation accompanied by deficit financing. Happy New Year!"

In 1960, Alger organized a protest at the Adolphus Hotel in Dallas against Lyndon Johnson, by then the U.S. Senate majority leader, who was campaigning to become vice president as John F. Kennedy's running mate. Alger held a placard which stated, "LBJ Sold Out to Yankee Socialists." The rally turned ugly, and Lady Bird Johnson was spat upon by a protestor, and her white gloves were yanked from her and thrown into a gutter. Vice President Richard M. Nixon believed that the "Mink Coat Mob" incident caused him to lose Texas's then twenty-four electoral votes to Kennedy and Johnson. Columnists Rowland Evans and Robert Novak said that the protest also affected the votes of white southerners in other states. Nixon later said, "Well, we lost Texas in 1960 because of that a**hole congressman in Dallas". House Speaker Sam Rayburn particularly disliked Alger and was often brutal towards the Republican "interloper" in the Texas delegation.

== Defeated for reelection, 1964 ==
In 1956 and 1958, Alger defeated two Democrats who later became well-known names in the state. In 1956, he edged Henry Wade, the Dallas County district attorney who emerged seventeen years later as the defendant in the Roe v. Wade abortion case. Alger polled 102,380 (55.6 percent) to Wade's 81,705 (44.4 percent). In 1958, a heavily Democratic year nationally, Alger defeated Barefoot Sanders, 62,722 (52.6 percent) to 56,566 (47.4 percent). Sanders was the unsuccessful Democratic nominee against Senator John Tower in 1972 and was later appointed a U.S. District Judge by President Jimmy Carter.

In 1962, Alger won his last term in the House with 89,938 votes (56.3 percent) to Democrat Bill Jones' 69,813 (43.7 percent). Alger was unseated in the 1964 general election by the former mayor of Dallas, Democrat Earle Cabell. Alger polled 127,568 ballots (only 42.5 percent), a considerable number of votes in a House election. Yet, turnout was so much higher in 1964 than in 1962 that Alger lost even though he polled nearly 40,000 more votes in the latter year than in the former. Cabell prevailed with 172,287 (57.5 percent). Alger's defeat can be attributed to:

1. The Democratic trend of Dallas voters in the 1964 election, who also purged the entire six-member Republican state legislative delegation from Dallas County,
2. The political climate that stemmed from the assassination of John F. Kennedy in Dallas,
3. The Democratic tradition of Texas,
4. The presence of a native Texan, President Johnson, on the ballot, and
5. The weak opposition candidacy of Alger's preferred presidential choice, Republican Senator Barry Goldwater of Arizona.

In a 1971 interview with the historian Joe B. Frantz of the University of Texas, John Tower discussed his relationship with Alger, noting that Tower would have deferred to Alger in the 1961 special U.S. Senate election had Alger wanted to run:

"Bruce and I got along very well together. Bruce is a very inflexible man and a suspicious man. He questioned the intellectual honesty of men like Mr. Rayburn and Lyndon Johnson, and so he just didn't make any friends. I have never yet publicly said one disparaging word about a fellow member of the Texas delegation, and don't intend to, although some of them have been inclined to say things about me publicly from time to time. I won't respond."

== Return to private life ==
After a decade in Congress, Alger resumed working as a real estate broker. He formed Bruce Alger Real Estate in 1973. The company had offices in Dallas' One North Park building. He moved for a time to Florida but returned to Dallas in 1976. Alger resided in Carrollton, which is located in three Dallas-area counties. He remained out of the political limelight except for a few public appearances. Alger's congressional papers are located in the archives section of the Dallas Public Library.

Alger was divorced in 1961 from Lucille "Lynn" Antoine, who said that politics caused an estrangement in the marriage to the point that they had little in common except for a liking for gin rummy. The couple had three children, Jill Alger of The Villages in Sumter County in central Florida and sons David and Steven, who died in 1964 and 2012, respectively. Alger's second wife, the former Priscilla Jones, also died in 2012, after thirty-six years of marriage. He had two step-children in Massachusetts, Robert Jones of Amherst and Laura Jones of Chatham. Alger had seven grandchildren and seven great-grandchildren. He retired in 1990 and spent ten years with his wife Priscilla traveling around the United States in a recreational vehicle. The couple settled in 2000 in Barefoot Bay in Brevard County near Melbourne on the central section of the Atlantic Coast of Florida.

On April 13, 2015, Alger died of heart disease at the age of ninety-six at an assisted living facility in Palm Bay, also in Brevard County, Florida.

U.S. House of Representatives
Preceded by Joseph Franklin Wilson	United States Representative for the 5th Congressional District of Texas; 1955–1965	Succeeded by Earle Cabell
