= Gaston Méliès =

French film director (1852–1915)

Gaston Méliès (French: [gastɔ̃ meljɛs]; February 12, 1852 – April 9, 1915) was a French film director who worked primarily in the United States. He was the brother of the film director Georges Méliès.

== Career ==
Gaston and the third and elder Méliès brother, Henri, ran the family shoe factory in Paris. They landed a contract with the French War Ministry that looked to make them both wealthy. Unfortunately, the price of leather increased sharply, and they were unable to meet their costs. The factory shut down and the Méliès brothers lost their business.

Georges Méliès had produced films in France, which had become popular around the world. Some distributors began infringing Méliès work, especially in the United States. Georges Méliès asked his brother Gaston to go the United States and guard Georges's copyrights.

Gaston Méliès arrived in New York City in 1902, formed the American branch of the Star Film Company, and began distributing his brother's films. By 1903, Gaston began making films himself, mostly documentaries. The films were not successful. In the summer of 1907, Gaston Méliès returned to France to take care of some business with Georges. On September 11, 1907, he married Hortense-Louise de Mirmont, an elder sister of Lucien Reulos's wife, who was one of Georges Méliès's first collaborators. The new couple left Paris a few days after their marriage and travelled from Le Havre to New York on the ship La Savoie, where they arrived September 28, 1907.

In need of warmer winters to allow for year-round film production, Méliès moved the Star Film Company to San Antonio, Texas, and leased twenty acres including a two-story house and large barn that became the "Star Film Ranch" movie studio. He acted in two of his movies playing a priest in The Immortal Alamo (1911) and The Kiss of Mary Jane (1911).

In April, 1911, Gaston moved the company to Santa Paula, California, following the trend of other movie studios to relocate in California.

In 1912 and 1913 Méliès travelled around Asia Pacific with his family and a film crew of close to 20 people, with whom he filmed in French Polynesia, New Zealand, Australia, Tahiti, Indonesia, Singapore, Cambodia and Japan in search of exotic subjects. During this trip which lasted from July 1912 to May 1913, Gaston Méliès filmed 64 movies, sending the footage back to his son Paul in New York, but this footage was often damaged or unusable. Gaston was no longer able to fulfill Star Film's obligation to Thomas Edison's company. Gaston lost $50,000 and had to cease production. He went to California, sold the American branch of Star Films to Vitagraph Studios, and then returned to Europe. He and his brother Georges (who blamed Gaston for his own financial difficulties) never spoke to one another again.

Méliès and his wife moved to Corsica in the winter of 1913. He died in Corsica on April 9, 1915, of "shellfish poisoning." He was buried on April 14, 1915, in Saint-Vincent Cemetery in Montmartre, Paris, in a tomb belonging to his second wife's family, De Mirmont.

== Filmography ==
Unless otherwise referenced, the following information is adapted from the research of Paul Hammond. All films were released by the Star Film Company.

=== 1903–1909 ===
In the table below, "SFC" refers to the numbers used for film listings in the Star Film Company catalogues; Hammond's research identifies the catalogue numbers for the first three of Gaston Méliès's films. Film length is given in meters and feet.

SFC	Release date	Title	Length	Notes
482A	August 1903	The Yacht Race (Reliance–Shamrock III)	43m/140 ft	French title: Une Course de yachts
668A	February 1905	Inauguration Subjects: President-Elect Roosevelt, Vice-President-Elect Fairbanks and Escort Going to the Capitol	45m/146 ft	Listed as notable by the American Film Institute
1114–1115	May 1908	The Catholic Centennial Celebration	292m/950 ft	
—	June 1908	Pageant, Dedication, Festival	Unknown	UK release title: Boston Normal School Pageant
—	October 1909	The Stolen Wireless	289m/915 ft	
—	November 1909	The Red Star Inn	307m/1000 ft	
—	December 1909	The Fatal Ball	307m/1000 ft	

=== 1910–1912 ===
Billy and His Pal (1911), shot in San Antonio, Texas, was rediscovered in New Zealand in 2010. It is one of only five surviving films from the Star Film Ranch.

The following films, all one-reelers, were made between 7 April 1910 and 25 July 1912 in Texas and California.

- Cyclone Pete in Matrimony
- Making Sherry Wine at Xeres
- Branding the Thief
- The Seal of the Church
- The First Born
- The Lover's Oracle
- Trawlers Fishing in a Hurricane
- The Story of Old Mexico
- Volcanic Eruptions
- The Rival Miners
- The Debt Repaid
- Indian Drama
- Speed Versus Death
- A Thrilling Race Against Time
- A Race for a Bride
- A Rough Night on the Bridge
- The Palefaced Princess
- The Padre's Secret
- Love's C. Q. D.
- A Texas Joke
- White Doe's Lovers
- The Stranded Actor
- The Ruling Passion
- The Little Preacher
- The Golden Secret
- A Postal Substitute
- The Woman in the Case
- Mrs. Bargainday's Baby
- The Return to To-Wa-Wa
- The Winning Way
- The Romance of Circle Ranch
- Won in the Fifth
- In the Mission Shadows
- The Salt on the Bird's Tail
- A Plucky American Girl
- Bill's Sister
- Baseball That's All
- Out of Mischief
- Uncle Jim
- Under the Stars and Bars
- Birthday Cigars
- Generous Customers
- A Mountain Wife
- His Sergeant's Stripes
- The Cowboy and the Bachelor Girl
- Pals
- What Great Bear Learned
- Old Norris' Gal
- A Western Welcome
- In the Tall Grass Country
- The Crimson Scars
- The Owner of the "LL" Ranch
- Changing Cooks
- How Mary Met the Cowpunchers
- Only a Sister
- Tony the Greaser
- Billy and His Pal
- My Prairie Flower
- In the Hot Lands
- The Snake in the Grass
- The Schoolmarm of Coyote Country
- Sir Percy and the Punchers
- The Warrant for Red Rube
- Her Faithful Heart
- Jack Wilson's Last Deal
- An Unwilling Cowboy
- The Reformation of Jack Robins
- Mary's Stratagem
- The Spring Round-Up
- The Redemption of Rawhide
- The Immortal Alamo
- In Time for Press
- Her Spoiled Boy
- When the Tables Turned
- The Kiss of Mary Jane
- The Honor of the Flag
- Right of Way
- The Great Heart of the West
- The Strike at the Gringo
- Bessie's Ride
- At the Gringo Mine
- Red Cloud's Secret
- His Terrible Lesson
- The Local Bully
- Two Foolies and their Follies
- A Spanish Love Song
- The Call of the Wilderness
- A Shattered Dream
- $200.00
- The Mission Waif
- The Hobo Cowboy
- The Stolen Grey
- Tommy's Rocking Horse
- The Cross of Pearls
- The Gypsy Bride
- Right or Wrong
- Mexican As It Is Spoken
- The Spur of Necessity
- The Miser Miner
- An Oil County Romance
- The Reason Why
- A Western Girl
- The Better Man
- The Mission Father
- The Ranch Man's Debt of Honor
- A Woman's Gratitude
- Roped In
- Alice's Choice
- The Outlaw and the Baby
- The Mortgage
- Cowboy Vs Tenderfoot
- Dodging the Sheriff
- Smiling Bob
- Melita's Ruse
- The Swastika
- All Is Fair
- The Rustler's Daughter
- Oil
- The Sheriff's Daughter
- Troubles of the XL Outfit
- The Remittance Man
- A Man Worth While
- Wanted—A Wife
- The Ghost of Sulphur Mountain
- True Till Death
- A Cowboy's Proposal
- Finding the "Last Chance" Mine
- Widowers Three
- Making Good
- Ghosts at Circle X Camp
- Two Loves
- A Woman's Way
- The Cowboy Kid
- The Man Inside
- A String of Beads

=== 1912–1913 ===
The following are the films made between July 1912 and May 1913 on Méliès's Pacific travels.

- The Misfortunes of Mr. and Mrs. Mott on Their Trip to Tahiti
- A Tale of Old Tahiti
- Unmasked by a Kanaka
- A Ballad of the South Seas
- The Upa Upa Dance
- The River Wanganui
- A Tahitian Fish Drive
- Hinemoa
- How Chief Te Ponga Won His Bride
- Loved by a Maori Chieftess
- Cast Amid Boomerang Throwers
- The Golden Gully
- The Black Trackers
- The Foster Brothers
- Gold and the Gilded Way
- The Stolen Claim
- The Lure of the Sacred Pearl
- It Happened in Java
- Javanese Dancers
- Snapshots of Java
- Views of Samarang
- Native Industries of Java
- The Robber of Angkor
- A Cambodian Idyll
- Lost in Cambodia
- The Poisoned Darts
- His Chinese Friend
- A Chinese Funeral
- The Yellow Slave
- The Rice Industry in Japan
- Temples of Japan
- A Japanese Wedding
- Japanese Judo Commonly Known as Jiu Jitsu

== See also ==
- Category:Films directed by Gaston Méliès
- Category:Films produced by Gaston Méliès
- Maata Horomona
