= Sgt. Haane =

- Directed by: Tearepa Kahi
- Written by: Tearepa Kahi
- Screenplay by: Tearepa Kahi
- Produced by: Selina Joe; Reikura Kahi; Donna Morrison
- Cinematography: Chris Mauger
- Edited by: Francis Glenday
- Production company: Jawbone Pictures
- Release date: 23 April 2026
- Running time: 86 minutes
- Country: New Zealand
- Language: English

Sgt. Haane is a 2026 New Zealand documentary film directed and written by Tearepa Kahi. The documentary focused on the Māori Battalion veteran Sergeant Haane Manahi and his troops' role in capturing a sheer-faced pinnacle in Takrouna, Tunisia from Axis forces during the Battle of the Mareth Line in 1943. While Manahi was initially recommended for the Victoria Cross by his superiors, it was subsequently downgraded to a Distinguished Conduct Medal by the British War Office. Sgt. Haane stars Alex Tarrant as Haane Manahi alongside Ryan O'Kane, Vinnie Bennett, John Bach, Niwa Whatuira, Matuera Ngaropo and Poroaki Merritt-McDonald. The documentary was released in New Zealand cinemas on 23 April 2026 to coincide with Anzac Day.

== Synopsis ==
Sgt. Haane focuses on Sergeant Haane Manahi and his Māori Battalion unit B company's efforts to capture an enemy-held pinnacle in Takrouna during the Battle of the Mareth Line in March 1943. Interviews with the descendants of Haane and his comrades are interspersed with dramatised footage featuring several actors including Alex Tarrant as Haane Manahi, along with Niwa Whatuira, Vinnie Bennett, Matu Ngaropo, Poroaki Merritt-McDonald and Rihari Te Are as B Company soldiers. The documentary shows the unit navigating through mountainous terrain to scale the pinnacle and capture the area from German forces garrisoned there. On the way, they befriend several local Tunisians including Salah Chhoubi. During a German counter attack, Haane's cousin Johnny was killed. Haane avenges their deaths.

Following the battle, Manahi was recommended for a Victoria Cross by three generals and a field marshal but an unidentified British War Office downgraded it to a Distinguished Conduct Medal. The documentary features interviews with several relatives of Manahi and his comrades including his grand-cousin Donna Morrison, Kīngi Biddle, Colin Bennett, Raimona Inia,Anaru Grant Jr., Vicky May Bhana, and Geoff Dargie. Sgt. Haane also features interviews with Nizar Chhoubi, a grandson of Salah, a local Tunisian who helped Manahi and his comrades. Nizar recalls that the Māori Battalion soldiers helped shelter and protect the Chhoubi family.

== Production ==
Sgt. Haane was directed and written by Tearepa Kahi. The documentary was produced by Selina Joe, Reikura Kahi and Donna Morrison. Kahi and Kelly Rogers also served as executive producers. Cast members included Alex Tarrant as Haane Manahi, Niwa Whatuira as Johnny, Vinnie Bennett as Hinga, Matu Ngaropo as Monty, and Poroaki Merritt-McDonald as Rangi. Ryan O'Kane played British Army General Brian Horrocks while John Bach played an older version of Horrocks. Rihari Te Are played Charles Bennett while George Henare played an older version of Bennett.

Mahuia Bridgman-Cooper served as composer while Chris Mauger served as cinematographer. The documentary was edited by Franois Glenday. Pauline Pohatu served as costume designer. Sven Wiig served as production designer. Melissa Mitchell served as makeup artist. Sgt. Haane received funding from NZ On Air, Te Māngai Pāho, the New Zealand Film Commission, and Kiwibank.

== Release ==
Sgt Haane was released in New Zealand cinemas on 23 April 2026. It was later released on TVNZ+ on 10 July to coincide with Matariki.

== Reception ==
=== Critical reception ===
Liam Rātana and Emma Gleason of The Spinoff gave Sgt. Haane a positive review, describing it as "a triumphant documentary of a harrowing event." Gleason praised the music score produced by the New Zealand Symphony Orchestra and composer Mahuia Bridgman-Cooper. She also praised the performances of Alex Tarrant as the titular character, as well as the performances of supporting cast members Niwa Whatuira, Vinnie Bennett, Matu Ngaropo, Poroaki Merritt-McDonald and Rihari Te Are. Rātana also praised the documentary for highlighting Manahi and his comrade's relationship with Tunisian local Nizar Chhoubhi, saying that it enhanced Manahi's mana (honour) beyond New Zealand. Rātana and Gleason also praised the documentary for highlighting the work of the soldiers' descendants in preserving their memory.

=== Accolades ===
During the 2026 New Zealand Screen Awards, Sgt. Haane won one award: "Best Camerawork - Documentary/Factual Feature" (Chris Mauger).
