= Tearepa Kahi =

New Zealand director

- Born: 16 March 1978 (age 48); Christchurch, New Zealand
- Occupations: Director, actor

Tearepa Kahi (born 16 March 1978), also known as Te Arepa Kahi, is a New Zealand film director and former actor of Ngāti Paoa and Waikato Tainui descent. Kahi is best known for the 2013 drama Mt. Zion starring Stan Walker, and the Pātea Māori Club documentary Poi E: The Story of a Song (2016).

== Biography ==
Kahi grew up in Christchurch in the suburb of Papanui, and is of Ngāti Paoa and Waikato Tainui descent. Kahi's father was a musician who toured with Billy TK. As a teenager, he spent two years as a part of a theatre troupe run by actor Jim Moriarty. He attended Burnside High School. Moving to his grandmother's house in Pukekohe, Kahi studied history and Māori at the University of Auckland. From 1999 to 2002, Kahi acted in minor roles on television shows including Shortland Street, Mataku and Aroha – Irikura, and in the Don Selwyn film The Maori Merchant of Venice (2002). Kahi's co-wrote the short film The Speaker with rapper Savage, which won the award for best short film at the Wairoa Māori Film Festival.

Kahi's debut wide release feature film Mt. Zion was one of the most successful New Zealand films of 2013. Kahi debuted as a television director in 2016, with the release of the Whakaata Māori historical drama series Kairākau (2016).

In 2016, Kahi released his second feature film, Poi E: The Story of a Song, a film documenting the story of the Pātea Māori Club, Dalvanius Prime and the creation of the 1984 hit Māori language single "Poi E". This was followed by a documentary of New Zealand reggae band Herbs in 2019.

In 2022, Kahi released Muru, a dramatisation of the 2007 New Zealand police raids.

Sgt. Haane, Kahi’s film about Māori Battalion member Haane Manahi, was released on 23 April 2026, with a premiere in Rotorua on 19 April.

Kahi is a member of the board of the New Zealand International Film Festival.

== Personal life ==
Kahi acted opposite his wife Reikura Morgan in the film The Maori Merchant of Venice (2002).

== Filmography ==
=== Films ===
Year	Title	Director	Writer	Notes
2006	The Speaker	Yes	Yes	Short film
2007	Taua	Yes	Yes	Short film
2009	The Flight of Te Hookioi	Yes	Yes	Documentary
2011	Allan Baldwin: In Frame	Yes	Yes	Documentary
2013	Mt. Zion	Yes	Yes	
2016	Hunt for the Wilderpeople	No	Yes	Additional writing
2016	Poi E: The Story of Our Song	Yes	Yes	Documentary
2019	Herbs: Songs of Freedom	Yes	Yes	Documentary
2022	Muru	Yes	Yes	
2026	Sgt. Haane	Yes	Yes	Documentary

=== Television ===
Year	Title	Director	Writer	Notes
2016–2020	Kairākau	No	Yes	
2019	NZ Wars	No	Yes	Episode: "Stories of Waitara"
