= Donna Awatere Huata =

New Zealand politician

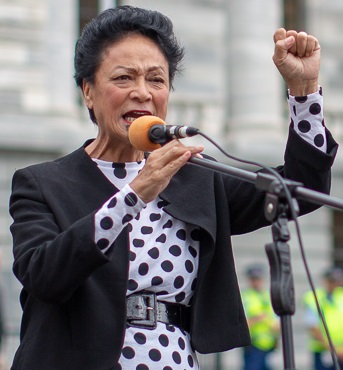
- Awatere Huata speaking in 2019

Member of the New Zealand Parliament for ACT list
- In office 12 October 1996 – 19 November 2004
- Succeeded by: Kenneth Wang (Note: Normally, list MPs do not have individual predecessors or successors, but Awatere Huata was expelled during a sitting parliament and therefore was succeeded by Wang.)

Personal details
- Born: 1949 (age 76–77) Rotorua, New Zealand
- Party: ACT New Zealand (former)
- Spouse: Wi Huata
- Relations: Arapeta Awatere (father)

Donna Lynn Awatere Huata (sometimes written Awatere-Huata, née Awatere; born 1949) is a former member of the New Zealand Parliament for the ACT New Zealand Party, activist for Māori causes, and convicted fraudster.

== Early life ==
Donna Awatere was born in Rotorua in 1949, and was educated in Auckland. Her primary area of study was education, particularly educational psychology, but she has also undertaken study in operatic singing and film production.

Her father, Colonel Arapeta Awatere DSO MC, was a prominent member of the Māori Battalion who was later elected to the Auckland City Council. In 1969 he was convicted of the murder of his mistress's lover and sent to jail, where he eventually died.

== Activism ==
From the 1970s Awatere became involved in the Māori protest movement, including the group Ngā Tamatoa. She was a leading protester against the 1981 Springbok Tour, and in 1984 she published Maori Sovereignty, which became a key text in the Māori protest movement. During this period she and fellow Māori activist Ripeka Evans went to Communist Cuba. She was also involved in feminist politics, and Maori Sovereignty was originally written for the feminist magazine Broadsheet. She was critical of white feminists who ignored issues of race, and expressed the opinion that the problems facing Māori were more important than those facing women and other marginalised groups. In Maori Sovereignty she is generally critical of the established left.

After the publication of Maori Sovereignty, Awatere retired from protest and became a biculturalism consultant for various organisations, including the New Zealand Treasury and the New Zealand Police. She also imported a children's reading programme, which she later developed and promoted through the Pipi Foundation. During this period she married Wi Huata and changed her surname from Awatere to Awatere Huata.

In 2024, Maori Sovereignty was listed in Books of Mana as one of the 180 most significant works of Māori-authored non-fiction.

== Member of Parliament ==
=== Member of Parliament ===
New Zealand Parliament
Years	Term	Electorate	List	Party
1996–1999	45th	List	4	ACT
1999–2002	46th	List	4	ACT
2002–2003	47th	List	5	ACT
2003–2004	Changed allegiance to:			Independent

Shortly before the 1996 election, Awatere Huata joined the ACT New Zealand party. This surprised many commentators, as ACT was not generally associated with the sort of cause that Awatere Huata had previously supported. In a 2019 interview on Māori Television's current affairs programme Te Ao with Moana, Awatere Huata claimed she joined ACT as she supported its educational policy of the funding following the child, as she believed this would make it easier to establish Kura Kaupapa and Kohanga Reo. She described herself as being at the time too "economically naïve to understand [ACT's agenda] was a neoliberal agenda," and said once discovering this she resolved to stay within parliament and "fight from within". In the interview she described going with ACT as being "one step too far".

Awatere Huata was ranked in fourth place on ACT's party list, and stood as a candidate in the Māori electorate of Te Puku O Te Whenua, coming in 4th place. She was not successful in her electorate race, but entered Parliament as a list MP. In the 1999 election, she polled fifth in Auckland Central but due to her fourth-place ranking on the party's list consequently remained in Parliament. In the 2002 election, she came fourth in Napier and although she was lowered to fifth place on the list, nevertheless remained in parliament comfortably.

=== Pipi Foundation Affair ===
In 2003 Awatere Huata was expelled from the ACT party on allegations of fraud regarding the Pipi Foundation charity, which at the time was under investigation by the Serious Fraud Office. Subsequently, there were a series of legal battles around Awatere Huata's right to remain in parliament as an independent list MP. These culminated in one of the Supreme Court's first major decisions in 2004 and she was removed from Parliament, giving the ACT Party a new MP, Kenneth Wang until the 2005 New Zealand election.

Awatere Huata was charged by the Serious Fraud Office and later convicted of fraud after taking $80,000 from the Pipi Foundation, a Government funded charity, she had set up as an MP in 1999. The media reported that "Some of the stolen money was used to pay for Awatere Huata's stomach stapling operation and some was used to pay state-integrated school fees for the couple's children." On 30 September 2005, she was sentenced to 2 years 9 months in jail alongside her husband, Wi Huata, who received 2 years with the ability to apply for home detention. On 16 May 2006, she was released on home detention and after her sentence was completed in February 2009, she was able to set up a correspondence teaching centre "The Learning Post". In October 2010 another school she and her husband ran was forced to go into liquidation owing large sums of money. NZQA said that many of the courses were inadequately supported. The school had only 15 pupils.

In a 2019 interview with Moana Maniapoto Awatere Huata stated "I am proud of the fact that because of the issues that erupted around me that led to me being expelled from parliament, I actually helped bring down ACT. And that, to me, is a big achievement."

== After Parliament ==
Awatere Huata worked briefly in several roles for New Zealand Māori Council, including administrative support and representing the council at the United Nations Permanent Forum on Indigenous Issues. This was followed by a role under Mark Solomon at the Māori Carbon Foundation.

In mid-March 2022, Awatere Huata and her husband Wi Huata were ordered to vacate their home and farm on disputed land in Maraekakaho near Hastings. Justice Christine Grice ruled in favour of the Te Hua Whenua Trust's trustees, who disputed the Huata's lease of the land for the past 35 years. This decision reversed a Maori Land Court ruling and was appealed. The Huatas withdrew their appeal in August 2022 and vacated the land as ordered on 2 February 2024.

== Published works ==
  - ACT Members of Parliament. (2001), Closing the gaps: policy papers, Wellington, [N.Z.]: ACT New Zealand Parliamentary Office, ISBN 0-9582178-1-5
- Awatere Huata's contribution is a paper entitled: "Common sense in education."
  - NZLIA Wanganui, October 1997 [sound recording] [New Zealand Library and Information Association. Conference (1997 : Wanganui, N.Z.)], Wellington, [N.Z.]: NZLIA, 1997
- Awatere Huata's contribution is a paper entitled: "Maori client needs of the future."
  - from ACT Members of Parliament. (2001), Old values, new ideas, Wellington, [N.Z.]: ACT New Zealand Parliamentary Office, ISBN 0-477-01964-1
- Awatere Huata's contribution is a paper entitled: "Kiwi myth or New Zealand dream?"
  - Report of the Controller and Auditor-General, Tumuaki o te Mana Arotake, on inquiry into public funding of organisations associated with Donna Awatere Huata MP, Wellington, [N.Z.]: Controller and Auditor-General, 2003, ISBN 0-478-18111-6
  - Waka Huia. Kokohinau [videorecording]. Marae [9 June 1996], Auckland, [N.Z.]: University of Auckland, 2004
- As part of this Television New Zealand Maori programme (made at the Kokohinau Marae near Te Teko), Awatere Huata was interviewed about her book, My journey (for details of the book, see below)
  - Youth and music [sound recording] [Kiwi SLC-72], Wellington, [N.Z.]: Kiwi, 1969
- This is another iteration of the Ashley Heenan recording listed below.
  - Awatere, Donna (c. 1980), The Otara four minute reading programme, Pakuranga, [N.Z.]: Psychological Service, Dept. of Education
  - Awatere, Donna (1982), Cultural imperialsm [i.e. imperialism] and the Maori: the role of the public servant, n.p.: n.p.
  - Awatere, Donna (1984), Maori sovereignty, Auckland, [N.Z.]: Broadsheet, ISBN 0-9597736-0-6
- The first three parts of this book were originally published in the New Zealand feminist magazine, Broadsheet.
  - Awatere, Donna; Hadfield, Lois (1979), The Otara four minute reading programme: manual, Otara, [N.Z.]: n.p.
  - Awatere, Donna; Mareroa, Maria (c. 1980), Te koputu taonga: Otara: an emergent model of community development, Wellington, [N.Z.]: n.p.
- "This paper was prepared for the Public Service in a Multicultural Society conference, State Services Commission, March 1982" (p.4).
  - Awatere, Donna; et al. (1984), Alcohol and the Maori people, Auckland, [N.Z.]: Alcohol Research Unit, School of Medicine, University of Auckland
  - Awatere Huata, Donna (prod.) (1989), Haka [video recording], Wellington, [N.Z.]: Film Commission, (1988): Dept. of Education, Visual Production Unit [distributor]
  - Awatere Huata, Donna (1996), My journey, Auckland, [N.Z.]: Seaview Press
  - Awatere Huata, Donna (2002), The reading race: how every child can learn to read, Wellington, [N.Z.]: Huia, ISBN 1-877283-67-3
  - Brockie, Bob, ed. (2002), The Penguin eyewitness history of New Zealand: dramatic first-hand accounts from New Zealand's history, Auckland, [N.Z.]: Penguin, ISBN 0-14-301825-6
- Awatere's contribution is a paper entitled: "Maori Land March, 1975."
  - Goldson, Annie; Hutchesson, Dawn (dir.) (2004), Sheilas [videorecording]: 28 years on , Auckland, [N.Z.]: Occasional Productions, ISBN 0-908896-30-1
- Awatere Huata (and five other women) was initially interviewed in 1976 for a documentary series: this production is an update on her (and their) life and times.
  - Heenan, Ashley (1995), Orchestral and vocal music / Selections [sound recording] [Kiwi Pacific SLD-102], Wellington, [N.Z.]: Kiwi Pacific
- Awatere's contribution is as one of the vocal soloists on the sixth track.
  - Kedgley, Sue (1993), Varnham, Mary (ed.), Heading nowhere in a navy blue suit: and other tales from the feminist revolution, Wellington, [N.Z.]: Daphne Brasell Associates Press, ISBN 0-908896-30-1
- Awatere Huata's contribution is a paper entitled: "Walking on eggs." This volume has an introduction by Dale Spender.
  - Melbourne, Hineani, ed. (1995), Maori sovereignty: the Maori perspective, Auckland, [N.Z.]: Hodder Moa Beckett, ISBN 1-86958-208-X
