= Arapeta =

Arapeta is a given name. It is a Māori transliteration of the name Albert. Notable people with the name include:

- Arapeta Awatere (1910–1976), Māori military hero
- Arapeta Paurini Wharepapa, also known as Albert Asher (1879–1965), New Zealand rugby union and rugby league player
