= Peter Williams (lawyer) =

New Zealand barrister (1934–2015)

Sir Peter Williams KNZM QC
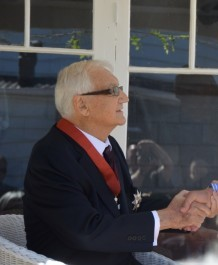
- Williams in April 2015
- Born: Peter Alderidge Williams; 1 December 1934; Ohakune, New Zealand
- Died: 9 June 2015 (aged 80); Ponsonby, Auckland, New Zealand
- Occupations: Lawyer, writer
- Spouse: Heeni Phillips-Williams

Sir Peter Alderidge Williams KNZM QC (1 December 1934 – 9 June 2015) was a New Zealand barrister and penal reform advocate. He was appointed a Queen's Counsel in 1987.

== Biography ==
Williams was born in 1934 and educated at Feilding High School. He graduated from the University of New Zealand at Auckland in 1960. A noted defence lawyer, Williams represented high-profile clients including Terry Clark, Ronald Jorgensen, Arapeta Awatere and Winston Peters, and was involved in having the conviction of Arthur Allan Thomas for the murders of Harvey and Jeannette Crewe overturned. During his 60-year career, he appeared in over 100 murder trials.

Williams was a long-time advocate for the humane treatment of prisoners in New Zealand, and served as the head of the New Zealand Howard League for Penal Reform. He was the foundation president of the NZ Criminal Bar Association.

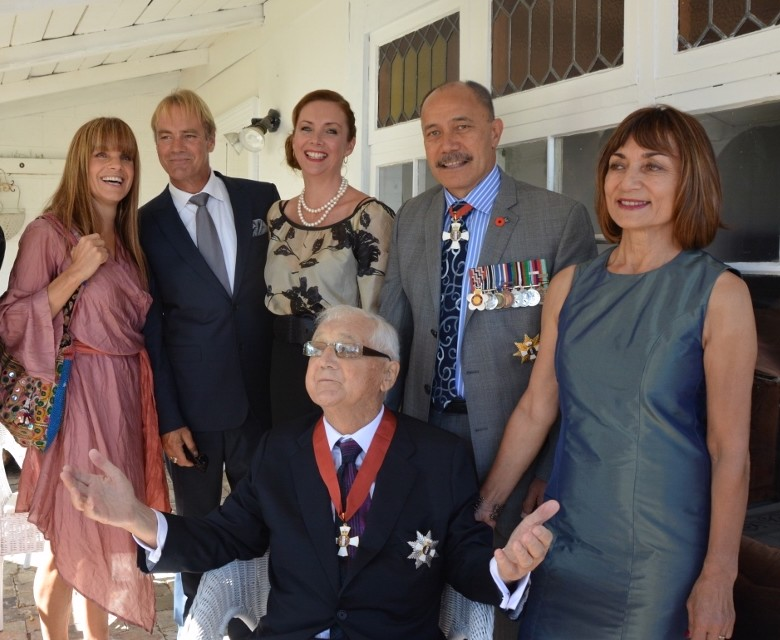
Governor-Gen. Jerry Mateparae (standing, right) with Peter Williams (seated), Lady Heeni Phillips-Williams (right), and family at Sir Peter's home for his knighthood investiture

Williams was appointed a Queen's Counsel in 1987. In 1990, he was awarded the New Zealand 1990 Commemoration Medal, and in the 2015 New Year Honours Williams was appointed a Knight Companion of the New Zealand Order of Merit for services to the law. A private investiture was held at his home on 11 April 2015, as it was feared he might not live until the scheduled investiture on 6 May 2015 at Government House in Auckland. He died from prostate cancer at his home in the Auckland suburb of Ponsonby on 9 June 2015, survived by his wife, Lady Heeni Phillips-Williams.

== Published works ==
Williams wrote a number of books including:

- Williams, Peter (1990). Judicial misconduct. Petaling Jaya: Pelanduk. ISBN 9679783219.
- Williams, Peter (1997). A passion for justice. Christchurch: Shoal Bay Press. ISBN 0908704631.
- Williams, Peter (2009). Petals of memory: sailer, poet, protester. Auckland: self-published. ISBN 9780473153847.
- Williams, Peter (2012). Nemesis to prejudice: spoken essays, 1996–1999. Auckland: Grey Gull. ISBN 9780473203696.
- Williams, Peter (2014). The dwarf who moved: and other remarkable tales from a life in the law. Auckland: Harper Collins. ISBN 9781775540472.
