= Haane Manahi =

New Zealand Army soldier (1913–1986)

Haane Manahi DCM
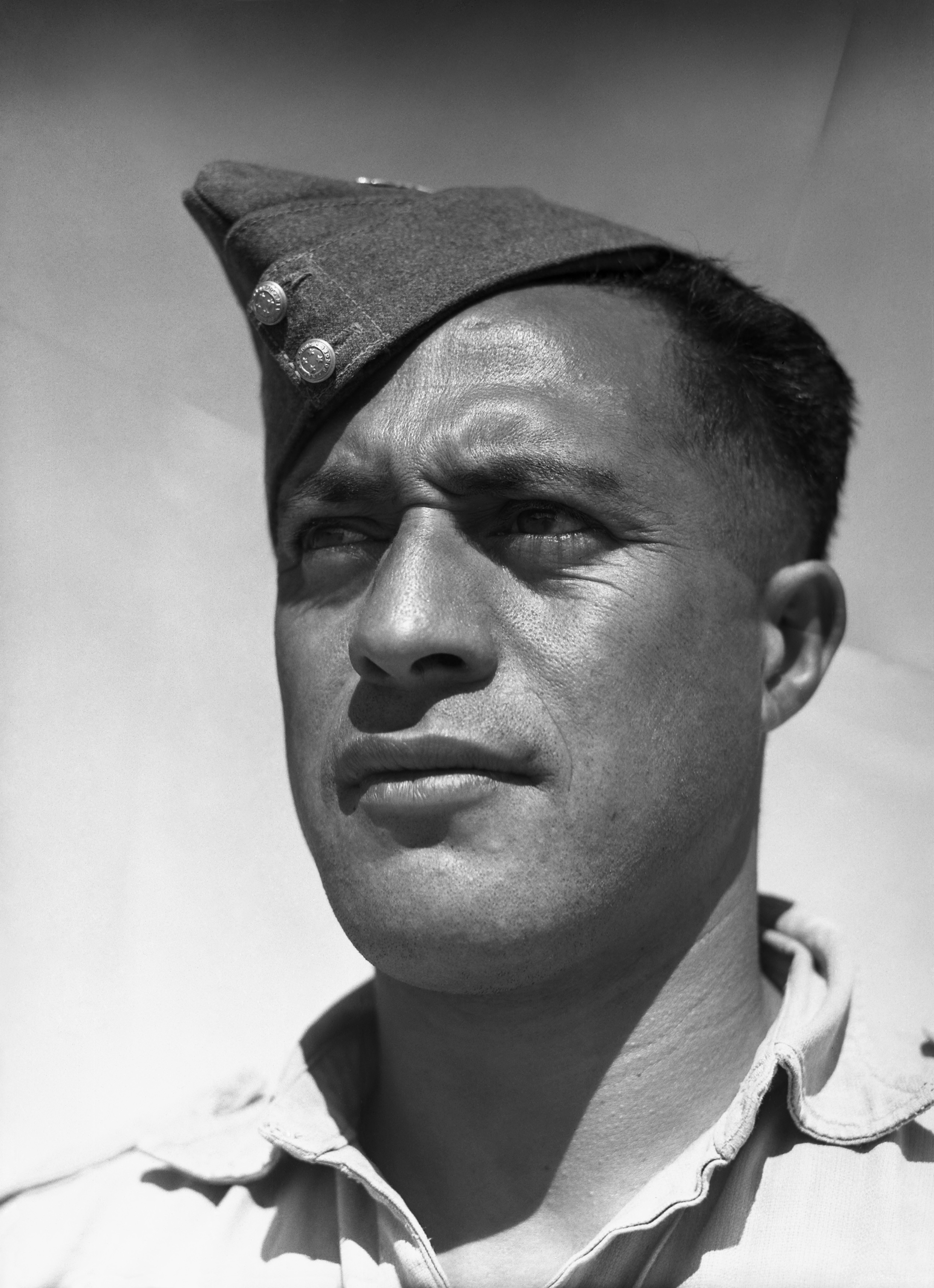
- Manahi in 1943
- Born: Haane Te Rauawa Manahi; 28 September 1913; Ohinemutu, New Zealand
- Died: 29 March 1986 (aged 72); Tauranga, New Zealand
- Military career
- Allegiance: New Zealand
- Branch: New Zealand Military Forces
- Service years: 1939–1946
- Rank: Lance Sergeant
- Unit: Māori Battalion
- Conflicts: Second World War; Battle of Greece; Battle of Crete; Western Desert campaign; Tunisia campaign
- Awards: Distinguished Conduct Medal

Haane Te Rauawa Manahi, DCM (28 September 1913 – 29 March 1986) was a New Zealand Māori soldier during the Second World War whose gallantry during the Tunisian campaign resulted in a recommendation that he be awarded the Victoria Cross (VC). The subsequent award of the Distinguished Conduct Medal (DCM) disappointed his fellow soldiers who, after his death, advocated greater recognition of his valour. This eventually resulted in a special award in 2007 of an altar cloth for use in a local church, ceremonial sword and a personal letter from Queen Elizabeth II in recognition of his gallantry.

Born in Ohinemutu, New Zealand, Manahi worked as a labourer when, in November 1939, he volunteered to join the Māori Battalion, newly raised for service in the Second World War. In 1941, he participated in the Battle of Greece and fought in the Battle of Crete during which he was wounded. After recovering from his wounds, he returned to his unit and fought through the Western Desert and Tunisian campaigns, during which he was recommended for a VC for his actions at Takrouna over the period 19–21 April 1943. Despite the support of four generals, his VC nomination was downgraded to an award of a DCM, possibly by the British Chief of the General Staff, General Alan Brooke.

In June 1943, he returned to New Zealand on a three-month furlough but when this was completed, was not required to rejoin his battalion. Māori soldiers on furlough were made exempt from active duty. After his discharge from the New Zealand Military Forces in 1946, he was employed as a traffic inspector. After his death in a car crash in 1986, a committee was established to urge the New Zealand Government to make representations to Buckingham Palace for a posthumous award of the VC to Manahi. These efforts were ultimately unsuccessful due to the period of time that had elapsed since the end of the Second World War.

== Early life ==
Haane Te Rauawa Manahi was the son of Manahi Ngākahawai Te Rauawa, a farm worker, and his wife Neti Mariana (née Insley). He was born on 28 September 1913 in Ohinemutu, a village near the town of Rotorua in the North Island of New Zealand. A Māori, he was descended from the Te Arawa and Ngāti Raukawa iwi (tribes) on his father's side, while his mother was also of the Te Arawa iwi in addition to having some Scottish heritage. He attended local schools up to secondary school level. After leaving school, he worked in road construction and farm labour. He also spent time in the timber and building industries alongside his paternal uncle, Matiu Te Rauawa, who had served in the New Zealand Pioneer Battalion that had been raised for military duty during the First World War.

== Second World War ==
In November 1939, following the outbreak of the Second World War, Manahi was one of the first men to enlist in the newly formed Māori Battalion. The battalion was composed of a headquarters company and four rifle companies, which were organised along tribal lines. Manahi was assigned to B Company, made up largely of other men from Te Arawa. The Māori Battalion was one of ten infantry battalions in the 2nd New Zealand Division and training commenced at Trentham Military Camp in January 1940. Shortly before he departed his home for Trentham, Manahi married Rangiawatea née Te Kiri, the mother of his son, born in 1936.

In early May 1940, after Manahi and the rest of his fellow soldiers had two weeks of home leave prior to departing the country, the battalion embarked for the Middle East as part of the second echelon of the division. While in transit, the convoy carrying the second echelon was diverted to England following the entry of Italy into the war on the side of Nazi Germany. In England, the threat of invasion was high following the evacuation of the British Expeditionary Force from France. After a short period of leave in London, the New Zealanders were engaged in further training and defensive duties, with the Māori Battalion based in Kent and then, once the threat of invasion had receded, in Aldershot. Manahi's company was briefly separated and stationed at Waverley Abbey House in Surrey. By late November, it had been decided that the New Zealanders could be sent to the Middle East. The second echelon left for Egypt in early January 1941, with Manahi and the rest of his battalion aboard the Athlone Castle.

=== Greece and Crete ===
On 27 March 1941, Manahi's battalion, having spent two months in Egypt, arrived in Greece to assist in its defence against an anticipated German invasion. Subordinate to the 5th Infantry Brigade, it initially took up defensive positions around Olympus Pass, and in the days following the beginning of the invasion on 6 April, rebuffed initial contact by the advancing Germans. The battalion had to withdraw as the flanks of the Allied positions were threatened. B Company was the last of the battalion's units to abandon its positions, and together with the rest of the Allies, withdrew over the following days to Porto Rafti, where it boarded a transport ship for the island of Crete.

On Crete, the Allies dug in for the expected airborne attack by German paratroopers. The Māori Battalion was positioned near the town of Platanias, as a reserve for the 5th Infantry Brigade, which was tasked with the defence of Maleme Airfield. On 20 May, the Germans commenced their invasion of the island. Manahi was returning to his trench, having just had breakfast, as planes flew overhead, discharging paratroopers. On 23 May, following the loss of the airfield to the Germans, he received a gunshot wound to the chest. Despite this wound, he remained with his company as it was forced to withdraw to the south-west in the following days and was eventually evacuated from Crete on 31 May and transported to Egypt.

=== North Africa ===
By mid-June 1941, after a period of recuperation and leave, Manahi had returned to the Māori Battalion, which had undergone a reorganisation following the campaign in Greece and Crete. It was now training for desert warfare and constructing defensive positions around the Baggush Box, about 150 kilometres (93 mi) west of El Alamein. During this time he participated in a divisional swimming competition, winning the freestyle 50 yards (46 m) race. In November he, along with the rest of the division, participated in Operation Crusader. After crossing the Egyptian border into Libya, this involved near-constant fighting for well over a month, during which Manahi, with two others, captured and commandeered a German tank which had become stuck in B Company's trenches. He drove the tank during an engagement with elements of the 21st Panzer Division on 26 November, helping capture an enemy field gun. In early 1942, the New Zealanders were withdrawn to Syria for a period of rest and garrison duty.

In late May 1942, the Panzer Army Africa, commanded by Generaloberst (colonel general) Erwin Rommel, attacked into Libya. The 2nd Division was rushed back from Syria and dug in at Minqar Qaim. Encircled by the Germans during the Battle of Mersa Matruh, the division was forced to break out from Minqar Qaim on 26 June and withdrew to positions around El Alamein in Egypt. Here, suffering regular artillery barrages, it dug in to await an expected attack. By late August, no attack had been launched and it was decided a raid for prisoners would be undertaken by two companies, one of them being Manahi's B Company. This was successfully executed on 26 August, with over 40 enemy soldiers made prisoners of war. The next month, the battalion was taken out of the line for a brief period of rest before returning for the Second Battle of El Alamein. During the fourth stage of the battle, in what was codenamed Operation Supercharge, Manahi and his company were involved in a successful bayonet charge against well dug-in Germans that had resisted a previous attack by another battalion.

By now, it was clear that the Germans were in retreat and the Allies pursued them into Libya and Tunisia. After a battle at Tebaga Gap, during which Second Lieutenant Moana-Nui-a-Kiwa Ngarimu of the Māori Battalion's C Company won the Victoria Cross (VC), planning began for a push into Tunis, the capital city of Tunisia. Before this could be achieved, a defensive line around Enfidaville needed to be broken.

=== Takrouna ===
By April 1943, the 2nd New Zealand Division had advanced into mountainous country overlooking Enfidaville. Takrouna was a hill, about 1,000 feet (300 m) high, held by soldiers of the Italian Trieste Division's I/66° Battalion, and a German platoon. A village was situated on the summit of the hill with a prominent ledge to one side. The Māori Battalion was tasked by Brigadier Howard Kippenberger, the acting commander of the 2nd New Zealand Division, with the capture of Takrouna. B Company would make the main assault on 19 April, with C and D companies on the flanks. The initial attack petered out due to heavy machine gun fire from the enemy. The battalion's commander, Lieutenant Colonel Charles Bennett, ordered Manahi to take a party of 12 men to make a feint attack while the remainder of B Company linked up with C Company. The party split into two sections, with one under the command of Manahi, newly promoted to lance sergeant. At dawn, they began their attack up a steep and at times near sheer slope and were successfully able to overwhelm the Italians defending the ledge, capturing 60 prisoners. The New Zealanders then dug in and prepared for a counter-attack. Artillery and mortar fire killed half of the platoon, including its commander. This left Manahi, as the senior non-commissioned officer, in charge.

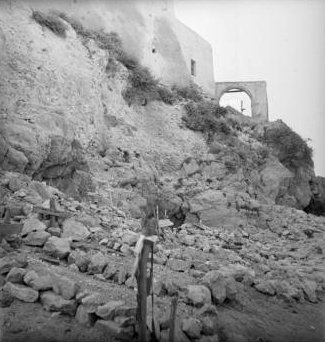
The upper slopes of Takrouna, Tunisia, on 1 June 1943, with graves in the foreground. This photograph gives an indication of the difficult terrain over which Manahi had led his men

With two attempts to contact the battalion having failed, Manahi made his way down Takrouna to locate reinforcements and supplies. Ignoring an officer's advice that he abandon the ledge, he returned with a section from C Company as well as ammunition and stretcher-bearers. A further platoon arrived to help consolidate the position. The expected counter-attack commenced and was successfully beaten off. It was only then, after having been on Takrouna for 16 hours, that Manahi and what was left of his section withdrew, leaving the newly arrived platoon to hold the ledge.

Despite reinforcements, a further counter-attack launched by Italian forces on 21 April dislodged the New Zealanders and control of the ledge was lost. Kippenberger ordered the Māori Battalion to send reinforcements to rectify the situation. Manahi was specifically requested to join the effort to recapture the ledge due to his knowledge of the terrain. He went with a group of volunteers to regain the lost position and, with artillery support, the attack was successful. By midday, the ledge was reoccupied by the New Zealanders but the village on the summit remained in the hands of the Italians. Later in the afternoon of 21 April, Manahi led an attacking party of seven soldiers which, working with a group from 21st Battalion, captured the village and took 300 prisoners. After the battle, and with Takrouna secure, he assisted with the recovery of the bodies of his dead comrades.

Manahi's exploits quickly became known throughout the 2nd New Zealand Division, and within a few days of his actions, a nomination for the VC had been prepared by the commander of his battalion. Brigadier Ralph Harding, commander of 5th Infantry Brigade, endorsed the nomination as did four senior officers: Kippenberger, Lieutenant General Bernard Freyberg, the acting commander of X Corps, General Bernard Montgomery, the commander of the Eighth Army, and General Harold Alexander, the commander of 18th Army Group. General Henry Maitland Wilson, commander-in-chief of Middle East Command, likewise endorsed the award after considering the evidence. When the nomination reached the Army Council in London, the award was downgraded to an immediate Distinguished Conduct Medal (DCM). Who authorised the downgrade is not clear, but historian Paul Moon notes that it was most likely that only the Chief of the General Staff, General Alan Brooke, had the seniority to do so, given the individuals who had endorsed the VC recommendation. Manahi's DCM was duly gazetted on 22 July 1943.

The citation for the DCM read:

On the night of 19–20 April 1943 during the attack upon the Takrouna feature, Tunisia, Lance Sergeant Manahi was in command of a section. The objective of his platoon was the pinnacle, a platform of rock right on top of the feature. By morning the platoon was reduced in strength to ten by heavy mortar and small-arms fire and were pinned to the ground a short way up the feature. The platoon continued towards their objective, Lance Sergeant Manahi leading a party of three up the western side. During this advance, they encountered heavy machine-gun fire from posts on the slope and extensive sniping from the enemy actually on the pinnacle. In order to reach their objective, he and his party had to climb some 500 feet under heavy fire, the last 50 feet being almost sheer. He personally led the party after silencing several machine-gun posts and by climbing hand-over-fist they eventually reached the pinnacle. After a brief fight some sixty enemies, including an artillery observation officer, surrendered. They were then joined by the remainder of the platoon and the pinnacle was captured.

The area was subjected to intense mortar fire from a considerable enemy force still holding Takrouna Village and the northern and western slopes of the feature and later to heavy and continuous shelling. The Platoon Sergeant was killed and other casualties reduced the party holding the pinnacle to Lance Sergeant Manahi and two Privates. An artillery observation officer who had arrived ordered him to withdraw but he and his men remained and held the feature. This action was confirmed by Brigade Headquarters as soon as communications were established. Late morning found the party short of ammunition, rations and water. Lance Sergeant Manahi himself returned to his Battalion at the foot of the feature and brought back supplies and reinforcements, the whole time being under fire. During the afternoon the enemy counter-attacked in force, some of them gaining a foothold. In the face of grenades and small-arms fire he personally led his men against the attackers. Fierce hand-to-hand fighting ensued but eventually, the attackers were driven off. Shortly after this, the party was relieved. The following morning urgent and immediate reinforcements were required as the enemy had once more gained a foothold and Lance Sergeant Manahi led one of two parties which attacked and drove back the enemy despite concentrated mortar and heavy machine-gun fire. All that day the feature was heavily shelled, mortared and subjected to continual machine-gun fire from in and about Takrouna. Late in the afternoon of 21 April, Lance Sergeant Manahi on his own initiative took two men and moved around the north-western side of the feature. In that area were several enemies machine-gun and mortar posts and two 25-pounder guns operated by the enemy. With cool determination Lance Sergeant Manahi led his party against them, stalking one post after another always under the shell and machine-gun fire. By his skill and daring, he compelled the surrender of the enemy in that area.

This courageous action undoubtedly led to the ultimate collapse of the enemy defence and the capture of the whole Takrouna feature with over 300 prisoners, two 25-pounder guns, several mortars and seventy-two machine guns. On the night of 21–22 April, Lance Sergeant Manahi remained on the feature assisting in the evacuation of the dead and wounded and refused to return to his Battalion until this task was completed. During that time the area was being heavily and continually shelled.

Throughout the action, Lance Sergeant Manahi showed the highest qualities of an infantry soldier. He made a supreme contribution to the capture and holding of a feature vital to the success of the operation.

The decision to downgrade the VC recommendation to an award of the DCM was a disappointment to many in the 2nd New Zealand Division. Even outside of the division there was some surprise; the British lieutenant-general Brian Horrocks, who was present during the fighting at Takrouna and visited the site of the action afterwards, expressed his dismay at the downgrade of Manahi's award in his postwar memoirs. Reports that Manahi's men had killed Italians attempting to surrender were thought by some historians to be a factor in the downgrading of his award. The official history of the Māori Battalion, published in 1956, stated that the surrendering soldiers were "shot, bayonetted or thrown over a cliff" but only after an Italian grenade had been thrown into a building in which wounded New Zealanders were sheltering. However, these reports may not have emerged until after the downgrading, and at the time the killings were alleged to have occurred, Manahi himself was reportedly dealing with an advance by Italian soldiers against the ledge. Another factor in the downgrading may have been the recent VC nomination for Ngarimu, just three weeks earlier. The subsequent nomination of Manahi, a Māori like Ngarimu and from the same battalion, may have led to a perception that VCs were being too easily awarded.

=== Return to New Zealand ===
The surrender of the Axis forces in Tunisia in May left the Allies in control of North Africa. The 2nd New Zealand Division withdrew to its base in Egypt and it was announced that 6,000 of its personnel would return to New Zealand for a three-month furlough. Manahi, as one of around 180 surviving original members of the Māori Battalion, was among those selected and shipped out on 15 June 1943. He was not to return to the war; after many of those on furlough vocalised their displeasure at the prospect of going back to war while other able-bodied men had yet to serve in the military, the New Zealand Government decided to exempt certain long-serving personnel from a return to duty. Māori soldiers, such as Manahi, would be among those released from service.

On returning to Rotorua, Manahi entered a woodworking course and then began working at the local hospital as a carpenter. On 18 December 1945, he was presented with his DCM by Cyril Newall, the Governor-General of New Zealand, in a ceremony at the Auckland Town Hall. He was later selected for the New Zealand Victory Contingent, destined for England to celebrate the Commonwealth's role in the war. As part of the contingent, he participated in the Victory Parade in London on 8 June 1946. This fulfilled his last military obligations, and he was discharged in August.

== Later life ==
Manahi settled back in Rotorua and returned to the workforce. Employed by the Ministry of Works, he became a traffic inspector which involved travelling around the Bay of Plenty. By this time, he had become estranged from his wife, although the couple never divorced. Manahi later had relationships with other women, and fathered another son with one of them.

A keen sportsman, he became involved in swimming coaching as well as golf and fishing. When his estranged wife died in 1976, he moved away from Rotorua to nearby Maketu, on the coast. He still commuted to Rotorua to socialise at the local branch of the New Zealand Returned Servicemen's Association (RSA). Following his retirement in 1978, he spent even more time at the RSA in Rotorua. On the evening of 29 March 1986, on the way home to Maketu from the RSA clubrooms, he was involved in a car crash. His car veered over the centre line of the road, hit an oncoming vehicle and flipped. The driver and passenger of the other vehicle went to Manahi's aid. He received severe chest and abdominal injuries and was rushed to Tauranga Hospital, where he died later in the evening. His tangi (funeral) was held at the marae (tribal meeting area) in his home village of Ohinemutu, and was attended by former soldiers of the Māori Battalion. Survived by his two sons, he was buried at Muruika cemetery.

== The Manahi VC award ==
The situation regarding Manahi's VC recommendation for his actions at Takrouna still rankled with many members of the Māori lions but while he was alive, Manahi's modesty and unwillingness to bring any attention to himself meant that he was not interested in pursuing reconsideration of the award. Following his death, the Manahi VC Committee was established by his former comrades and iwi to lobby for an upgrade to his award.

The committee, which felt the downgrade of Manahi's proposed VC award to a DCM was due to him being a Māori, lobbied the New Zealand Government to make representations to Buckingham Palace. It was hoped that Queen Elizabeth II would reconsider the case and make a posthumous grant of the VC to Manahi. This was despite the Queen's father, King George VI, having ruled in 1949 that no further awards from the Second World War ought to be made. The New Zealand Government was reluctant to be officially involved, fearing an outright rejection if formal approaches were made. It favoured a more gradual and casual method to better assess the likely receptiveness of the Palace to the issue and so supported two informal applications made to the Queen in the early 1990s through former governors-general of New Zealand; these were unsuccessful, with the passage of time since the events of Takrouna cited as a factor.

Further agitation by the committee for an official approach to be made to the Queen resulted in a formal application to the Government in late 1993. This was rejected, one reason cited being the alleged conduct of the Māori soldiers towards Italian prisoners at Takrouna. This provoked the committee to collect more evidence in support of its case, including rebuttal evidence regarding the treatment of the Italians. It also stressed the point that the Manahi case was one of rectifying an error made by the military authorities to downgrade the VC to a DCM. It was not a matter of an attempt to see a soldier awarded a medal he had been overlooked for, as was alleged by military historian Christopher Pugsley. Finally, in 1997, the then Prime Minister of New Zealand, Jenny Shipley, formally broached the subject with Buckingham Palace. The feedback indicated the elapsed time since the events of Takrouna was a barrier to awarding Manahi a VC.

The campaign to seek redress for Manahi continued and in 2000, his iwi, Te Arawa, lodged a claim with the Waitangi Tribunal and was supported in doing so by the New Zealand RSA. Te Arawa alleged the failure of the New Zealand Government to give full consideration of the award of a VC to Manahi constituted a breach of the Treaty of Waitangi, which required the government to act in good faith regarding grievances of Māori. In December 2005 the tribunal reported that there was no breach of the treaty. While not making any formal conclusions or recommendations, the tribunal suggested that the Manahi VC Committee work with the New Zealand Government in making an approach to Buckingham Palace.

In October 2006, after further dialogue with Buckingham Palace, the New Zealand minister of defence, Phil Goff, announced that Manahi's bravery at Takrouna would be recognised by the presentation of an altar cloth for use at St. Faith's Church at Ohinemutu, a personal letter from the Queen acknowledging his gallantry, and a ceremonial sword. The award was presented by Prince Andrew to Manahi's sons, Rauawa and Geoffrey, at a ceremony in Rotorua on 17 March 2007. The sword was later presented to the Chief of the New Zealand Defence Force, Lieutenant General Jerry Mateparae, along with a patu (war club) in memory of Haane Manahi.

Manahi is the subject of the documentary film Sgt. Haane, which was released on 23 April 2026, after commemorative screenings from 20 April, including on Anzac Day. The documentary, titled Sgt. Haane, is directed by Tearepa Kahi. One of Manahi's nieces, Dr Donna Morrison, is a producer, and contributed to the film content, alongside other descendants of Māori Battalion members.
