= Arapeta Awatere =

Māori military hero

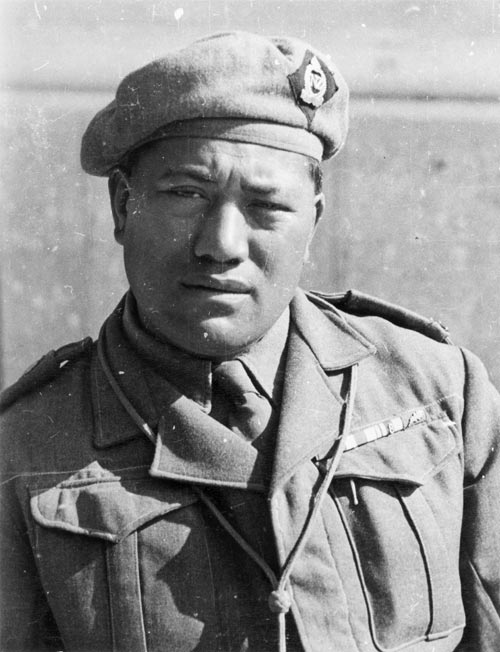
- Awatere in 1945
- Born: 25 April 1910; Tūpāroa, Gisborne District, New Zealand
- Died: 6 March 1976 (aged 65); Mount Eden Prison, Auckland, New Zealand
- Military career
- Allegiance: New Zealand
- Branch: New Zealand Military Forces
- Service years: 1928– c. 1945
- Rank: Lieutenant Colonel
- Commands: Māori Battalion (1944–45)
- Conflicts: Second World War; North African campaign; Second Battle of El Alamein; Italian campaign
- Awards: Distinguished Service Order; Military Cross

Arapeta Marukitepua Pitapitanuiārangi Awatere DSO, MC (25 April 1910 – 6 March 1976) was a scholar, decorated military leader, Māori welfare officer, writer, linguist, and local politician. He served in the Māori Battalion from 1940 to 1945, commanding C Company at the Battle of Tebaga Gap in 1943 and later leading the battalion in Italy. He was awarded the Military Cross and the Distinguished Service Order for bravery and leadership.

After the war he became a prominent civic figure, teaching and advocating for Māori language and culture. He also wrote poetry and translated literary works into Māori, with some of his early poems appearing in Te Ao Hou in 1959. Despite later health struggles, including the effects of a stroke and diabetes, Awatere remained active as a teacher and writer.

In 1969, following the murder of his mistress’s lover, he was imprisoned at Mount Eden Prison, where he continued to write and teach until his death in 1976.

Sir Peter Williams QC described him as “one of the great New Zealanders of all time.”

== Early life ==
Born in Tūpāroa, on the East Coast of New Zealand, on 25 April 1910, Arapeta Marukitepua Pitapitanuiārangi Awatere was the son of Petuere Wī Hēkopa Awatere, a farmer, and his wife Hēni Hautao. Through his father, he was affiliated with the Te Whānau-a-Hinetāpora hapū (sub-tribe) of Ngāti Porou, and with the Ngāti Hine iwi via his mother. His early years were spent in Northland, at his mother's marae at Whangaruru, before he returned to the East Coast at the age of 6.

His paternal family supervised his education, ensuring that Awatere was immersed in Māori tradition and arts. He became highly skilled in Māori weaponry, particularly the taiaha (staff weapon). Educated at local schools, he proceeded to Te Aute College in Hawke’s Bay for his secondary schooling. As his parents had died by this time, he worked as a sailor during the holiday periods to pay his tuition.

Awatere gained an interpreter qualification in Māori in 1925 and once he completed his education three years later, joined the Native Department. He also joined the Territorial Force, immersing himself in military history. For his work, he was based in Rotorua initially and then Wellington. In 1931 he married Elsie Bella Rogers, who was of the Ngāti Whakaue iwi. The couple had five daughters. That he never had a son was a source of disappointment to him; his youngest daughter, Donna Awatere Huata, was born in 1949 and later wrote that after her birth, her father left the family for two years. In 1933, he returned to the East Coast, settling at Gisborne.

== Second World War ==
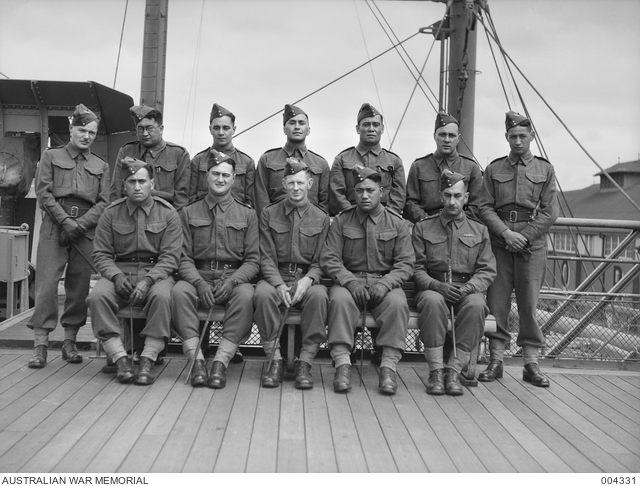
Group portrait of officers of the 28th Māori Battalion, 2nd NZEF, taken in Sydney, 14 November 1940. Lieutenant A. Awatere is seated front row, second from right. Source: Australian War Memorial (Accession 004331).

Awatere enlisted in the 28th Māori Battalion on the outbreak of the Second World War, and commenced training in January 1940. Identified early on as a potential officer, he was commissioned in March. Instead of proceeding overseas with the battalion he was held back as an instructor for the following Māori reinforcements. He eventually was sent to Egypt in November 1940 and in June 1941, after the conclusion of the campaign in Crete, rejoined the 28th Battalion. Awatere was appointed the battalion's intelligence officer in November 1941. At the end of the month he was attached to the headquarters of 6th Brigade to perform a similar role there. In June 1942 he was appointed commander of the battalion's D Company. The following year he was awarded the Military Cross.

=== Battle for Point 209 ===
As commander of C Company, Awatere took part in the Battle of Tebaga Gap—specifically, the assault on Point 209, a decisive phase of the Tunisian campaign and the Allied attempt to breach the Mareth Line. Prior to the attack, the Tairāwhiti officers, including Awatere, Lieutenant Ngarimu, and Pine Taiapa, had written to Sir Āpirana Ngata expressing deep concern for the heavy losses among the men of C Company. The letter, dated 18 February 1943, arrived in New Zealand only after news reached Ngata of the deaths of Ngarimu and twenty-two others at Point 209.

Much of the modern understanding of the engagement derives from Monty Soutar’s Ngā Tama Toa: The Price of Citizenship (2008), which draws on oral testimony and battalion records. According to Soutar, as well as Awatere’s memoir Awatere: A Soldier’s Story (1974) and J. F. Cody’s official battalion history (1956), the attack began with C Company ordered to seize a forward ridge—later nicknamed Hikurangi—which was mistakenly identified as Point 209. Faulty intelligence left the Māori troops exposed on the lower slope while more heavily armed German Panzer Grenadiers held the true crest of Point 209 behind them.

Leading from the front, Awatere personally directed the advance under fire, signalling movements by whistle and hand. Ngarimu led 14 Platoon in a charge that destroyed two German machine-gun posts and captured the crest of Hikurangi. Through the night of 26–27 March, C Company repelled repeated counter-attacks at close quarters, using rifles, bayonets, grenades, and even stones when ammunition ran out. Ngarimu, twice wounded, refused evacuation and continued to lead; Awatere, also wounded, remained in command until relieved the following morning. Of the 98 men who advanced, 22 were killed and almost all the remainder wounded.

Their defence of Hikurangi enabled the New Zealand Division to break through the Tebaga Gap and open the way for the Eighth Army’s advance on the Mareth Line. Ngarimu was posthumously awarded the Victoria Cross—the first Māori recipient—while Awatere received the Military Cross and Colonel Charles Bennett the Distinguished Service Order.

=== Italy and Command ===
Following the Tunisian campaign, the battalion joined the Italian Campaign in October 1943, fighting at Orsogna, Cassino, Florence, and Faenza. Awatere was appointed commanding officer of the 28th Battalion in July 1944, succeeding Lieutenant Colonel R. Young who had taken ill, serving in this capacity for two months until Young’s return to duty. Awatere reverted to second-in-command of the unit. On 18 November 1944 Young stood down as commander as he was returning to New Zealand on furlough; Awatere, now a lieutenant colonel, resumed command of the battalion. In recognition of his services during the campaign in Italy, he was awarded the Distinguished Service Order (DSO). According to another member of the battalion, Awatere gave a speech after being presented with the DSO, during which he stressed that his award belonged to all the battalion, not himself. Following the end of the war in Europe, Awatere relinquished command in June 1945 and returned to New Zealand.

== Later life ==
Arapeta Awatere in Auckland, c. 1960s. Courtesy of the Alexander Turnbull Library, Wellington, New Zealand. Licensed for non-commercial use with attribution.

After his return to New Zealand in August 1945, Awatere spent two years travelling with Eruera Stirling, visiting hundreds of marae to honour members of the 28th (Māori) Battalion who had been killed during the war. Following this commemorative tour, he undertook two rituals of purification that were intended to release him from the effects of warfare.

In 1948–49 Awatere established a short-lived seafood business before rejoining the renamed Department of Māori Affairs. He completed university courses in anthropology, philosophy and Māori language in the early 1950s, and undertook extensive research into Māori history and ethnography. From 1953 he served as a Māori district welfare officer in Whanganui, then Rotorua from 1958, and Auckland from 1959.

Awatere became known for his personal commitment to community welfare, often using his own salary to support families in need, and providing clothing or financial help. Alongside his government service, he led the haka group Maranga and the Aotearoa Folklore Society, which performed nationally and toured Samoa and the Cook Islands. He was elected to the Auckland City Council in 1962, serving until 1969, and in 1963 he was chosen to perform the ceremonial challenge with his taiaha before Elizabeth II at Waitangi, an honour that moved him deeply.

At home, Awatere spent much of his time composing choral works on the piano and writing poetry in Māori and English. He was strongly committed to the Māori language, preferring the use of double or triple vowels instead of macrons, and he devoted himself to the study of whakapapa and tribal history. He composed numerous waiata, which he would chant during long journeys to hui around the country.

By the mid-1960s Awatere’s health had begun to deteriorate. He suffered a stroke and was later diagnosed with diabetes, which caused lasting physical damage. Although he retired from formal public service, he continued to advise Māori organisations and to mentor younger Māori leaders, and this work continued while he was imprisoned.

During this period Awatere wrote and compiled Awatere: A Soldier’s Story, a collection containing more than one hundred poems and waiata in te reo Māori and English translation, together with essays, speeches and letters. Many of the poems include his notes or contextual explanations, and further verse appears throughout the book. According to his daughter, he also kept extensive journals and manuscripts, but these were later lost in a flood that destroyed much of his unpublished work.

=== Trial and conviction ===
Although married, Awatere maintained a long-term relationship with Tuini Hākaraia, a union his wife Elsie was aware of and which he is said to have regarded as consistent with traditional Māori custom (wahine punarua – secondary or de facto wife).

In the days leading up to 3 August 1969, he told friends and a church colleague, the Reverend Wī Huata, that he had experienced several rehu (premonitions) that Hākaraia was in danger. He sought Huata’s advice that evening, but the minister was unavailable, and Awatere later told him he had felt compelled to check on her welfare.

Unable to sleep, Awatere wrote a short letter to Hākaraia expressing affection and concern and decided to deliver it in person. Shortly after midnight he drove to her home in Te Atatū, carrying his overcoat and a small knife he habitually kept in its pocket. According to his later statement, he entered the house noisily and was confronted by Hākaraia’s new partner, Hendrikus Gerardus Vunderink. He said that Vunderink struck him on the head, causing him to lose consciousness, and that when he regained awareness Vunderink was lying on the floor with fatal stab wounds.

Awatere telephoned the police to report the incident, then immediately phoned his wife. When officers arrived, he was arrested at the scene without being asked for a formal statement. Family accounts later claimed that his explanation was never recorded at the time of arrest.

During his trial later that year, the Crown alleged that Awatere had gone to the address armed with a knife, indicating intent to kill. The defence presented medical evidence that he had suffered a serious stroke three months earlier, leaving him partially paralysed and prone to cognitive lapses, and that he was also suffering from undiagnosed diabetes. Defence psychiatrists Dr Laurie Gluckman and Dr Henry Bennett testified that the combined effects of those conditions could have produced a state of automatism—a temporary loss of conscious control. The prosecution’s medical witnesses, Dr Eyre and Dr Savage, accepted that his stroke and diabetes would have seriously affected his mental capacity but argued that they made him more easily provoked and less capable of rational judgment, rather than unconscious of his actions.

Despite this evidence, a jury found him guilty of murder, and he was sentenced to life imprisonment. His appeal to the Court of Appeal was dismissed, and although his lawyers considered taking the case to the Privy Council, the cost placed it beyond reach.

=== Imprisonment and later calls for review ===
While serving his sentence in Mount Eden Prison, Awatere remained active in promoting Māori language and culture. He taught te reo and haka to other inmates, wrote essays and poetry, and maintained a disciplined exercise routine despite ongoing health problems. He was regularly visited by Dr Gluckman, who had testified for the defence and later described him as “a man of intellect, discipline, and humility.” Visitors such as Dr Pita Sharples and Dr Mervyn McLean recalled his mentorship and dignity within the prison community.

His family and supporters have consistently maintained that he was wrongfully convicted, citing medical evidence of diminished responsibility, the composition of the jury, and reports that one juror was acquainted with the deceased. In later decades, his granddaughter Hinemoa Awatere published an essay, "The Official Story is Wrong" (2015), reiterating the family’s view that his conviction represented a miscarriage of justice. Prominent lawyer Sir Peter Williams QC, who had represented Awatere at trial, later referred to the case as “a travesty” and called for a posthumous review. He also described Awatere as “one of the great New Zealanders of all time.”

Near the end of his sentence, there were renewed appeals from community leaders for clemency or retrial, but before any formal action could be taken he died suddenly of a heart attack on 6 March 1976, just weeks before he was due for parole.

After an extended funeral cortège with stops at several marae along its route, he was buried at Waitetoki, at Tūpāroa near Ruatoria on the East Coast. He was survived by his wife and five daughters, including Donna Awatere Huata, who was a member of parliament for a time.

== Literary work ==
Alongside his military and civic careers, Awatere was an accomplished writer and linguist whose poetry, translations, and essays reflected his commitment to Māori language and cultural philosophy. His posthumously published autobiography, Awatere: A Soldier’s Story, brought together decades of writing, blending personal reflection with scholarship and oratory.

Doug Munro, in his 2002 review of the autobiography Awatere: A Soldier’s Story, described it as “too big and uncoordinated” and “an uneasy mix of outright autobiography with commentary and analysis.” As a historian trained to seek linear historical detail and documentation, Munro found the work lacking in clarity.

Writing in a review of Murray Edmond’s Time to Make a Song and Dance: Cultural revolt in Auckland in the 1960s, David Eggleton observed that the book encapsulates Awatere as “a complex, tragic figure”.

His poetry appeared in leading journals including Te Ao Hou and New Quarterly Cave, and several of his Māori-language poems were later republished in national anthologies such as Into the World of Light (1982), The Penguin Book of New Zealand Verse (1985), and Te Ao Mārama: Contemporary Māori Writing (1992). Despite this, his work was often excluded from mid-century English-language anthologies because he wrote primarily in Māori.
