= Māori Battalion =

WW2 infantry battalion of the New Zealand Army

28th (Māori) Battalion
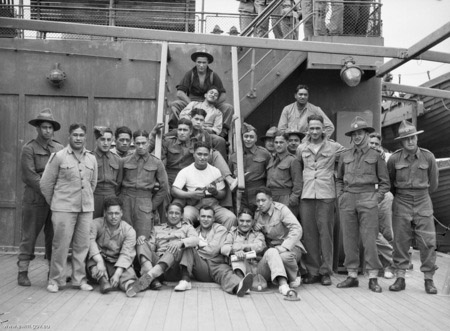
- Reinforcements for the Māori Battalion arrive in Sydney, Australia in November 1940
- Active: 1940–1946
- Country: New Zealand
- Branch: New Zealand Army
- Type: Light infantry
- Size: ~3000–3600 men
- Part of: 2nd New Zealand Division
- Nickname: Te Hokowhitu a Tū (Māori)
- Mottos: Ake! Ake! Kia Kaha E! (Upwards, upwards, be strong!)
- Engagements: Second World War: Greek campaign; Battle of Crete; North African Campaign; Italian campaign

Commanders
- Notable commanders: Fred Baker; Charles Bennett; Arapeta Awatere

The 28th (Māori) Battalion, more commonly known as the Māori Battalion (Māori: Te Hokowhitu a Tū), was a light infantry battalion of the New Zealand Army that served during the Second World War.

The battalion was formed following pressure on the Labour government from some Māori Members of Parliament (MPs) and Māori organisations throughout the country wanting to see a full Māori unit raised for service overseas. The Māori Pioneer Battalion was formed to serve in the First World War (1914–1918). Māori wanted the formation of a distinct military unit in order to raise their profile, and to serve alongside their European compatriots as part of the British Empire. It also offered Māori the opportunity to prove themselves and potentially secure autonomy.

In 1940, the 28th Maori Battalion was established as part of the Second New Zealand Expeditionary Force (2NZEF). The battalion was attached to the 2nd New Zealand Division and moved between the division's three infantry brigades. The battalion fought during the Greek, North African and Italian campaigns, earning a formidable reputation as a fighting force which both Allied and German commanders have acknowledged. It became the most-decorated New Zealand battalion during the war. Following the end of hostilities, the battalion contributed a contingent of personnel to serve in Japan as part of the British Commonwealth Occupation Force before being disbanded in January 1946.

== History ==
=== Formation ===
The 28th (Māori) Battalion had its origins before the start of the Second World War. In mid-1939, as war in Europe began to be seen as inevitable, Sir Āpirana Ngata started to discuss proposals for the formation of a military unit made up of Māori volunteers similar to the Māori Pioneer Battalion that had served during the First World War. This proposal was furthered by two Māori MPs, Eruera Tirikātene and Paraire Paikea, and from this support within the Māori community for the idea began to grow as it was seen as an opportunity for Māori to participate as citizens of the British Empire. According to historian Claudia Orange, the act of raising the battalion was seen as offering the chance to "prove the worth of Maoridom...and even secure the long-term goal of Maori autonomy". At first the New Zealand government was hesitant, but on 4 October, the decision was announced that the proposal would be accepted and that the battalion would be raised in addition to the nine battalions and support units that had already been formed into three brigades of the 2nd New Zealand Division.

Nevertheless, it was decided that the battalion's key positions, including its officers, non-commissioned officers (NCOs) and signallers, would initially be filled largely by New Zealanders of European descent. This decision was met with some consternation, so assurances were made that over time suitable Māori candidates would take over these positions. In this regard, it was decided that the battalion's first commanding officer would be a regular officer, Major George Dittmer—later promoted to lieutenant colonel in January 1940—and that his second-in-command would be a Reserve officer, Lieutenant Colonel George Bertrand, a man of Māori descent who would take up the position with the rank of major. Both men were veterans of the First World War and had considerable experience.

Almost immediately effort was focused on selecting and identifying the officers and NCOs. To this end volunteers were called for among units that had already formed as part of the 2nd New Zealand Expeditionary Force (2NZEF) and from new recruits. At the end of November, 146 trainees reported to the Army School at Trentham, where even serving officers and NCOs were required to prove their suitability for positions in the new battalion. Concurrently, recruiting of men to fill the other ranks positions began in early October and within three weeks nearly 900 men had enlisted. The process was carried out by recruiting officers who worked closely with tribal authorities, and the recruits were restricted to single men aged between 21 and 35, although later married men were allowed to join, but only if they did not have more than two children of similar ages.

On 26 January 1940, the battalion came together for the first time, marking its official raising at the Palmerston North Show Grounds. Upon formation it was decided that the battalion would be organised upon tribal lines. The unit consisted of a headquarters company and four rifle companies, designated 'A' through 'D': 'A' Company (Kamupene ā – Ngā Kiri Kapia – the Gumdiggers) was recruited from the Northland to Auckland; 'B' Company (Kamupene B – Ngā Ruku Kapa – Penny Divers) from Rotorua, the Bay of Plenty and Thames–Coromandel; 'C' Company (Kamupene C – Ngā kaupoi – The Cowboys) from the East Coast from Gisborne to East Cape and 'D' Company (Ngāti Walkabout) from Waikato, Maniapoto, Hawkes Bay, Wellington and the South Island, as well as some Pacific Islands and the Chatham and Stewart Islands.

February saw the issuing of equipment and the commencement of training; punctuated by medical inspections and dental treatment as well as ceremonial duties surrounding the commemoration of the Treaty of Waitangi. A lack of previous experience in technical trades also hampered the battalion's training, as the unit was short of men who were able to serve in roles such as clerks, drivers and signallers – most personnel were drawn from mainly rural backgrounds. Consequently, candidates for these roles had to be trained from scratch. The organisation of the battalion was finally completed in March, when the men were allocated to their respective companies, and on 13 March 1940 the 28th (Māori) Battalion was declared on active service. After 14 days of leave, the battalion conducted a five-week concentration period before embarking on 1 May 1940. The battalion's strength at this time was 39 officers and 642 other ranks.

=== United Kingdom ===
Sailing upon the Aquitania via Fremantle and Cape Town, the battalion arrived at Gourock, Scotland, after six weeks at sea. Initially they had been destined to join the rest of the 2nd New Zealand Division in the Middle East, but due to concerns about a possible invasion of the United Kingdom by the German Wehrmacht, the decision was made to divert the division's second echelon, a brigade-sized force that included the 28th (Māori) Battalion, to Britain to help bolster the island's defences.

In late June or early July 1940, the 28th (Māori) Battalion was attached to a mixed brigade under Brigadier Harold Barrowclough. During this time they manned defences in the south of England and undertook further training. The battalion suffered from a lack of equipment, largely due to the priority given to re-equip British units following the losses suffered by the British Expeditionary Force in France, and consequently, training was largely focused upon anti-gas procedures and route marching. On 6 July they were inspected by King George VI and he was said to have been impressed by the "smartness of the close order and arms drill of the Maori Battalion" and "by the fine physique, keenness and determined demeanour" of the men.

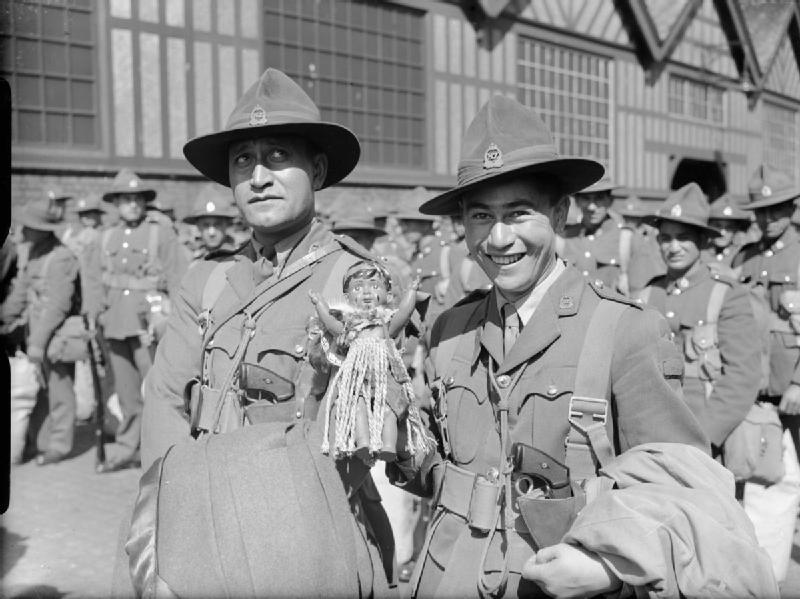
Maori Battalion officers arriving at Gourock, Scotland on 17 June 1940

Shortly afterwards the Mixed Brigade began quick deployment and defensive manoeuvres in earnest, as fears of invasion grew. In between exercises, further training was undertaken and the battalion also worked to improve fixed defences throughout July, August and into September. These exercises varied in size from company to battalion-level, and involved differing scenarios and enemy forces. In September, a divisional review was undertaken and amidst massive German air raids upon London, the New Zealanders were declared to be ready for front-line service in the event of a German landing. Warning orders for deployment to Egypt were cancelled and the New Zealanders were placed under command of XII Corps, taking up defensive positions in the Folkestone–Dover region.

In October, the Māori Battalion was attached to "Milforce", under Dittmer's command, along with a squadron of tanks, a squadron of cavalry and a medium machine gun company. The following month, with an invasion now considered unlikely, the battalion returned to Aldershot for the winter, remaining there for two months. During this time-limited training was undertaken, although upon invitation the battalion fielded a rugby team against a Welsh side at Langley Park, losing 12–3. Later in the month, the battalion received the order to begin preparing for redeployment to Egypt and an advance party was dispatched in mid-December. On 7 January 1941 the rest of the battalion left for the Middle East, embarking from Liverpool on the Athlone Castle.

=== Middle East ===
After sailing via Freetown, Cape Town and Durban, the Athlone Castle sailed up the east coast of Africa and entered the Suez Canal, arriving at Tewfik harbour on 3 March 1941. In the afternoon the battalion entrained and two days later they arrived in the desert, where they were met by motor transport which carried them to camp Garawi, about 20 miles (32 km) from Cairo. At this point they were met by about 300 reinforcements which were used to replace men who had been laid down with influenza and to bring the battalion up to a higher establishment. Shortly afterwards they were moved to Alexandria, where they embarked on the Cameronia, bound for Greece.

=== Greece ===
On 6 April the German invasion of Greece and Yugoslavia began. In order to help defend Greece, a composite force of three divisions of Australian, British and New Zealand troops were to be deployed, and were grouped together under the title of 'W' Force. However, by the time the invasion began only two of the three divisions had arrived, and the New Zealanders were consequently spread thin, holding a position to the north of Katerini, where they were tasked to defend the strategic Olympus Pass to the south. During this time, the 28th (Māori) Battalion was attached to the 5th Infantry Brigade, which was later grouped with other Australian and New Zealand units to form the Anzac Corps. Vastly outnumbered, within two days the situation for the Allies worsened, as the Germans broke through the defences along the Bulgarian border and the Yugoslav resistance collapsed. As the situation worsened, orders came down from brigade headquarters that the passes would be held "to the last man and last round".

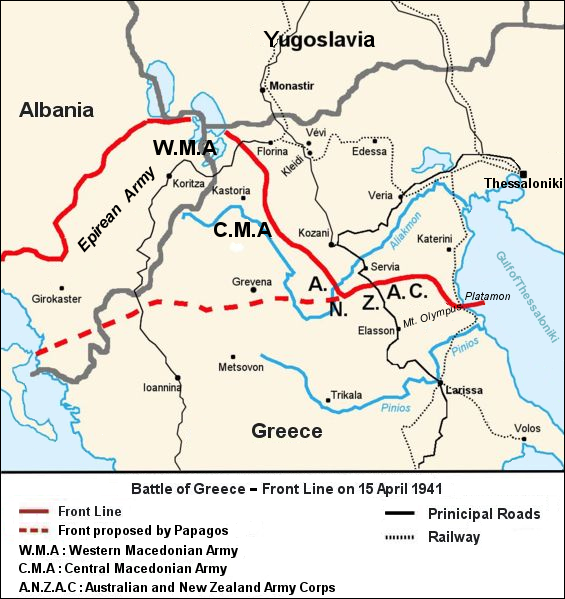
Map depicting relative positions on 15 April 1941

On 9 April, the fall of Salonika precipitated the order for the battalion to withdraw from their positions at Katerini south to Olympus. As events unfolded elsewhere, the battalion remained in position, digging in and constructing defences until 12 April when they were ordered to withdraw behind Mavroneri Gorge and reposition themselves on the western aspect. At this time the 5th Infantry Brigade's orders were changed from a holding action to a delay and withdrawal. It was in the Petra Pass, alongside the 22nd Battalion, that the 28th Battalion fought its first engagement of the war. In preparation for the coming attack, the Māori built their position, running out barbed and concertina wire and digging in while German bombers droned overhead. During the night they carried out patrols along the Mavroneri riverbed, but no contact was made. The following morning, the divisional cavalry, which had been carrying out a rearguard action, conducted a withdrawal through the battalion's position, making the Māori Battalion the most forward Allied unit. As German forces were halted at Platamon by the 21st Battalion, thrusts towards Larisa once again put the battalion's position in doubt and they were again ordered to withdraw. Meanwhile, the Anzac Corps decided to make its last stand 100 miles (160 km) south at Thermopylae.

In the end, the Māori remained in position until 17 April. Throughout the previous two days the battalion worked hard to repel repeated attempts by elements of the German 2nd Infantry Regiment to infiltrate their lines before they finally received the order to fall back. With isolated platoons still in contact with the Germans and amidst high winds and a heavy downpour of rain, the New Zealanders had difficulty disengaging. Withdrawing over difficult terrain towards the pass, the manoeuvre continued into the night as the Germans continued to harass their rearguard units. The move was carried out with considerable urgency because the intention was to blow a bridge up just after the battalion had withdrawn across it in order to delay the German advance. In the end, the battalion only just made it, for the engineers tasked with carrying out the demolition had received the order to complete their task and were about to detonate when the battalion arrived shortly after 3:00 am.

After meeting motor transport, the battalion moved back to Ay Dhimitrios, which they began to prepare to defend in order to help seal off the exit of the Olympus pass. The withdrawal continued, though, and on 19 April the Māori Battalion was called upon to conduct a delaying action as the rest of the 5th Infantry Brigade pulled back through Larisa towards Lamia, 80 miles (130 km) south. Along roads packed with vehicles and civilian traffic they withdrew amidst considerable confusion. Upon arrival at Thermopylae the battalion had had just enough time to dig in before receiving the order that they were to move their position in order to make way for the 6th Infantry Brigade. They completed this move by 21 April, taking up the same positions that Leonidas and his army had defended against Xerxes in 480 BC, according to legend. Here they took up position in a marsh and as they made preparations for its defence, on 22 April, in Athens, the decision was made that the units of the British Commonwealth forces would be withdrawn from the country.

Over the course of the next two days, the battalion withdrew towards Athens, where they arrived in the early morning on 24 April. They continued on to the beach at Porto Rafti, destroying their vehicles and other equipment as they went. In the confusion of orders and counter orders, the battalion's carrier and mortar platoons had gotten separated from the rest of the unit. By 9:00 pm on 24 April when the final move to the beach commenced they still had not arrived. The operation went according to plan, however, and by 3:00 am on 25 April the transports embarked. Of the various groups that had become detached from the battalion, some were able to make their own way to the embarkation beaches, but a number of them were ultimately captured. The battalion's casualties in Greece were 10 killed or died of wounds, six wounded, 83 captured, 11 wounded and captured.

=== Crete ===
After being evacuated from Greece, the Māori Battalion embarked upon the landing ship, infantry HMS Glengyle and was taken to Crete where they formed part of the island's hastily formed garrison. The 5th Infantry Brigade was allocated to the area surrounding the airfield and the battalion was positioned on the north coast at Platanias, on the brigade's right flank. On 20 May 1941, the Germans launched the opening stages of their campaign with large-scale glider and parachute drops of troops from Maleme to Canea. The landings were focused around the airfield and no troops landed in the area being held by the Māori, nevertheless, a small force of glider troops were found to be occupying a house on the beach about 0.5 miles (0.80 km) from them. A platoon was dispatched to attack them and after a brief fire-fight in which two New Zealanders were wounded and eight Germans were killed, the 10 remaining men in the house surrendered.

German assault on Crete

The main German attack was focused upon the 22nd Battalion which was defending the airfield. Hard pressed, late in the day, the 22nd requested reinforcements and the 5th Infantry Brigade commander, Brigadier J. Hargest, sent one company from the 23rd and one from the 28th. The task was given to 'B' Company and, as the company commander only knew the direct route, they had a night approach march of over 8 miles (13 km) to cover. During the march, they came in contact with a platoon-sized force of Germans which briefly held up the company before reinforcements could arrive. The German force surrendered, but in doing so one of their number threw a grenade at the New Zealanders, wounding two men. In response the Māori fixed bayonets and carried out the first bayonet charge by a New Zealand force during the war, killing 24. A short while later they killed another eight in a separate engagement. Continuing on towards the 22nd Battalion, they bumped into a number of small pockets of Germans before eventually linking up with the 22nd Battalion's headquarters where they were told to return to their own lines as the decision had been made to withdraw from the airfield. Eleven hours later the company reported back to the 28th Battalion's lines.

Over the course of the next ten days the battalion was involved in a series of engagements as they fought to defend the island, with the most notable probably being the bayonet charge that they undertook with the Australian 2/7th Battalion at 42nd Street on 27 May in which 280 Germans were killed, with the Māori accounting for 100. However, it soon became clear that the garrison on Crete would need to be evacuated and on 28 May the bulk of Creforce began to disengage the Germans and begin the retreat towards Sfakia. The 5th Infantry Brigade took turns with two Australian battalions and the commandos of Layforce to carry out a rearguard action to guard the pass through which the troops had to traverse in order to escape.

On 30 May the final order was received, although due to shipping losses, it was not possible to evacuate everyone. In order to maintain fairness, each battalion was allotted a certain number of men who would have to remain and defend the embarkation beaches to allow the others to get away. The 28th Battalion was allocated 230 men to embark, while six officers and 144 men would have to stay behind. A large number of men volunteered to remain, and at midnight the remainder headed down to the beach and were taken off on a landing ship two hours later. The battalion suffered 243 casualties during the brief defence of the island, including 74 men killed and 102 men wounded. A further 67 were captured, of which 46 were wounded. For his leadership of the battalion during the fighting on Crete, Dittmer received the Distinguished Service Order.

=== North Africa ===
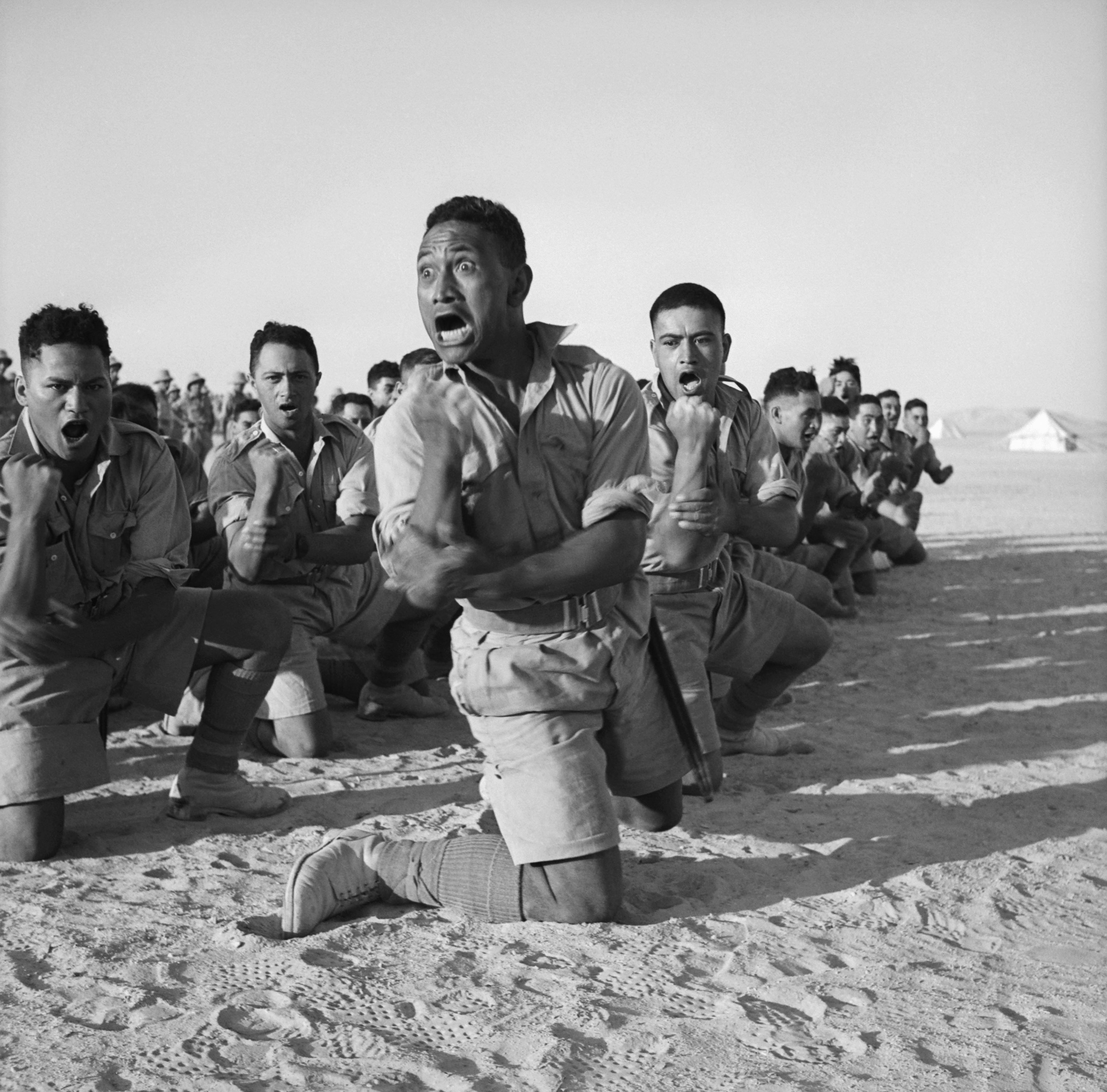
Members of the 28th Battalion performing a haka, Egypt (July 1941). From left: John Manuel from Rangitukia, killed six months later; Maaka White of Wharekahika, killed five months later; Te Kooti Reihana of Rangitukia, later wounded; and Rangi Henderson from Te Araroa, killed two years later.

After their escape from Crete, the 28th (Māori) Battalion was evacuated to Egypt where they were re-issued with summer uniforms and began to receive reinforcements. In June they carried out a ceremonial parade for King George VI and the Queen, and the commander of the 2nd New Zealand Division, Lieutenant General Bernard Freyberg. Throughout July, the battalion undertook desert familiarisation training and sports parades before moving to Kabrit where they concentrated with the rest of the 5th Infantry Brigade for a three-week combined operations exercise. Later, in August, they moved to a position 20 miles (32 km) west of El Alamein, known as the "Kaponga Box" where throughout September and into October they undertook the unfamiliar task of road construction. In October, the brigade received orders to link up with the rest of the division in preparation for their commitment to the battle along the frontier.

On 11 November 1941, the 5th Infantry Brigade concentrated near Mersa Matruh. Three days later the division had assembled and began the advance into Libya. Their first task was to capture the seaside town of Sollum, which was taken on 23 November from its Italian garrison with only a few casualties. Follow-up artillery inflicted 18 killed and 33 wounded however, including the commanding officer, Lieutenant Colonel George Dittmer, and two company commanders. Two hundred and forty-seven Italian prisoners were taken. Following this, the 5th Infantry Brigade was placed under the command of the 4th Indian Division and the 28th Battalion took up positions near Bardia.

Three days later the battalion attacked a column of tanks and motorised infantry before ambushing a column at Menastir on 3 December. Later, notable actions were undertaken at Gazala and at Sidi Magreb where over 1,000 Italians prisoners were captured. Following this, the battalion was deployed to Syria before returning to Egypt in June 1942. Now officially under the command of a Māori for the first time—Lieutenant Colonel Eruera Love having taken over from Dyer in May—the Māori took part in the 2nd New Zealand Division's breakout from Minqar Qaim, undertaking a successful bayonet charge. At this time, the battalion's skills with the bayonet earned them a reputation as "scalp hunters" among German commanders, including Rommel.

In September and October the battalion took part in important actions as part of the offensive in the Munassib Depression and at Miteiriya Ridge during the Second Battle of El Alamein. On 2 November the battalion supported the final breakthrough by Allied forces that decided the outcome of the battle. Casualties were high during this time and three of its commanding officers were either killed or wounded between July and November 1942. Nevertheless, the battalion remained in the fighting and in March 1943, at Medenine it undertook a defensive role before switching to the offensive at Point 209 in the Tebaga Gap, where it was responsible for almost completely destroying a German Panzergrenadier battalion. It was during this action that Second Lieutenant Moana-Nui-a-Kiwa Ngarimu performed the deeds that led to him being posthumously decorated with the Victoria Cross. The battalion's commanding officer, Lieutenant Colonel Charles Bennett, also received the Distinguished Service Order for his leadership during the attack.

Two weeks later, on the night 19/20 April 1943, the battalion took part in the 5th Infantry Brigade's attack on the Tunisian village of Takrouna. The village was situated atop a steep slope, and the attack stalled due to heavy concentrations of indirect fire and landmines, which wounded a number of men, including the commanding officer. Nevertheless, two sections under the command of Sergeant Haane te Rauawa Manahi, managed to scale the western side of the escarpment and gain a foothold on the pinnacle in the early dawn. Following heavy shellfire and hand-to-hand combat with the Italian defenders, the Māori were forced off the pinnacle twice; each time, though, Manahi led his small force in a counterattack. In the afternoon, Manahi and two other men captured a number of machine gun and mortar positions, encircling the Italians and forcing them to surrender. For these actions, Manahi was also recommended for a Victoria Cross, but the nomination was not approved and he received a Distinguished Conduct Medal instead.

=== Italy ===
The battalion returned to Egypt with the 5th Infantry Brigade in late-May and underwent a period of refit and retraining, during which the bulk of the original unit was given three months leave and returned to New Zealand. Following the evacuation to hospital of Lieutenant Colonel Kingi Keiha, there were no suitable senior Māori officers available and he was replaced as commanding officer by Lieutenant Colonel Monty Fairbrother on 11 September. Having taken no part in the Allied invasion of Sicily in July – August, the 2nd New Zealand Division was committed to battle again in late 1943 as part of Eighth Army during the Italian Campaign. The Māori Battalion subsequently arrived in Italy on 22 October, landing at Taranto. 5th Infantry Brigade undertook a period of training in close-country tactics, remaining in camp at Taranto until 18 November when it was ordered to move north 250 miles (400 km) to join the Eighth Army.

The 2nd New Zealand Division had moved into the front line in November in order to relieve the 8th Indian Division and would take part in the advance across the Sangro planned for the end of the month. The brigade subsequently occupied positions around Atessa, with the Māori Battalion in brigade reserve, occupying a series of low hills which formed the Sangro river valley. The Eighth Army's forward units had reached the Sangro in early November and General Harold Alexander—commander of the 15th Army Group—had planned for Lieutenant General Bernard Montgomery to strike across the river on its coastal plain on 20 November with V Corps. Montgomery shifted the 8th Indian Division to the right in secret to narrow the V Corps front and concentrate its power, bringing the newly arrived 2nd New Zealand Division into the gap. Heavy rain flooded the river, forcing the postponement of the offensive and giving the Germans time to move in reinforcements. In the early hours of 28 November the Eighth Army attack began, supported by heavy artillery concentrations. The New Zealanders advanced steadily, capturing the bulk of their objectives. The Māori Battalion, still in brigade reserve, stood to during the attack but was not required.

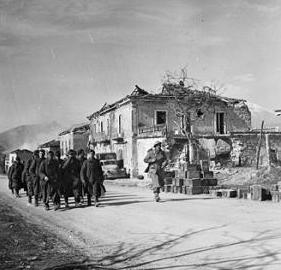
Troops from the Maori battalion escort German prisoners of war near Cassino, February 1944

During December the 2nd New Zealand Division took part in the Moro River Campaign. By this time the attacking battalions had exploited forward towards the Winter Line and the Māori Battalion moved forward by truck on 1 December, crossing the Sangro. Heavy congestion on the road delayed the battalion's movements, and although scheduled to assault towards Elici, they arrived to find the 23rd Battalion and the Division Cavalry had already completed the task. The Māori were again ordered into reserve, occupying positions 1 mile (1.6 km) east of Castelfrentano. Meanwhile, on 3 December, the 6th Infantry Brigade assaulted Orsogna, and was involved in heavy fighting there, first capturing and then losing it following a counter-attack by German armour. A subsequent attack against Orsogna was planned by the New Zealanders utilising both the 5th and 6th Infantry Brigades. The attack was scheduled for 7 December, with both brigades to advance on a one battalion front. The Māori Battalion would lead the assault in the 5th Infantry Brigade section, up the Pascuccio spur to cut the Orsogna–Ortona road east of the 6th Infantry Brigade's objective. Fairbrother planned to assault with two companies forward, one in depth and one in reserve, with support from armour and anti-tank guns. This could not be provided though, as difficult terrain prevented tracked vehicles from moving across the Moro and up on to Pascuccio.

The attack on Orsogna began at 3:30 pm, following a half-hour artillery bombardment, and marked the battalion's first battle on Italian soil. Although initially some progress was made, the Germans managed to hold Orsogna throughout December amidst intense hand-to-hand fighting. Finally, the Māori were withdrawn from the line on the night of 15/16 January 1944 when they were relieved by an Indian unit. Over the course of the battle, they had lost 11 men killed and 222 wounded.

The New Zealanders were subsequently transferred to the Fifth Army for its advance up the west coast of Italy towards Rome. Leaving behind the bitter cold on the other side of the peninsula, the battalion undertook a period of training and reorganisation near Sant' Angelo d'Alife. At this time Fairbrother was replaced by another pākehā officer, Major Russell Young, who was promoted to lieutenant colonel and subsequently led the battalion until July 1944.

As part of the Fifth Army's advance up the Liri valley, the Māori Battalion's next major engagement came in early 1944 when they took part in the fighting around Monte Cassino. The position at Cassino was dominated by an historic Benedictine monastery. Throughout January the Allies continued their advance, but as they were checked by the German positions at Cassino the advance stalled. On the night of 17/18 February 1944, as part of an attempt to establish a bridgehead into the German lines, the Māori were tasked with attacking the railway station in Cassino. They met very stiff resistance, and although they managed to reach the railway station they were unable to wrest control of it from its defenders. Lacking armoured support, which had failed to arrive, they fought through the morning and into the afternoon, but when their position was assaulted by two German tanks they were forced to withdraw. The two assaulting companies, 'A' and 'B', suffered over 60 per cent casualties, losing 128 men killed or wounded. In March they were again involved in fighting around Cassino, however, it was not until May that the position was eventually captured, by which time the New Zealanders had been withdrawn from the line, and transferred back to the Eighth Army.

Due to these losses, the battalion did not return to the front until July 1944. It subsequently took part in the Allied advance towards Florence and is believed to have been first to reach the city on 4 August. During this time Major Arapeta Awatere led the battalion as its acting commanding officer after Young was hospitalised with jaundice, although he returned in late August and subsequently led them through the fighting around Rimini in September. In November, Awatere took over command substantively, and in December the battalion launched an attack around Faenza, for which its commanding officer later received a Distinguished Service Order. The winter snow set in after this and, as Allied attentions were temporarily focused elsewhere, offensive action died down. Thus, throughout January, February and into March the battalion undertook defensive duties, before being withdrawn from the line in mid-March.

In April 1945 the battalion returned to the front line to take part in the final stages of the war. On 1 April the battalion entered the line near Granarolo along with the rest of the 5th Infantry Brigade and for the next month they were involved in five main battles along the Senio, Santerno, Sillaro, Gaiana and Idice rivers as the Allies pursued the Germans back towards Trieste. It was in Trieste that the Māori Battalion's war came to an end. Their involvement in the final stages of the fighting in Italy had cost them 25 killed and 117 wounded, while losses for the entire Italian campaign were 230 men killed, and 887 wounded.

=== Disbandment ===
On 2 May 1945 news was received that all German forces west of the Isonzo River had surrendered. While this did not officially end the fighting in Italy, it was all but over. Five days later, on the night of 7 May, the battalion received the news that Germany had surrendered unconditionally to the Allies, and that the war in Europe was over. Nevertheless, tensions remained high and concerns about the intentions of Yugoslavia regarding the disputed province of Istria meant that the 28th (Māori) Battalion remained on high alert. This continued until early June when an agreement was reached and Yugoslavia withdrew its troops east of the Isonzo River.

Following this the routine of the battalion became more settled and time was found for the men of each company to spend a fortnight at a hotel on the Lignano beach. Afterwards, preparations began for the battalion's return to New Zealand. The war with Japan continued however, and at the time it was believed that the Māori would take part in further operations in the Pacific. New Zealand policy at the time was that long serving men were to be repatriated and their places taken by men with less time in service. In this regard, commencing in late May, drafts of men departed in the order of their arrival at the battalion. This included the commanding officer, Lieutenant Colonel Arapeta Awatere, who was replaced by Lieutenant Colonel James Hēnare.

Throughout July the battalion undertook garrison duties in Trieste before the 2nd New Zealand Division was withdrawn to Lake Trasimene. On 15 August 1945 news was received of Japan's unconditional surrender, ending plans for the battalion to take part in further combat in the Pacific. In September it was decided that as part of the departure of New Zealand troops from the theatre, memorial services would be held at the locations of the division's major battles. As a part of this programme services were held at Cassino and Sangro and on Crete, while smaller parties were sent to Coriano Ridge, Faenza, Forli, Padua, Monfalcone and Udine.

The last batch of long service men had departed shortly after the battalion's arrival at Lake Trasimene, and so after this it was decided that the battalion would return to New Zealand as a formed unit. As such their return was to be delayed and so they found winter quarters in Florence. At this time it was decided that men from the battalion would be included within the New Zealand contribution to the occupation of Japan. In this vein, a 270-strong contingent from the battalion was sent to Japan under the designation of 'D' Squadron, 2nd Divisional Cavalry Battalion, under the command of Major J.S Baker. Finally, on 6 December the battalion entrained at Florence and embarked on the troopship Dominion Monarch at Taranto on Boxing Day. Passing through the Suez Canal, they sailed via Fremantle, arriving in Wellington on 23 January 1946, where they were met by the acting Prime Minister, Walter Nash, at Aotea Quay for an official Māori welcome home ceremony. Afterwards the men were sent back to their homes and the battalion was disbanded.

Throughout the course of the war, 3,600 men served in the battalion. Of these, 649 were killed or died of wounds while another 1,712 were wounded. Another 29 died as a result of service following discharge, while two were killed by accident during training in New Zealand. The Māori Battalion's service against the Germans in North Africa earned them a distinguished reputation. Such was the respect that Allied commanders had for the Māori Battalion that they were frequently used as a spearhead unit. Bernard Freyberg, the General Officer Commanding of the 2NZEF, commented, "No infantry had a more distinguished record, or saw more fighting, or, alas, had such heavy casualties, as the Maori Battalion." (Note: A full roll of honour can be found in Cody.) The battalion's reputation was also acknowledged by their opponents. Some sources state that the Afrika Korps commander Erwin Rommel remarked "Give me the Maori Battalion and I will conquer the world". However, the attribution of this remark has been called in to question, as Rommel never mentioned the battalion in his memoirs. Other sources attribute this comment to Rommel's former chief of staff, General Siegfried Westphal, who met with the former Māori Battalion chaplain, Reverend Canon Wiremu T. Huata, during a 1972 Afrika Korps reunion dinner in Mainz, Germany.

The last officer of the battalion, Alfred "Bunty" Preece, died in 2018; he had held the rank of lieutenant. The last known surviving member of the battalion, Sir Bom Gillies, died on 7 November 2024.

== Decorations ==
In total, the Māori Battalion received more individual bravery decorations than any other New Zealand battalion. One member of the battalion, Second Lieutenant Moana-Nui-a-Kiwa Ngarimu, was awarded the Victoria Cross during the war, while another member, Sergeant Haane Manahi, was also recommended for the award. During the fighting around Takrouna in 1943, Manahi led a section of men up a sheer limestone escarpment to capture a number of Italian positions; the following day he set out to capture Italian outposts. Four generals, including Harold Alexander, Bernard Freyberg, Howard Kippenberger and Bernard Law Montgomery had recommended that Manahi receive the Victoria Cross but this recommendation was downgraded in London to the Distinguished Conduct Medal.

In 2000, iwi Te Arawa lodged a claim with the Waitangi Tribunal for Haane Manahi to have his award of the Distinguished Conduct Medal upgraded to a Victoria Cross. In December 2005 the Waitangi Tribunal released their findings supporting the claim, but in October 2006 the New Zealand Minister of Defence announced that the award could not be made as King George VI had ruled in 1949 that no further awards from the Second World War ought to be made. Instead, it was decided that Manahi would be recognised by the presentation of an altar cloth, a personal letter from Queen Elizabeth II acknowledging his gallantry and a sword. The award was presented to Manahi's son by The Duke of York on 17 March 2007 at a ceremony in Rotorua.

Other awards to members of the 28th (Māori) Battalion included: seven Distinguished Service Orders; (Note: Lt-Col A. Awatere, MC; Lt-Col F. Baker; Lt-Col C.M. Bennett; Lt-Col G. Dittmer, MBE, MC; Lt-Col R.R.T. Young; Maj J.C. Henare; and Lt M. Wikiriwhi.) one Member of the Order of the British Empire; (Note: Mr C.B. Bennet (attached from YMCA).) 21 Military Crosses and three bars; (Note: Maj W.S.L. Mcrae; Maj H.W. Northcroft; Maj W. Reedy; Capt A. Awatere; Capt C.N. D'Arcy (attached from NZMC); Capt I.G. Harris; Capt K.A. Keiha; Capt H.C.A. Lambert; Capt J. Matehaere; Capt P.F.Te H. Ornberg; Capt R. Royal; Capt Te M.R. Tomoana; Capt M. Wikiriwhi, DSO; Lt W. Porter; Lt Te R.W. Tibble; Lt J.P. Tikao-Barrett; 2 Lt J.S. Baker; 2 Lt B.G. Christy; 2 Lt A. Huata; 2 Lt P.O. Lambly and Rev W.Te T. Huata (Chaplain, attached). Bar to the MC: Capt J.S. Baker, MC; Capt W. Porter, MC; and Capt R. Royal, MC.) and 13 Distinguished Conduct Medals; (Note: WO I M.T. Mcrae; WO I A.C. Wood; Sgt R. Davis; Sgt J.W. Mataira; L-Sgt H. Manahi; Cpl H.K. Barrett; Cpl P. Rakena; Cpl W. Teneti; Cpl N. Tuakti; Pte T. Heka; Pte L. Helmbright; Pte P. Maangi; Pte C. Shelford.) 51 Military Medals; (Note: WO II K. Harawira; WO II W. Pahau; S-Sgt K. Rangitauira; Sgt J. August; Sgt R. Cullen; Sgt G. Katene; Sgt R. C. H. Kirkwood (EME, attached); Sgt M. Kupa; Sgt H. Mackey; Sgt T. Matenga; Sgt T. Pitama; Sgt W. Te Waiti; Sgt J. I. Walker; Sgt P. Walters; Sgt I. Weepu; L-Sgt T. Trainor; Cpl N. B. Cook; Cpl J. Heke; Cpl J. Pirihi; Cpl J. Tainui; Cpl T. Tamou; Cpl P. R. Te Rito; Cpl J. Tupene; Cpl R. Waaka; L-Cpl D. Alex; L-Cpl B. Hardiman; L-Cpl G. D. King; L-Cpl H. Ruha; Pte C. T. Apihai; Pte R. H. Bidois; Pte R. Bluett; Pte A. N. Carroll; Pte T. E. Duncan; Pte K. Edward; Pte H. Grant; Pte R. Hemi; Pte R. Hoani; Pte F. Jones; Pte J. Kira; Pte R. McLean; Pte G. Matthews; Pte T. T. Nathan; Pte J. M. Ngapo; Pte G. Nia-Nia; Pte W. Panoho; Pte M. R. Potae; Pte K. Rangi; Pte G. Sutherland; Pte F. Te Namu; Pte T. H. Tuhi and Pte P. Wilson.) one British Empire Medal (Note: Sgt A. B. Goodwillie.) and one US Silver Star. (Note: Pte J. Taua.)

== Battle honours ==
The following is a list of battle honours received by the 28th (Māori) Battalion: (Note: Awarded in 1957.)

- Second World War: Olympus Pass, Crete, El Alamein, Tebega Gap, Takrouna, North Africa 1942–43, Orsogna, Cassino 1, The Senio, Italy 1943–45, Mount Olympus, Greece 1941, Maleme, Canea, 42nd Street, Withdrawal to Sphakia, Middle East 1941–44, Tobruk 1941, Sidi Azeiz, Zemla, Alem Hamza, Mersa Matruh, Minqar Qaim, Defence of Alamein Line, El Mreir, Alam el Halfa, Nofilia, Medinine, El Hamma, Enfidaville, Djebibina, The Sangro, Castel Frentano, Monastery Hill, Advance to Florence, San Michele, Paula Line, Celle, Saint Angelo in Salute, Santerno Crossing, Bologna and Idice Bridgehead.

== Commanding officers ==
The following is a list of the 28th (Māori) Battalion's commanding officers:

- Lieutenant Colonel G. Dittmer (29 January 1940 – 7 February 1942); (Note: After Dittmer was wounded on 23 November 1941 Captain Love commanded the battalion in an acting capacity until 7 December 1941 when Dyer took command, although Dyer was not officially given that appointment until 7 February 1942.)
- Lieutenant Colonel H. Dyer (7 February 1942 – 13 May 1942);
- Lieutenant Colonel E. W. R. Love (13 May 1942 – 12 July 1942);
- Lieutenant Colonel F. Baker (13 July 1942 – 2 November 1942);
- Lieutenant Colonel C. M. Bennett (2 November 1942 – 20 April 1943);
- Lieutenant Colonel K. A. Keiha (22 April 1943 – 11 September 1943);
- Lieutenant Colonel M. C. Fairbrother (11 September 1943 – 27 December 1943);
- Lieutenant Colonel R. R. T. Young (27 December 1943 – 27 July 1944);
- Lieutenant Colonel A. Awatere (27 July 1944 – 29 August 1944);
- Lieutenant Colonel R. R. T. Young (29 August 1944 – 18 November 1944);
- Lieutenant Colonel A. Awatere (18 November 1944 – 21 June 1945);
- Lieutenant Colonel J. C. Hēnare (21 June 1945 – 23 January 1946).

== See also ==
- Military history of New Zealand during World War II
- 2nd Māori Battalion

== Notes ==
Footnotes

Citations
