= Takrouna =

Village in Tunisia

Coordinates: 36°09′00″N 10°19′39″E

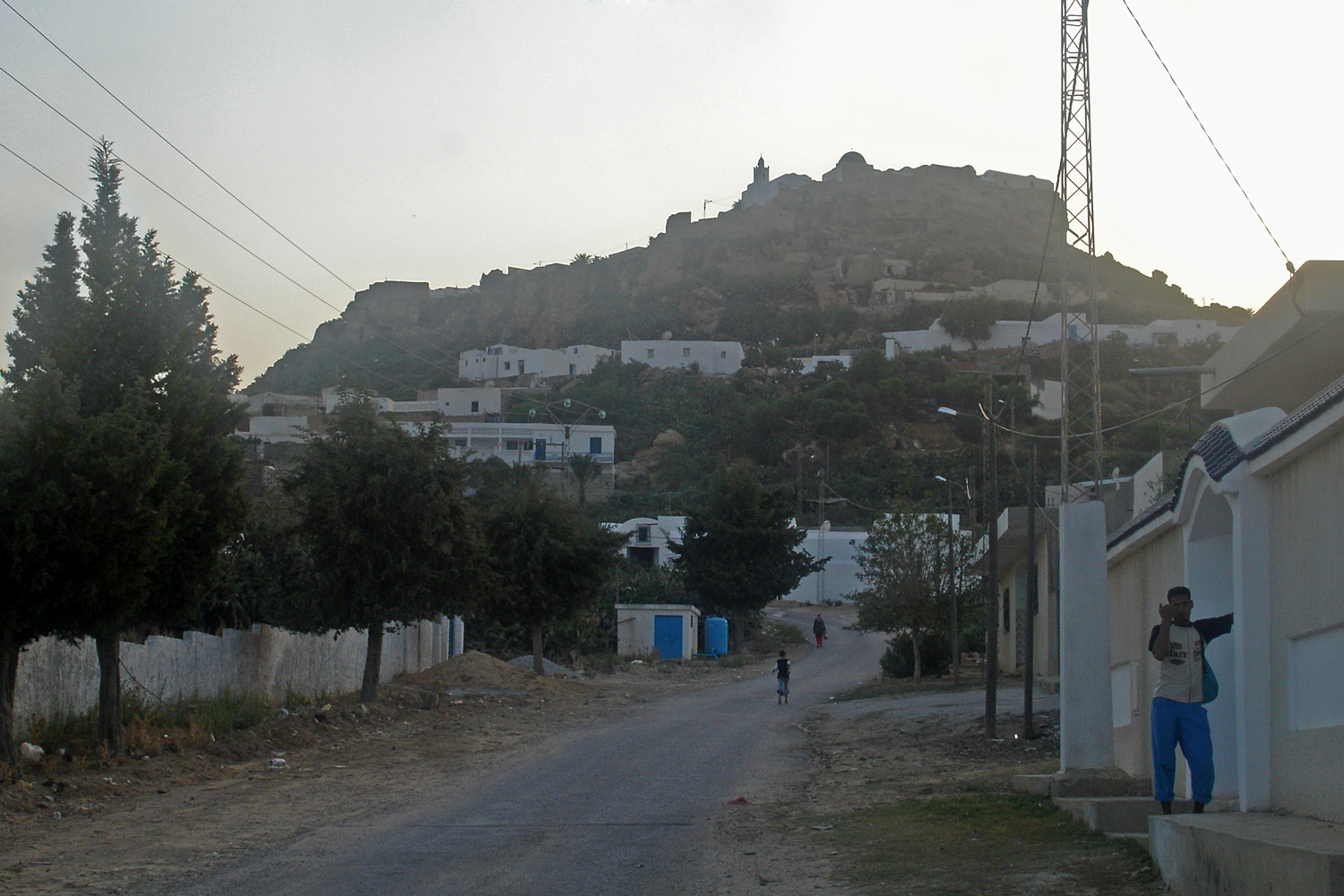
Takrouna

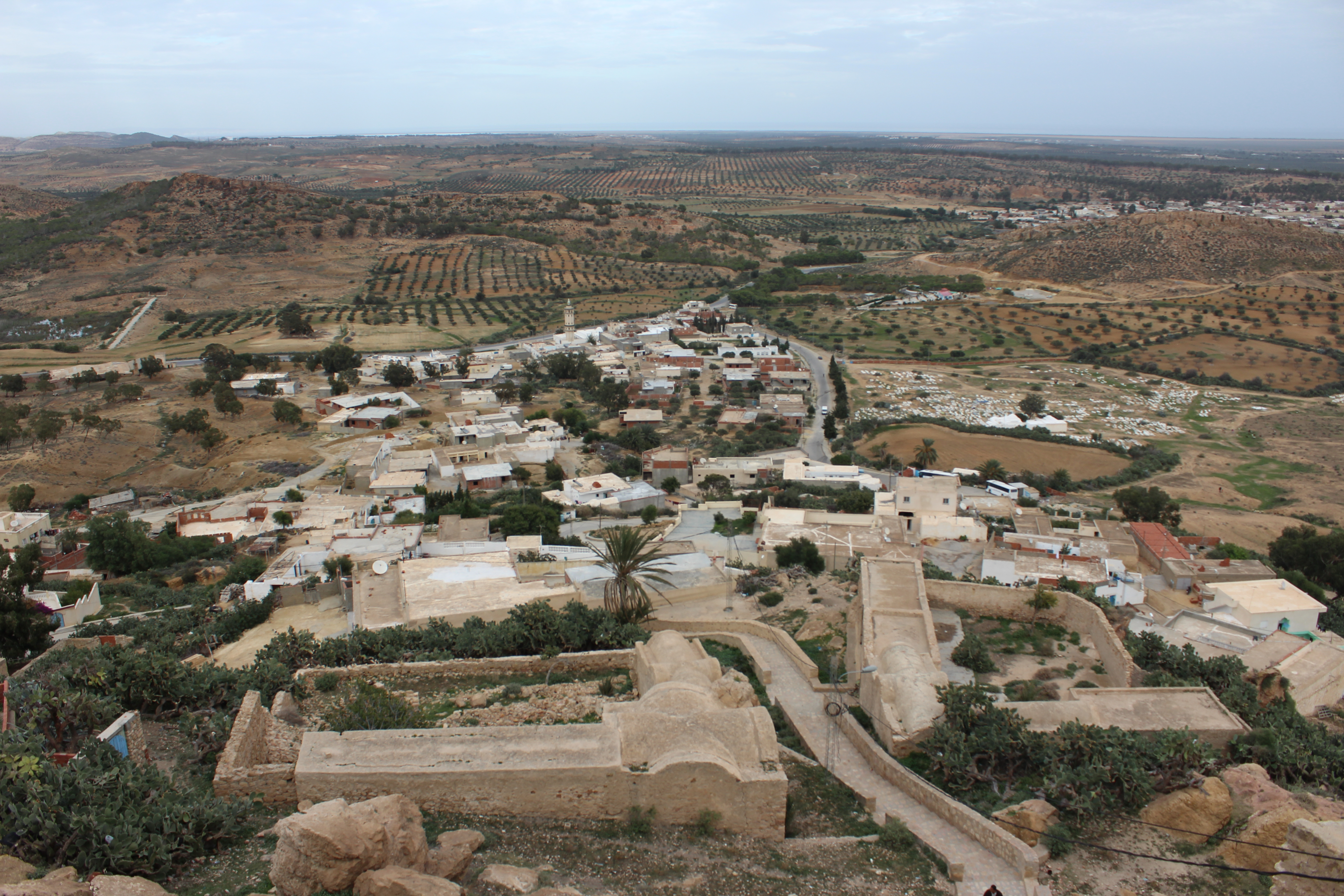
Takrouna 3.

Takrouna (Berber: ⵜⴰⴽⵔⵓⵏⴰ; Arabic: تكرونة) also spelled as Ta Kurunna, is a small village in the Sahel region of Tunisia. It stands on a hill at approximately 200 metres above sea level, overlooking the Gulf of Hammamet, Hergla and Sousse to the east, Djebel Zaghouan to the north, and the Kairouan plain to the south.

== History ==
The name Takrouna is believed to have originated from a tribe that immigrated to Andalusia in the 8th century. Following the expulsion of the Moors, in 1609 the descendants of these immigrants settled on the hill that the village now occupies.

Takrouna was the site of the last major action by New Zealand troops in North Africa during World War II, before the surrender of Italy and Germany. Following the Battle of the Mareth Line (16-31 March 1943), Axis forces were driven back into Tunisia. On 19 April New Zealand forces prepared for an assault on Takrouna, then held by the Italian 66th regiment, elements of Paratroopers Division "Folgore", elements of Italian Granatieri and one German company. At dawn on 20 April, Lance-sergeant Haane Te Rauawa Manahi led a platoon on an attack up the hill, and successfully overran the Italian defenses. Manahi then left to locate reinforcements, returning with a section of C Company and another platoon, successfully resisting an Axis counterattack. Manahi and his section descended from the hill, but despite the reinforcements the New Zealand forces lost the hill to a second Axis counterattack on 21 April. Manahi returned in the afternoon and, with artillery support, retook first the ledge and then the village on the summit, taking 300 prisoners. Over 550 New Zealanders were killed or wounded in the battle.

== Demographics ==
Six families of Berber origin live in the village with one family of Andalusian descent.

As of October 2024, only two families of Berber origin remain in the village.
