= Cinema of New Zealand =

- No. of screens: 411 (2010)

Produced feature films (2024)
- Fictional: 328
- Animated: 2
- Documentary: 117

Number of admissions (2010)
- Total: 15,300,000
  - Per capita: 3.6 (2010)

Gross box office (2012)
- Total: $145 million
- National films: $3.19 million (2.20%)

The cinema of New Zealand refers to films made by New Zealand–based production companies in New Zealand or films made about New Zealand by filmmakers from other countries. New Zealand produces many films that are co-financed by overseas companies.

The history of cinema in New Zealand is almost as long as the medium itself. The first public screening of a motion picture took place in 1896. A documentary made in 1900 is the oldest surviving New Zealand film, while the first feature film made in New Zealand premiered in 1914. A small-scale industry developed between the 1920s and the 1960s, but it was not until the 1970s that locally made films began to attract significant audiences.

From the 1990s onward, New Zealand-made films have increasingly achieved international success, including both those with local funding and themes, and those with additional foreign cooperation. Notable film directors who emerged in New Zealand cinema in the 1990s include Jane Campion, Peter Jackson and Lee Tamahori. Other New Zealand directors who found success in Hollywood during the same time include Martin Campbell, Vincent Ward and Andrew Niccol. Notable New Zealand actors who found success both in New Zealand and Hollywood cinema include Sam Neill, Cliff Curtis, Melanie Lynskey and Anna Paquin.

For a list of the 328 feature films and 117 documentaries made in New Zealand, see List of New Zealand films.

== Defining New Zealand film ==
In October 1978, the New Zealand Film Commission was formalised by Parliament under the Third National Government.

Under Section 17 of the New Zealand Film Commission Act 1978, the functions of the commission are to:

- Encourage and assist in the making, promotion, distribution and exhibition of films
- Encourage and promote cohesion with NZ film industry
- Encourage and promote maintenance of films in archives

With this Act, the New Zealand film industry became more stabilised. Section 18 of the Act, entitled "Content of Films", defines what makes "a New Zealand film". To qualify, a film must have "significant New Zealand content", judged by taking into account the following:

- The subject of the film (settings, characters, source material, etc.)
- The locations at which the film was made
- The nationalities or places of residence of:
  - the authors, scriptwriters, composers, producers, directors, actors, technicians, editors, etc.
  - the owners of any company, partnership, or joint venture involved in making the film
  - the copyright holders
- The sources from which the money is derived
- The ownership and whereabouts of the equipment and technical facilities

These defining aspects have in recent years caused debate on whether films like The Frighteners and The Lord of the Rings qualify as New Zealand films. The impact of the New Zealand Film Commission upon the industry was significant in getting films made, coming to a definition of "New Zealand Film", and helped to establish a screen industry in New Zealand.

Most New Zealand films are made by independent filmmakers, often on a low budget and with sponsorship from public funding sources. Few New Zealand-made films have been specifically commissioned for the international market by international film distributors.

Recently, international film companies have become more aware of the skills of New Zealand filmmakers, and have increasingly used the country as a shooting location and also somewhere to finish production of their feature films.

Private funding for New Zealand films has often been in short supply, although for a period in the early 1980s, tax breaks resulted in a short term production boom. Some New Zealand directors and actors have been ignored in large part by their own country, despite success overseas, and often had to work in the US, Australia, and the UK as a result.

== History ==
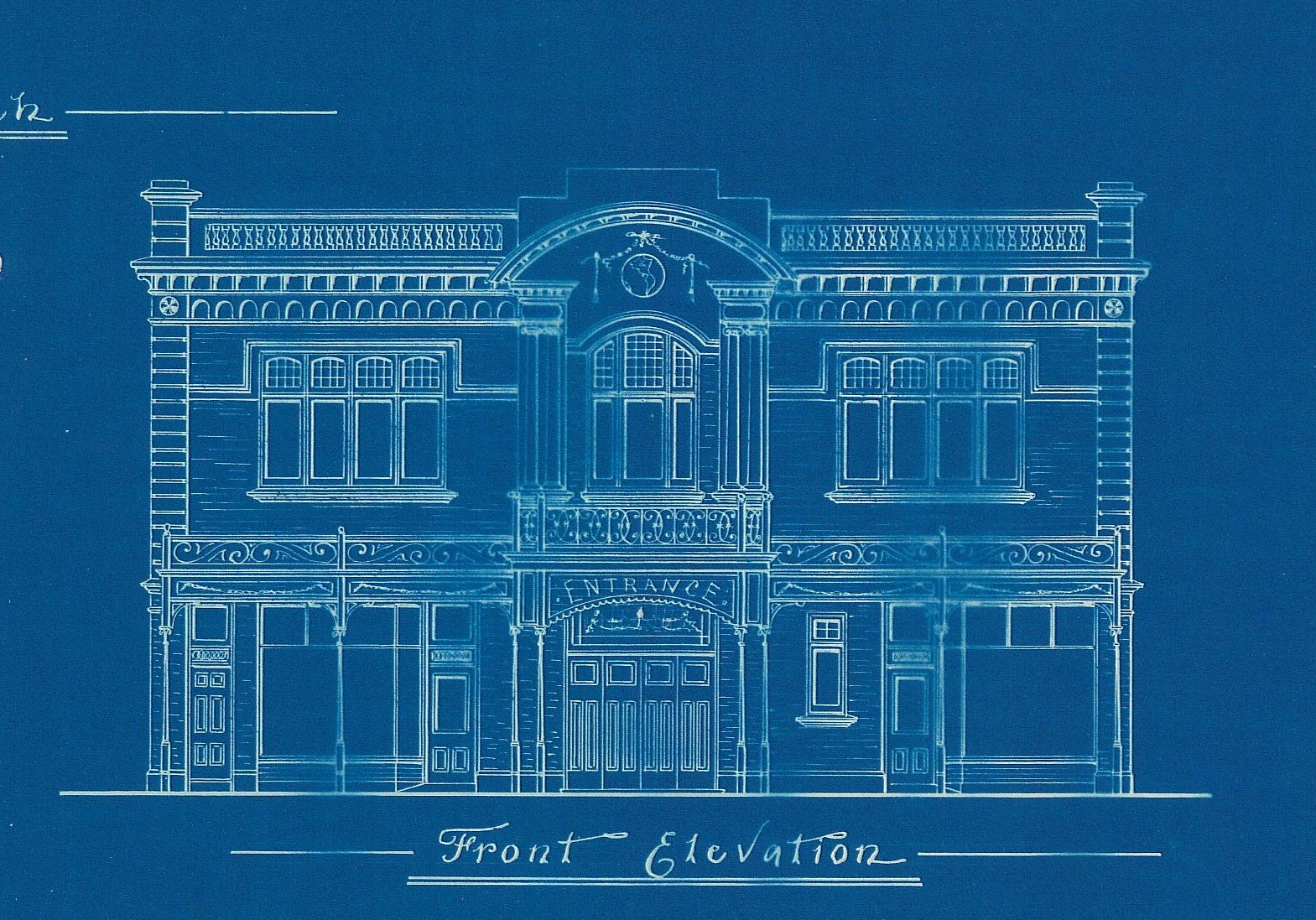
Mayfair Theatre permit plan, 1914. Dunedin City Council Archives.

=== Early film: 1890s–1920s ===
The first public screening of a motion picture in New Zealand took place on 13 October 1896 at the Opera House in Auckland. The screening—which was in fact a demonstration of Thomas Edison's kinetograph—was part of a show presented by Charles Godfrey's Vaudeville Company. The first screening of a colour film—one using a colour process, not just a colourised black-and-white film—was on 24 December 1911 in Auckland. The film was shown simultaneously at the Globe Picture Theatre in Queen Street and the Kings Theatre on Upper Pitt Street (now the Mercury Theatre).

The first filmmaker in New Zealand was Alfred Henry Whitehouse, who made ten films between 1898 and mid-1900. The oldest surviving New Zealand film is Whitehouse's The Departure of the Second Contingent for the Boer War (1900).

The first feature film made in New Zealand is arguably Hinemoa. It premiered on 17 August 1914 at the Lyric Theatre, Auckland.

Up until February 6 2025, New Zealand's oldest surviving cinema was in Roxburgh in Central Otago, which opened in the town's Athenæum Hall on 11 December 1897. The editors of the local newspaper, the Mount Benger Mail, wrote in the issue of 10 December: "We would draw the attention of the public to the Salon Cinématographe entertainment in the Athenæum Hall to-morrow evening. This is an opportunity which should not be missed of witnessing life scenes."

Purpose-built cinemas were built from 1910 onwards, with the first being Wellington's The Kings, built in 1910. Another example is the Mayfair Theatre in Dunedin, built in 1913. The oldest surviving purpose-built cinema in New Zealand — and in the Southern Hemisphere — is the Victoria Theatre in Devonport, Auckland, built in 1912.

=== The classical era: 1920s–1960s ===
New Zealand's was a small-scale film industry between the 1920s and 1960s. In the 1920s and 1930s, Rudall Hayward made a number of feature films on New Zealand themes. Rewi's Last Stand was probably his best, but little of this 1925 film survives. The film was remade with sound in 1940. Independent filmmaker John O'Shea was active from 1940 to 1970 making New Zealand cinema; his company Pacific Films produced numerous short films as well as the three New Zealand feature films made in that period: Broken Barrier (1952) with Roger Mirams; Runaway (1964); and Don't Let It Get You (1966).

However, most New Zealand-made films of the period were documentaries. The National Film Unit was a government-funded producer of short films, documentaries, and publicity material. This is New Zealand, a short film made for the World Expo in 1970, was extremely popular there and subsequently screened in New Zealand cinemas, garnering considerable acclaim. It used three separate projectors to create a wide-screen image. The film was restored in 2006 and shown at the 2007 New Zealand International Film Festivals.

=== Establishment of the New Zealand Film Commission: 1970s–1980s ===
In 1978, the New Zealand Film Commission was established. Its aim was to encourage and promote the national film industry, and a number of film projects have been funded by the commission.

One of the first New Zealand films to attract large-scale audiences at home was Sleeping Dogs, directed by Roger Donaldson in 1977. The film, a dark, political action thriller that portrays the reaction of one man to the formation of a totalitarian government and the ensuing guerrilla war, introduced Sam Neill as a leading actor. The imagery of large-scale civil conflict and government repression would be realised only a few years later when the 1981 Springbok Tour caused nationwide protests and clashes with police.

Sleeping Dogs is also notable as the first full-length 35mm feature film made entirely by a New Zealand production crew. Before then, films such as 1973's Rangi's Catch had been shot in New Zealand, where they were set, but were produced and directed by foreign crews.

1981 saw the release of the road film Goodbye Pork Pie, which made NZ$1.5 million. Director Geoff Murphy was lured away by Hollywood, but he made two other key New Zealand films: Utu (1983), about the land wars of the 1860s, and a nuclear-apocalypse science-fiction story, The Quiet Earth (1985). Bruno Lawrence, who appeared in both films, became a star.

Melanie Read was the first woman to write and direct a New Zealand feature film with the 1984 thriller Trial Run. In 1987 Barry Barclay's film Ngati, screenplay by Tama Poata and starring veteran actor Wi Kuki Kaa, was released to critical acclaim and some box-office success. Ngati is recognised as the first feature film to be written and directed by a person of Māori descent.

Merata Mita was the first Māori woman to write and direct a dramatic feature film, when she directed Mauri in 1988. An accomplished documentary film-maker, Mita made landmark documentaries including Bastion Point: Day 507 (1980), about the occupation of land there, and Patu! (1983), a film about the controversial and violent anti-apartheid protests during the 1981 Springboks rugby tour from South Africa.

The late 1980s saw the reinvention of the New Zealand short film, beginning with Alison Maclean's Kitchen Sink. Instead of trying to be short features focused on dialogue and character, the new shorts tried instead to "push the envelope" in terms of visual design and cinematic grammar. An explosion of visually rich and compelling works emerged that seemed to have more in common with European art-house cinema than Hollywood.

Key examples of these are: The Lounge Bar (The Front Lawn), Kitchen Sink (Alison Maclean), A Little Death (Simon Perkins; Paul Swadel), Stroke (Christine Jeffs), La Vie en Rose (Anna Reeves), A Game With No Rules (Scott Reynolds), Eau de la vie (Simon Baré), O Tamaiti (The Children) (Sima Urale) which won the Silver Lion Best Short Film at the Venice Film Festival, and Two Cars, One Night (Taika Waititi), which was nominated for the Best Short Film Oscar.

=== International breakthrough: 1990–2000 ===
The early 1990s saw New Zealand film gain international recognition, most obviously with Jane Campion's The Piano (1993), which won three Academy Awards. Peter Jackson's Heavenly Creatures (1994) and Lee Tamahori's Once Were Warriors also received international acclaim and high grosses in a number of countries. The Piano and Heavenly Creatures showed an increasing tendency for New Zealand films to be partially or completely funded by overseas production companies, and star non-local actors (for example, Holly Hunter and Harvey Keitel in The Piano, and Kate Winslet in Heavenly Creatures). This did not stop the migration of New Zealanders to the United States: Tamahori, Melanie Lynskey of Heavenly Creatures and Canadian-born Piano star Anna Paquin are now all primarily based in America.

A notable exception to the migration tendency is Peter Jackson, who continued to make films in New Zealand. Jackson's career began with low-budget comedies such as Bad Taste (1987) and Meet the Feebles (1989). He was eventually noticed by Hollywood, and in the 2000s directed The Lord of the Rings series. Although made with mainly foreign funding (helped by a tax break from the New Zealand government) and featuring a primarily international cast, Jackson filmed the films in New Zealand, using a largely local production crew, helping create an enormous skill base in the New Zealand film industry.

This has led to a number of prominent Hollywood films being made in New Zealand, with major international productions not only filming there but also using the country's various post-production facilities and special effects companies. Among these films are The Last Samurai and The Chronicles of Narnia: The Lion, the Witch and the Wardrobe. While the funding for these movies has come largely from the United States, the trend has helped New Zealand film studios and filmmakers develop skills and improve facilities.

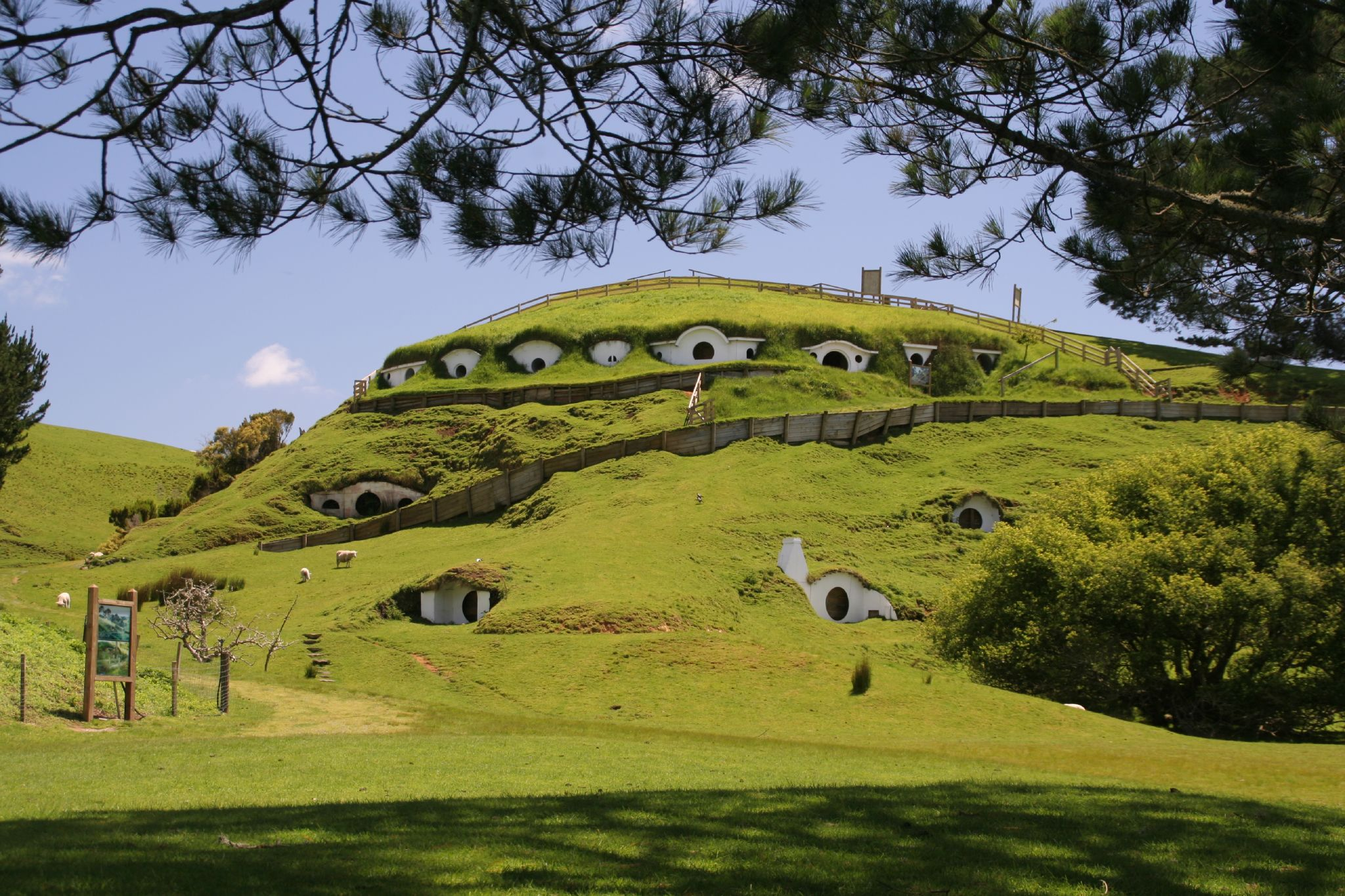
A farm near the town of Matamata in the Waikato stood in for Hobbiton in the Lord of the Rings series.

=== Since 2001 ===
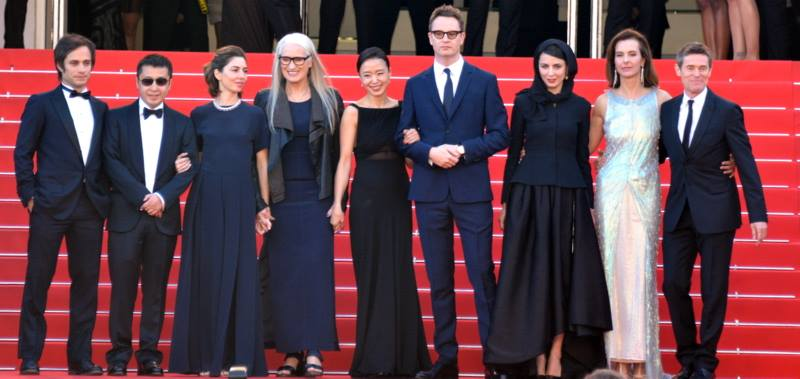
Campion as part of the 2014 Cannes jury (4th on left)

In early 21st century, the amount of local content has significantly increased, with Whale Rider (2002) becoming the second-highest-grossing North American independent film of 2003 and third-highest worldwide, earning $40.1 million. Other notable films include In My Father's Den (2004) and The World's Fastest Indian (2005). Both films did well at the New Zealand box office, with the latter beating Once Were Warriors to become the highest-grossing New Zealand film at the domestic box office, earning over NZ$6.5 million; a record beaten by Boy in 2010.

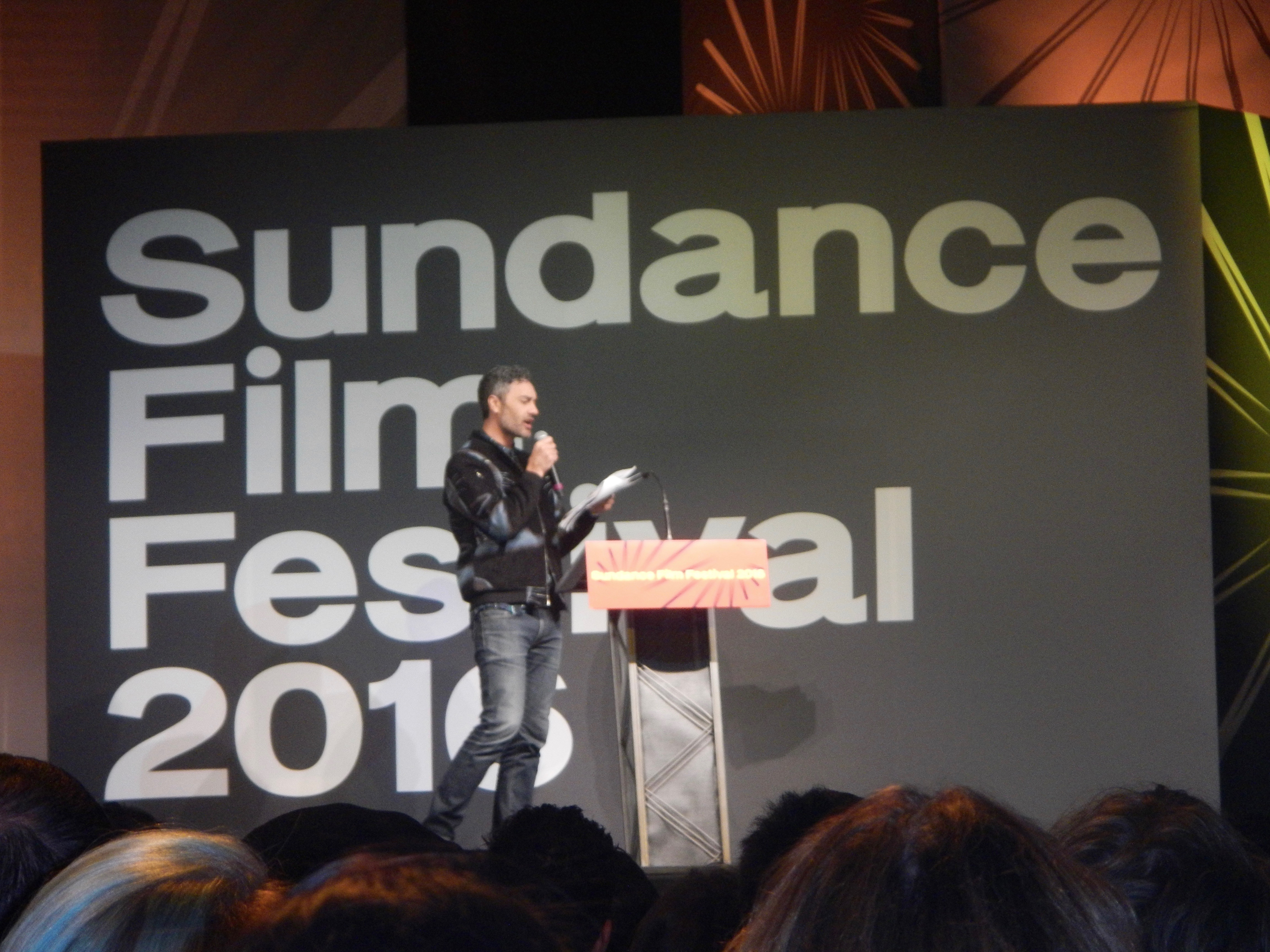
Waititi speaking at Sundance in 2016

The latter part of the first decade of the new century saw the expansion of Peter Jackson's filmmaking empire, with the producer-director optioning the rights to The Lovely Bones, Halo, The Dam Busters and the fantasy series Temeraire. Major productions such as Avatar and the 2007 blockbuster The Water Horse used Jackson's Wellington studios and the services of the special-effects company Weta Digital. US-based video game company Unity Software bought Weta Digital for $1.63bn in 2021.

Eagle vs Shark (2007) was director Taika Waititi's first feature film, starring Jemaine Clement and Loren Horsley. The film earned over US$1 million at the box office. Waititi's film Boy, released in 2010, topped the box office receipts for the opening week, earning more on its opening day than any previous locally made film, becoming the highest-grossing New Zealand film of all time. In 2014 the mockumentary What We Do in the Shadows, directed by Waititi and Clement, was released to substantial critical acclaim. Two years later, Waititi released Hunt for the Wilderpeople, starring Sam Neill and Julian Dennison, a film that became the new highest-grossing opening weekend box office New Zealand film on home soil, beating the record set by Boy six years prior.

New Zealand is grappling with the effect of international streaming platforms in the New Zealand market. In 2023 the New Zealand's screen producers' guild, SPADA pointed out international streamers currently 'pay no tax in New Zealand, face no regulation, and use broadband infrastructure partially funded by our Government while at the same time impact local broadcasting viewership and advertising revenue'. Regulating this would be in-line with many other countries.

== New Zealand Film Archive ==
The New Zealand Film Archive was founded and incorporated on 9 March 1981. Film enthusiast, critic and historian Jonathan Dennis (1953–2002) was a driving force behind the archive, and became its first director. The archive was set up to preserve and restore significant New Zealand film and television images. It now holds a collection of much of early New Zealand cinema film and holds public screenings of its collection.

Much of the early cinema film made in New Zealand has been lost, as it was printed on nitrate, which is unstable. In 1992, when film enthusiasts and the New Zealand Film Archive realised how much of New Zealand's film heritage was being lost, they mounted the Last Film Search and found 7,000 significant films, both in New Zealand and around the world.

== Highest-grossing films shot in New Zealand ==
Highest-grossing films shot in New Zealand
Rank	Title	Year of release	Director	Filming location	Worldwide gross (US$)
1	Avatar	2009	James Cameron	Wellington	$2,923,706,026
2	The Lord of the Rings: The Return of the King	2003	Peter Jackson	New Zealand-wide	$1,138,267,537
3	The Hobbit: An Unexpected Journey	2012	Peter Jackson	New Zealand-wide	$1,017,107,150
4	The Hobbit: The Battle of the Five Armies	2014	Peter Jackson	New Zealand-wide	$962,253,946
5	The Hobbit: The Desolation of Smaug	2013	Peter Jackson	New Zealand-wide	$959,079,095
6	A Minecraft Movie	2025	Jared Hess	Huntly and Auckland	$957,749,195
7	The Lord of the Rings: The Two Towers	2002	Peter Jackson	New Zealand-wide	$938,242,927
8	The Lord of the Rings: The Fellowship of the Ring	2001	Peter Jackson	New Zealand-wide	$888,195,122
9	King Kong	2005	Peter Jackson	Wellington and Auckland	$556,906,378
10	The Last Samurai	2003	Edward Zwick	Taranaki Region	$454,627,263

== Personalities ==
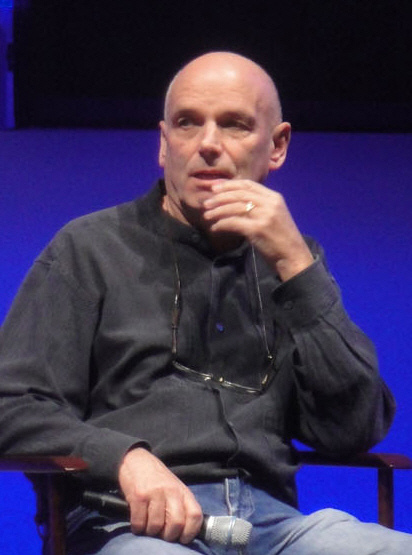
Martin Campbell
BAFTA winner; director of Casino Royale

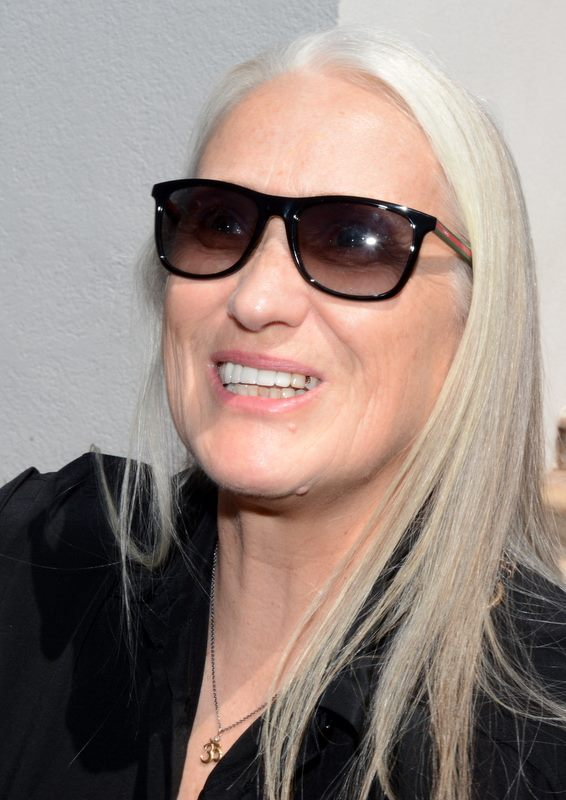
Jane Campion
Academy and Palme d'Or winner for The Piano

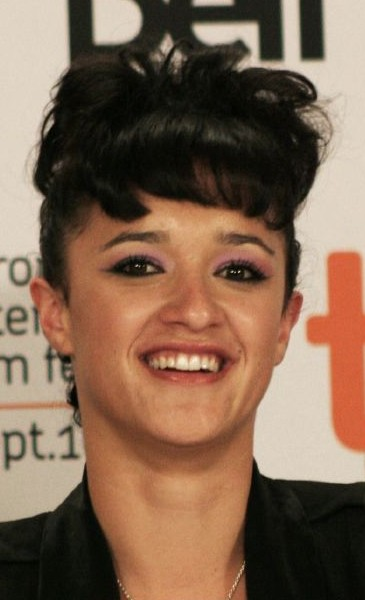
Keisha Castle-Hughes
Academy Award nominee for Whale Rider

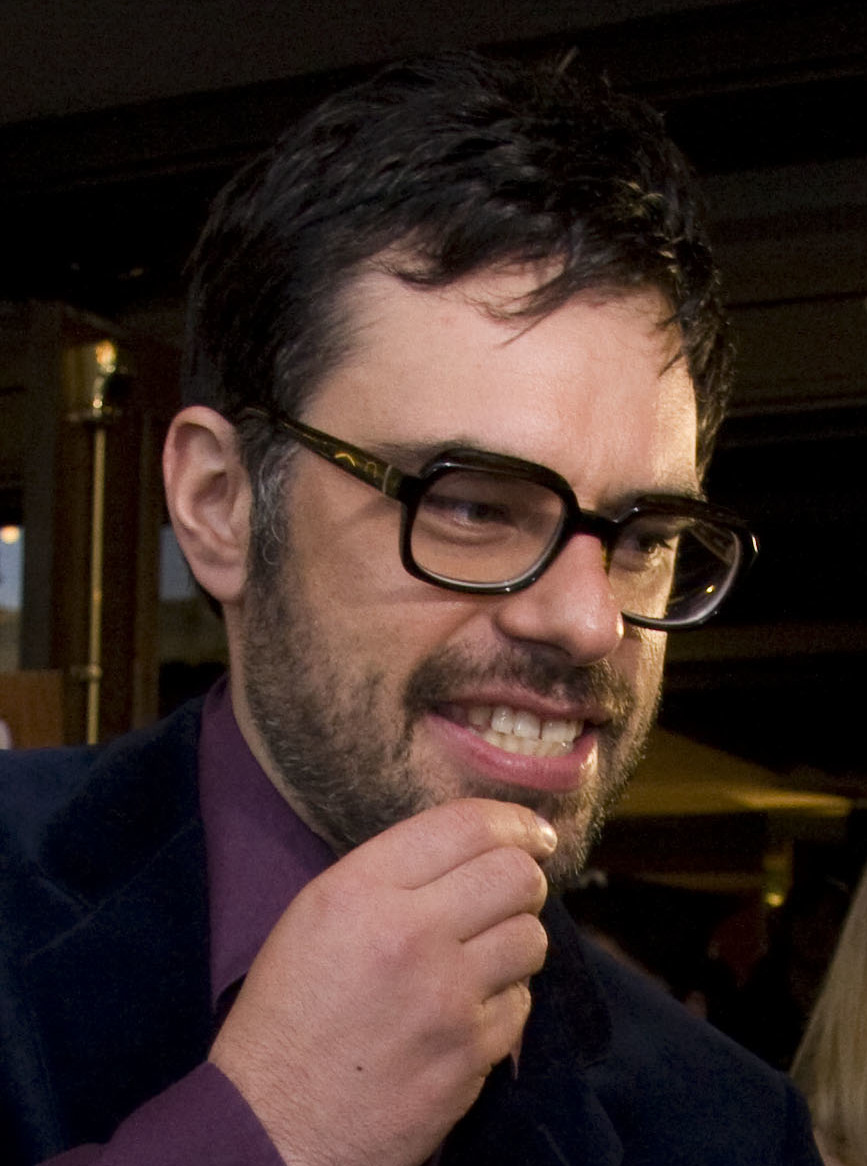
Jemaine Clement
What We Do in the Shadows actor and director

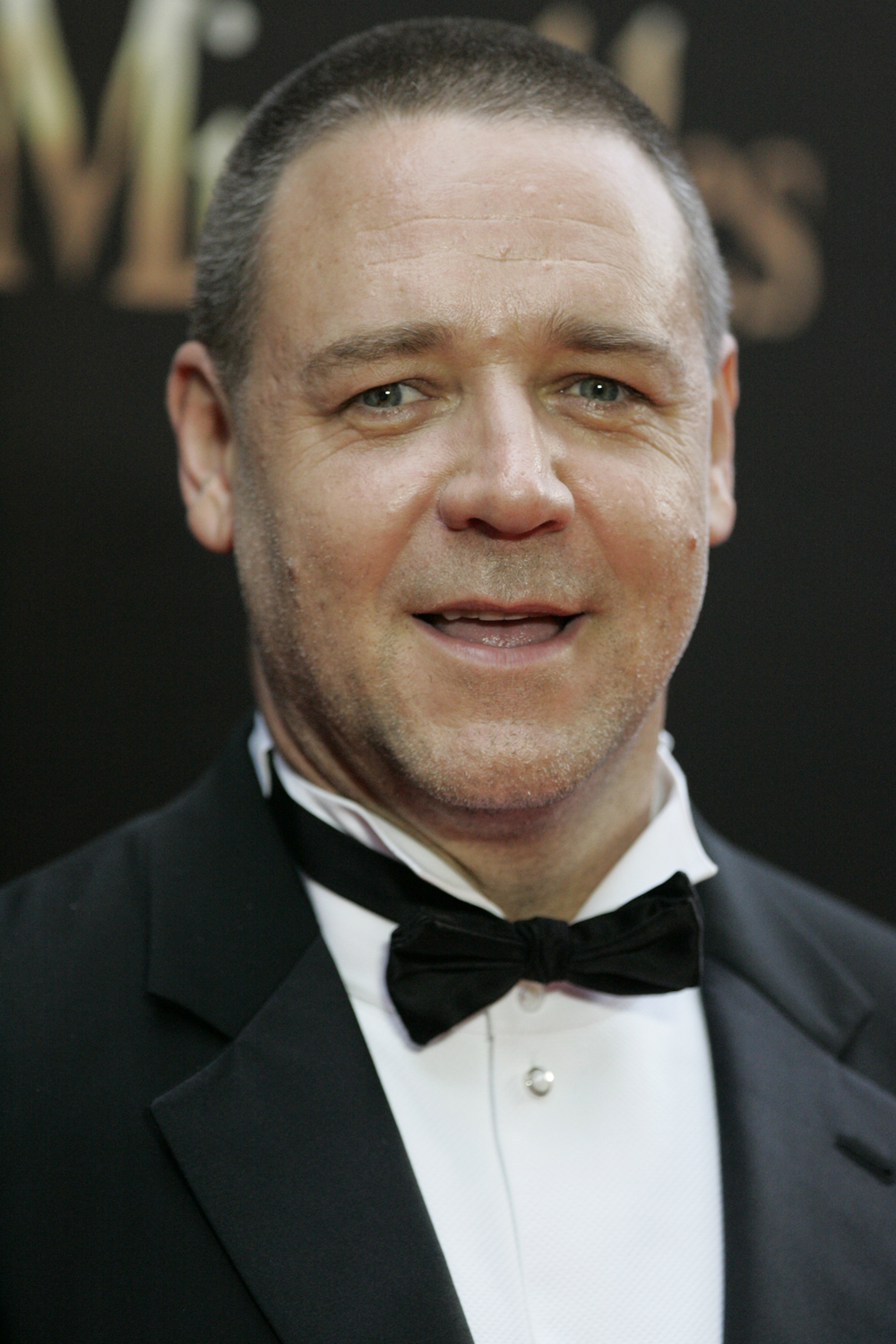
Russell Crowe
Academy Award winner for Gladiator

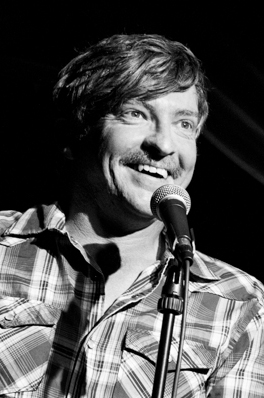
Rhys Darby
actor, Flight of the Conchords, Hunt for the Wilderpeople

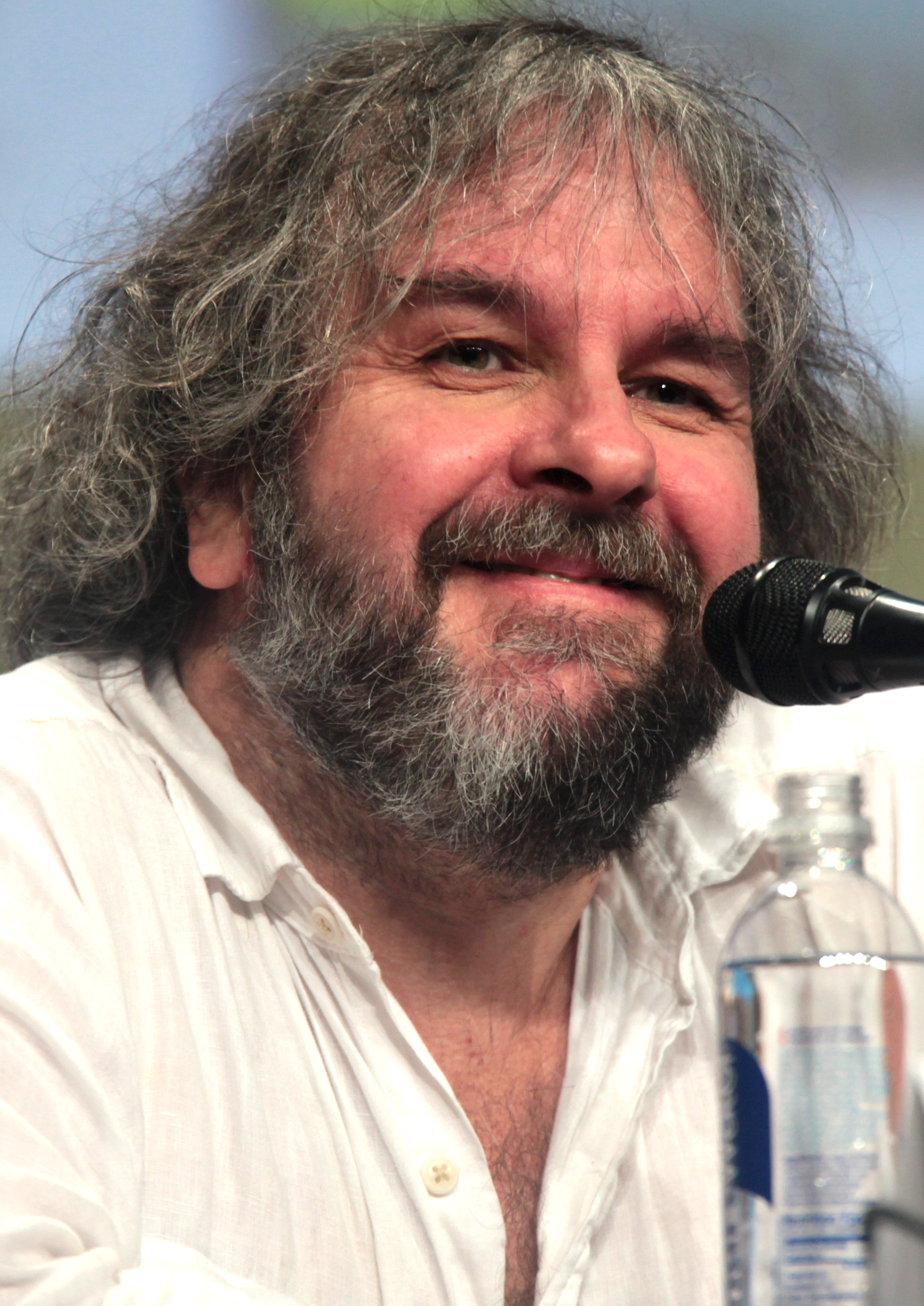
Peter Jackson
Academy Award-winner, director of The Lord of the Rings

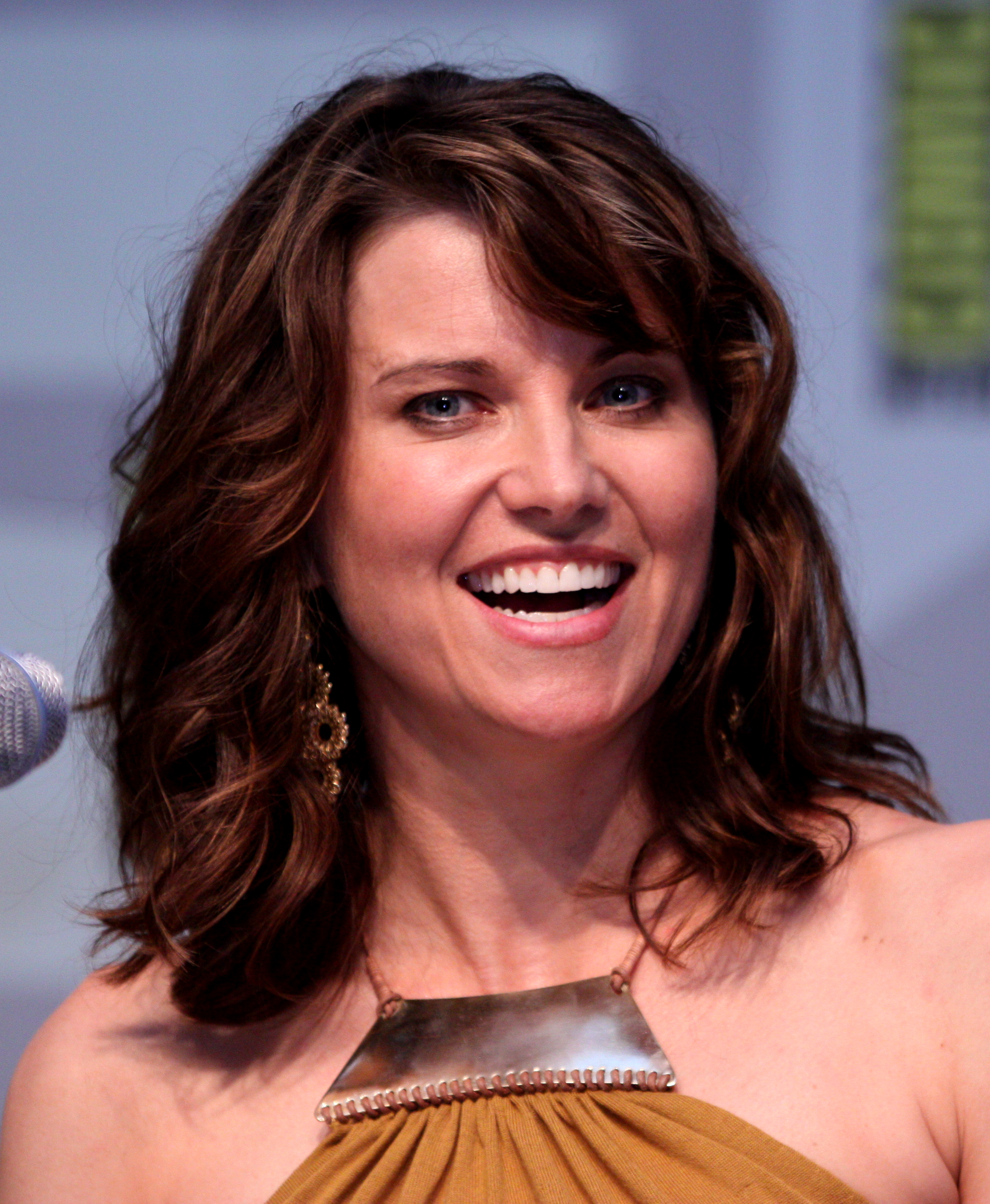
Lucy Lawless
star of Xena: Warrior Princess

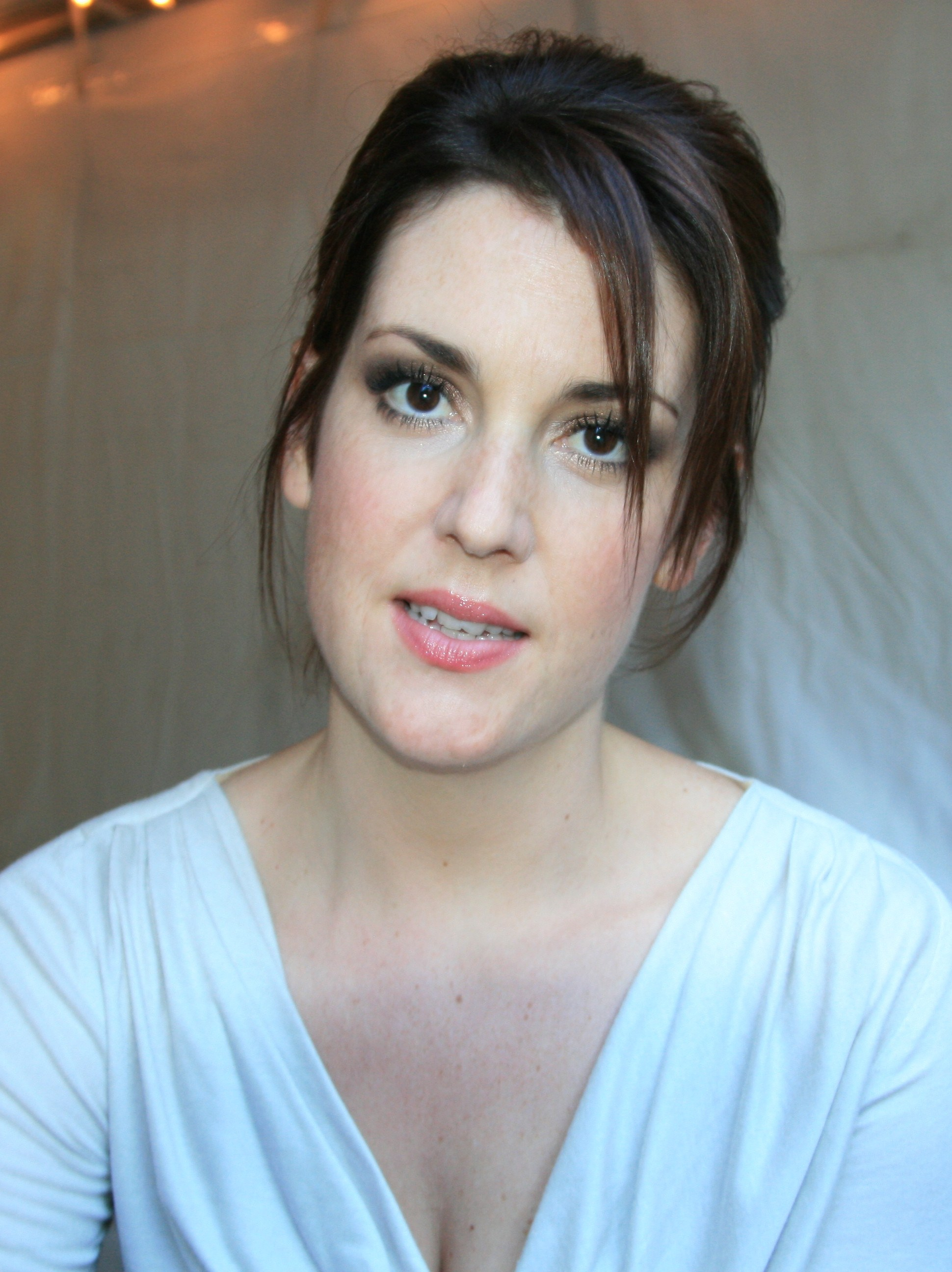
Melanie Lynskey
actress, star of Heavenly Creatures, Two and a Half Men and Yellowjackets

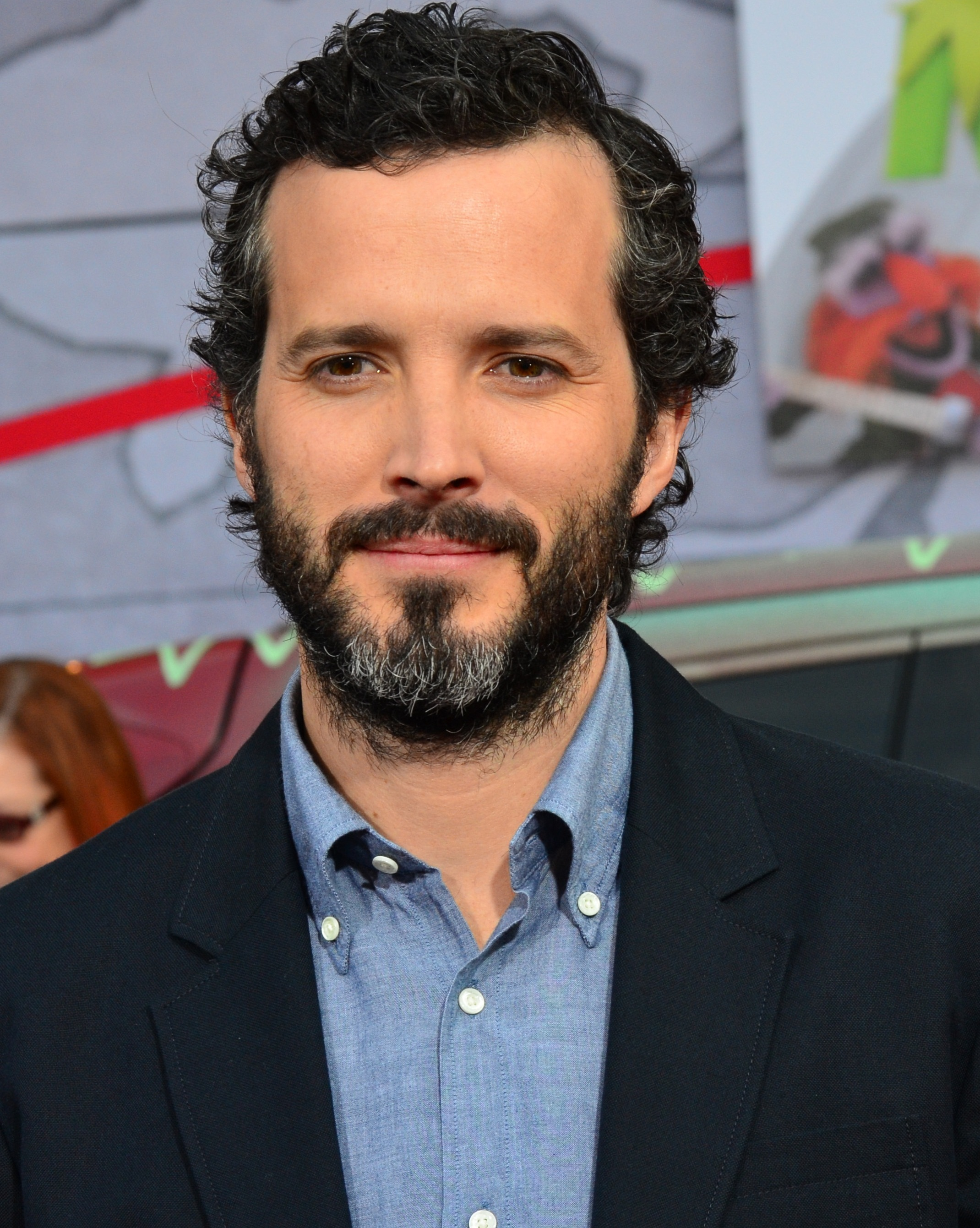
Bret McKenzie
Grammy Award and Academy Award-winner for The Muppets

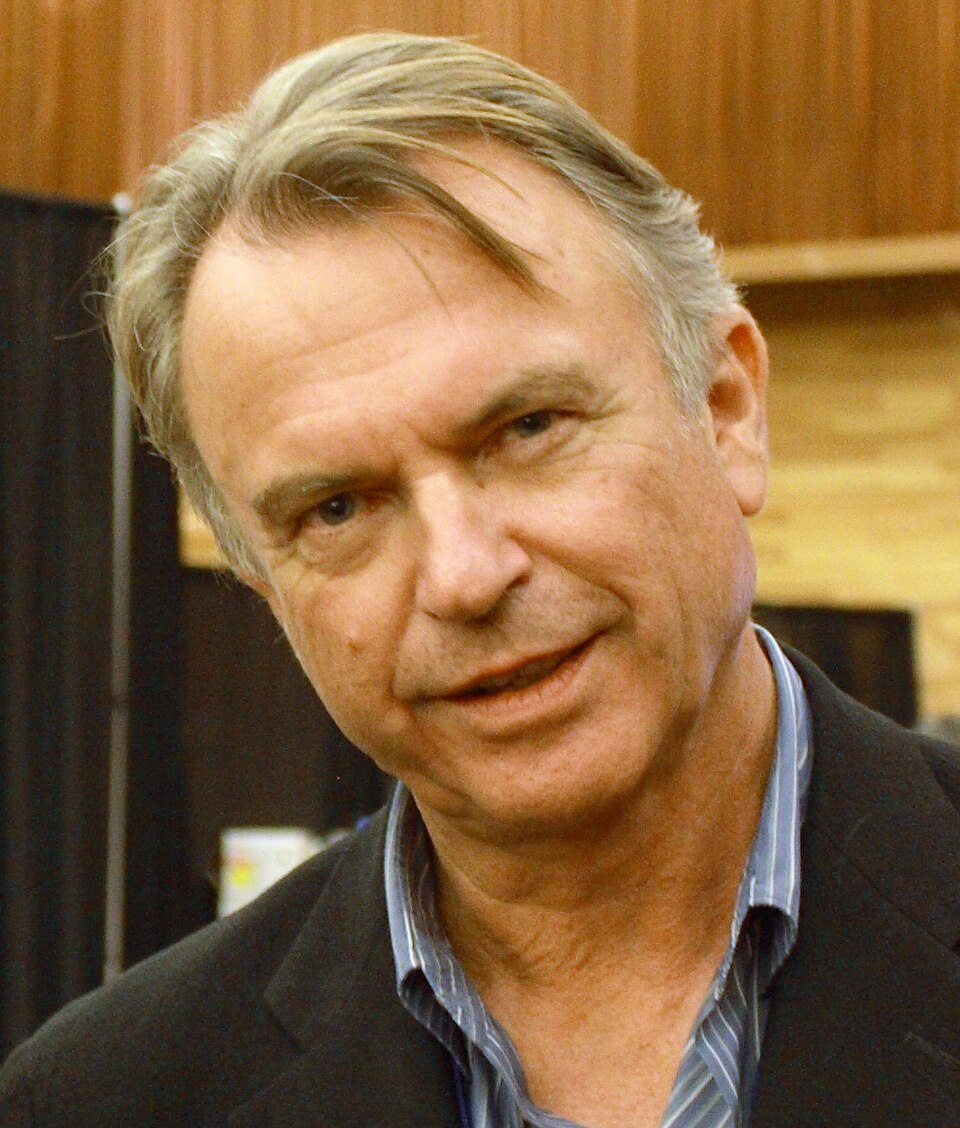
Sam Neill
Emmy and Golden Globe nominee, star of Jurassic Park

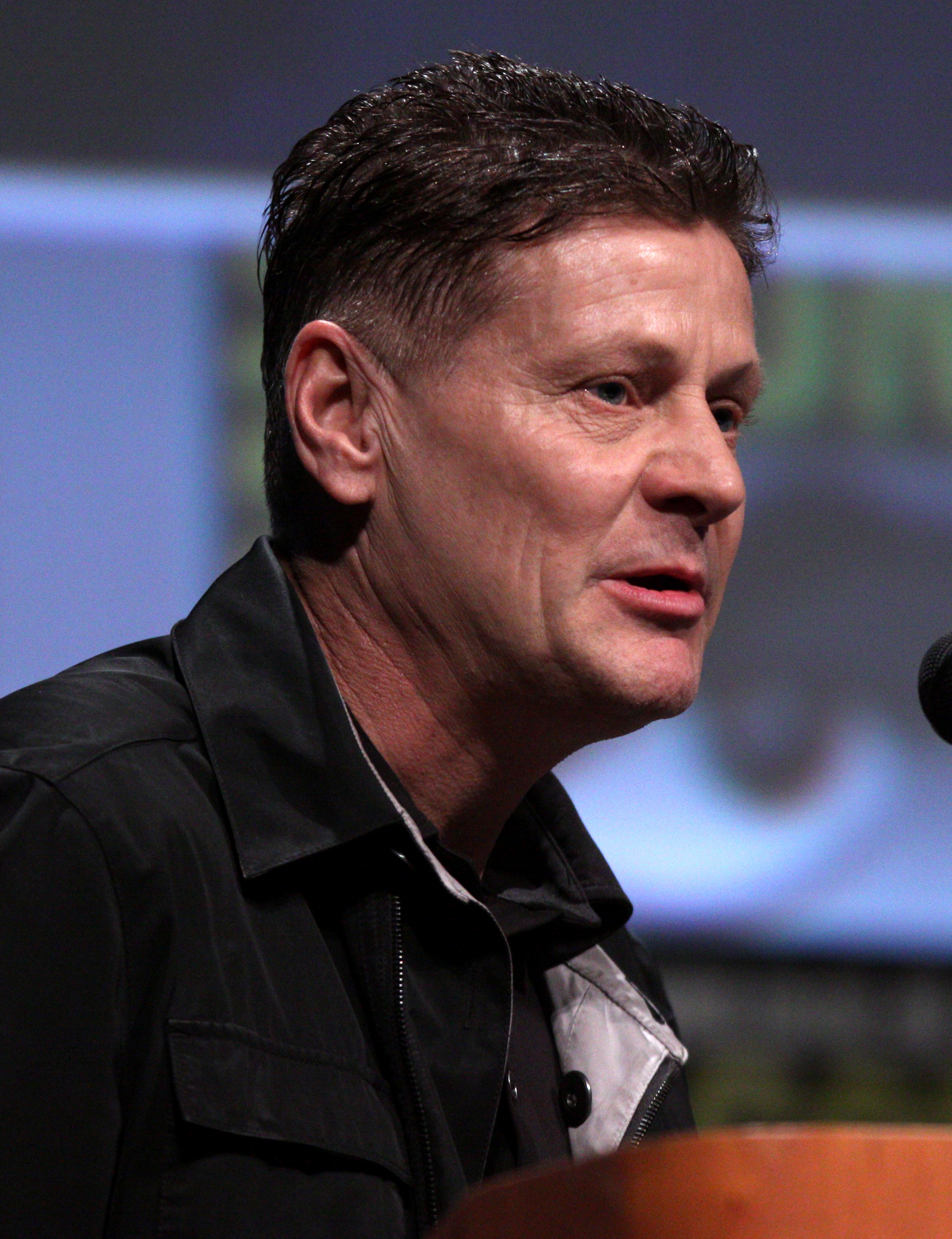
Andrew Niccol
BAFTA winner, director of Gattaca

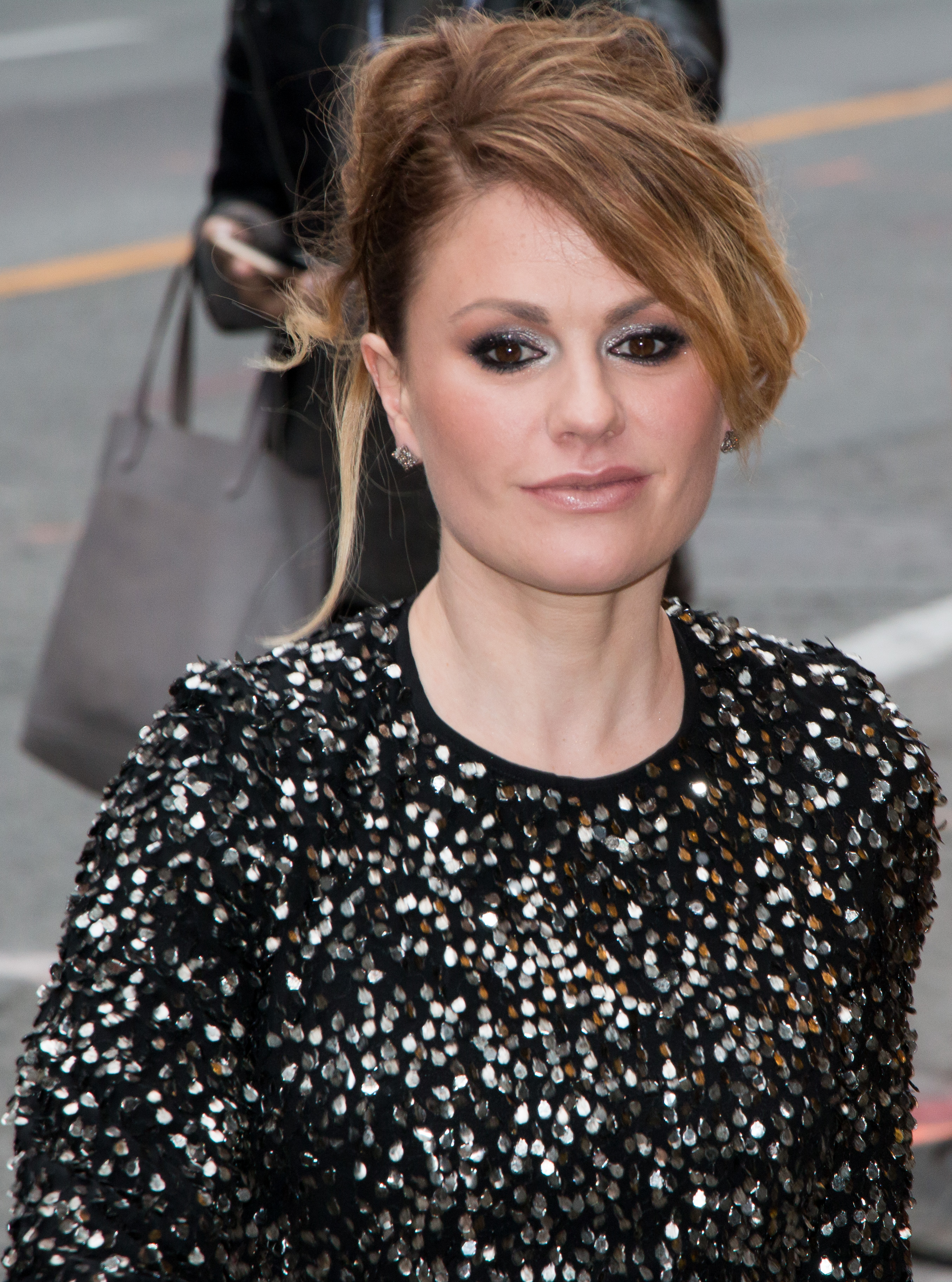
Anna Paquin
Academy Award winner for The Piano, star of True Blood

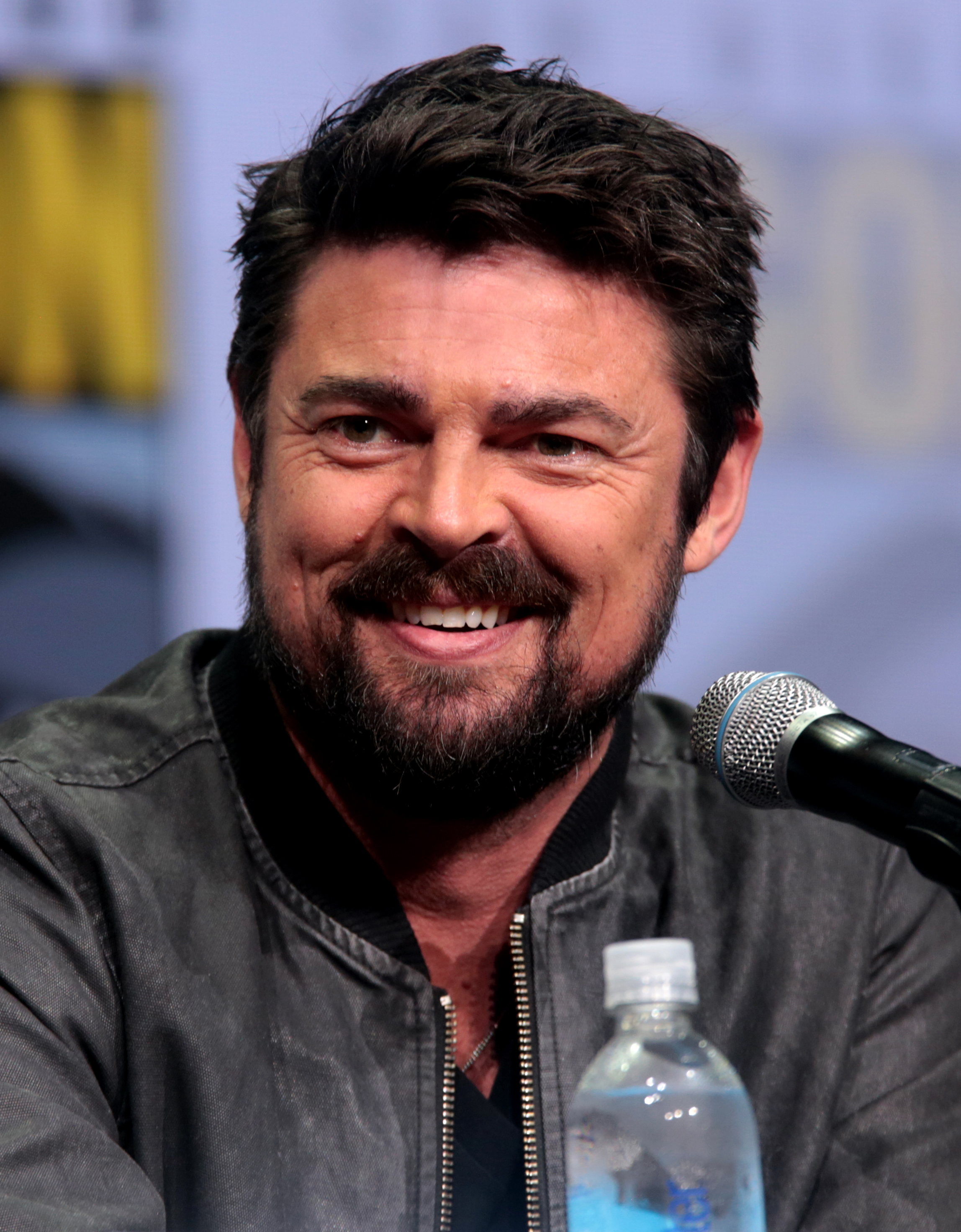
Karl Urban
actor, star of Dredd and The Boys

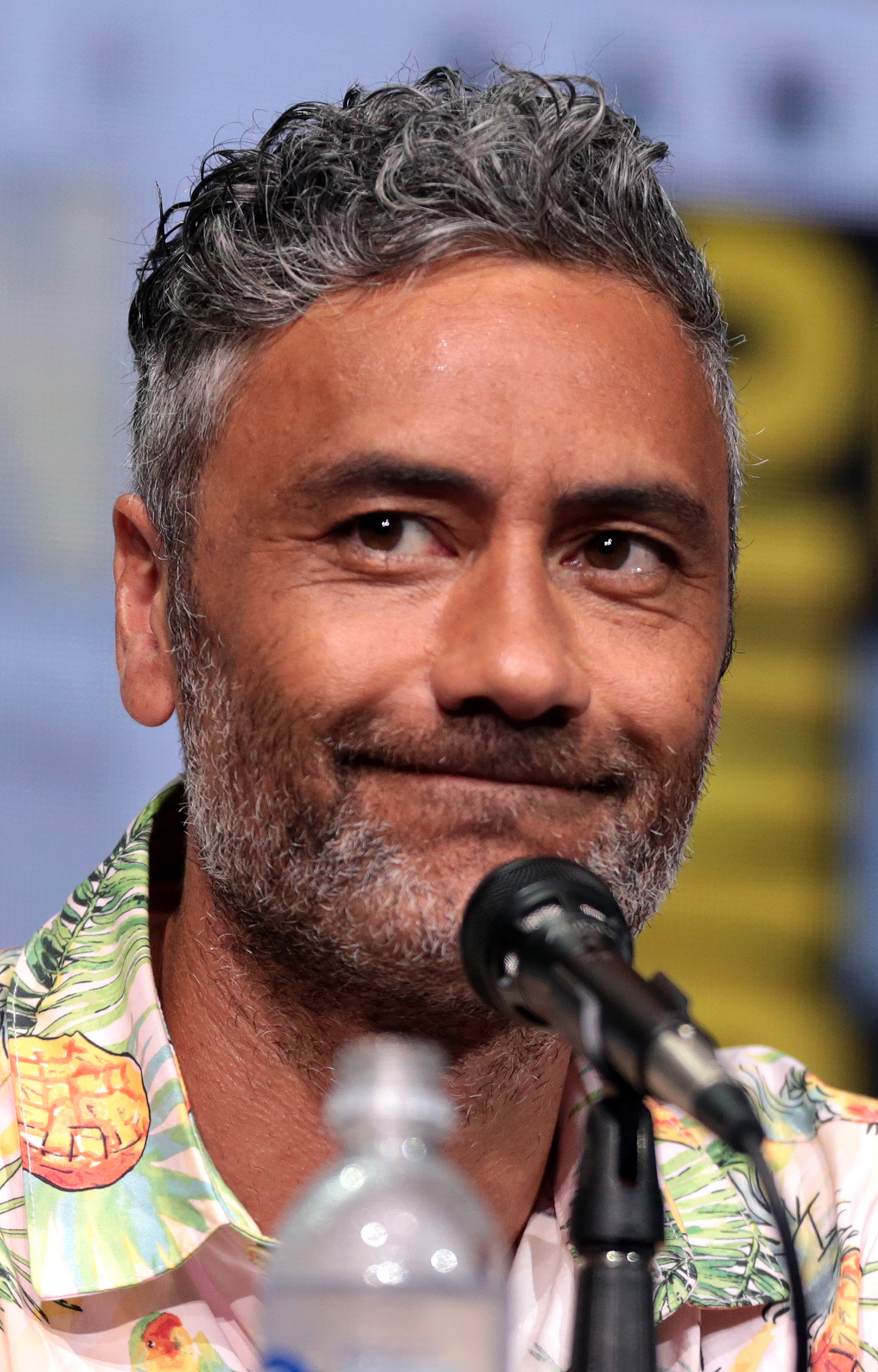
Taika Waititi
Academy Award winner, director of Thor: Ragnarok and Hunt for the Wilderpeople

=== Other notable feature directors ===
Name	Notable works	Notes
Andrew Adamson	Shrek & Shrek 2, The Narnia film series	Academy Award-winner
Niki Caro	Whale Rider, North Country	BAFTA- winner
Roger Donaldson	The Bounty, Dante's Peak, Cocktail, The World's Fastest Indian, The Recruit	Golden Palm-nominee
Ellory Elkayem	Eight Legged Freaks	
Ian Mune	Came a Hot Friday, What Becomes of the Broken Hearted?	Notable also as actor and screenwriter
Geoff Murphy	Goodbye Pork Pie, Young Guns II	
Melanie Rodriga	Teesh and Trude	Nominated for three AACTA Awards
Robert Sarkies	Scarfies, Out of the Blue, Two Little Boys	
Lee Tamahori	The Edge, Die Another Day, Along Came a Spider, Once Were Warriors	
Vincent Ward	River Queen, What Dreams May Come	Two-time Golden Palm nominee

=== Other notable actors ===
Name	Notable works	Notes
Marton Csokas	The Lord of the Rings, Kingdom of Heaven, Romulus, My Father	
Cliff Curtis	Sunshine, Collateral Damage, Once Were Warriors, Whale Rider, Fear the Walking Dead	
Alan Dale	Ugly Betty, The O.C., LOST	SAG nominee
Daniel Gillies	Spider-Man 2 & Spider-Man 3	
Martin Henderson	The Ring, Flyboys, Torque, Off the Map	
Manu Bennett	Spartacus, The Hobbit (film series), Arrow	
Wi Kuki Kaa	Ngati, Utu, The Bounty	
Bruno Lawrence	Smash Palace, Race for the Yankee Zephyr, Utu, The Quiet Earth, The Rainbow Warrior	
Temuera Morrison	Once Were Warriors, Speed 2: Cruise Control, Star Wars: Episode II – Attack of the Clones	
Jessica Rose	I Know Who Killed Me, lonelygirl15	Gained fame on YouTube
Antony Starr	The Boys, Banshee	

== See also ==
- Antipodean Film Festival
- List of films set in New Zealand
- List of New Zealand film makers
- List of New Zealand films
- New Zealand Film Archive
- New Zealand Film Commission
- New Zealand International Film Festival
