= A Little Death =

1995 short New Zealand film

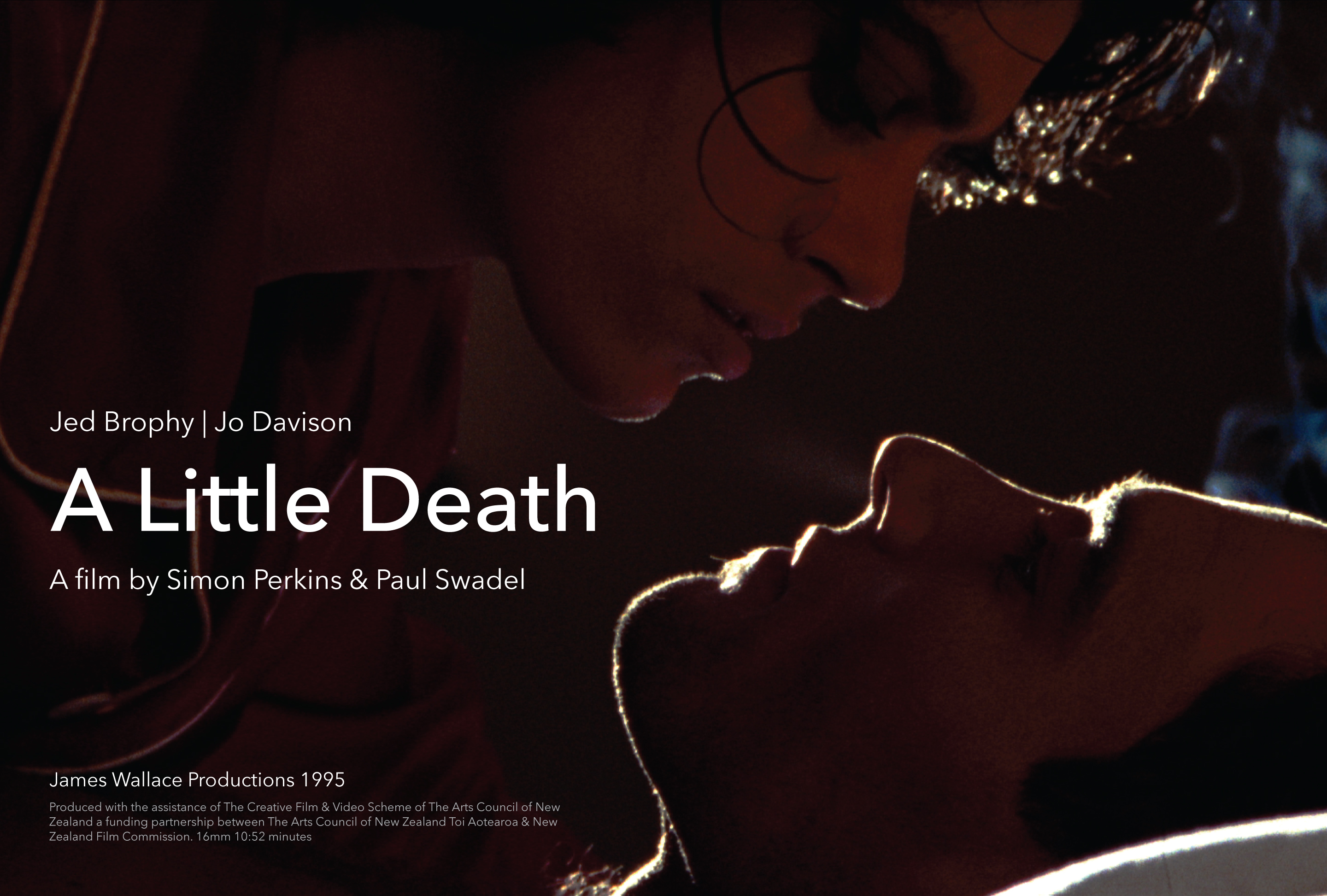
- English: A Little Death
- Directed by: Simon Perkins; Paul Swadel
- Written by: Simon Perkins; Paul Swadel
- Screenplay by: Simon Perkins; Paul Swadel
- Story by: Simon Perkins; Paul Swadel
- Produced by: James Wallace
- Starring: Jed Brophy; Josephine Davison
- Cinematography: Peter Bannan
- Edited by: Peter Evans
- Music by: Dave Whitehead
- Production company: James Wallace Productions
- Distributed by: Creative New Zealand
- Release dates: January 1, 1995 (Auckland, NZ)
- Running time: 10:52 minutes
- Country: New Zealand
- Language: English
- Budget: (NZD) $13643

A Little Death is a 16mm short film that was created by Simon Perkins and Paul Swadel in 1995. The film was nominated for Best Short Film in the New Zealand Film and TV Awards in 1995.

== Plot ==
A Little Death has a somewhat abstract plot - a man and a woman are having sex, at the moment of orgasm (the “little death” of the title), the man is suddenly trapped behind an image. At this point, the film changes from colour to black and white. The woman damages the images of the man, which in turn damages the trapped man. The woman eventually comforts the man, and he returns to his normal form.

== Production ==
Simon Perkins and Paul Swadel started production of the film in the mid 1990s - with Swadel joining the project while he was studying for an MA in intermedia at Auckland University's Elam School of Fine of Arts.

The script for this film was written as a Beatscript rather than a conventional screenplay.

== Reception ==
A Little Death attracted critical acclaim, and the attention of awards committees. It was a finalist in the 1996 New Zealand Film and Television Awards, and the 1996 Hamburg Film Festival.

The film has been recognised as one of a select number of early NZ short films which pushed the envelope in terms of visual design and cinematic language, and cited as one of a select number of shorts that heralded The Coming of Age of The New Zealand Short Film (Paul Shannon, 1995).
