= Mauri (film) =

1988 New Zealand film by Merata Mita

- Directed by: Merata Mita
- Written by: Merata Mita
- Produced by: Merata Mita
- Starring: Anzac Wallace; Eva Rickard; James Heyward
- Cinematography: Graeme Cowley
- Edited by: Nicholas Beauman
- Music by: Hirini Melbourne
- Production company: Awatea Films
- Release date: 1988
- Running time: 101 min.
- Country: New Zealand
- Languages: Māori; English

Mauri is a 1988 New Zealand film directed by Merata Mita. It is a significant work of indigenous filmmaking, and of New Zealand filmmaking in general.

== Synopsis ==
It depicts a woman living in a modest home where she cooks over a hearth fire. The story provides insights into family life and social relationships within the community, portraying kindness and mutual support among its members, while presenting the British and their local supporters in a more antagonistic role.

== Cast ==
- Anzac Wallace as Rewi Rapana
- Eva Rickard as Kara
- James Heyward as Steve
- Susan D. Ramari Paul as Ramari
- Sonny Waru as Hemi
- Rangamarie Delamere as Awatea
- Willie Raana as Willie Rapana
- Geoff Murphy as Mr. Semmens
- Don Selwyn as Old Cop
- Temuera Morrison as Young Cop
- Ana Hine Aro Kura as Hinemoa
- Anthony Angell as Tawa
- Mitchell Insley as Dave Roberts
- Joanna Paul as Doctor
- John Algar as Pakeha Minister
- Mando Waenga as Sergeant at Arms
- Bernard Rua as Herb
- Mas Campbell as Chief Hula Girl
- Hiria Lake as Chief Hula Girl
- Martyn Sanderson as Hospital Doctor

== Reviews ==
- 2001 - Festival de cinéma de Douarnenez-France
- 2019 - Venice Classics
- 2019 - Aussie and Kiwi Film Festival Prague
- 2020 - Hawaii International Film Festival
- 2020 - San Diego Asian Film Festival
- 2021 - imagineNATIVE Film and Media Arts Festival National Indigenous Month Programme
