= The Silent One (film) =

- Directed by: Yvonne Mackay
- Written by: Ian Mune
- Produced by: Dave Gibson
- Starring: Telo Malase; Pat Evison
- Cinematography: Ian Paul
- Edited by: Jamie Selkirk
- Music by: Jenny McLeod
- Release date: 1984
- Running time: 102 min
- Country: New Zealand
- Language: English
- Budget: $3,000,000

The Silent One is a 1984 New Zealand children's film that was filmed in the Cook Islands. It was directed by Yvonne Mackay and was based on a novel by Joy Cowley. It starred Telo Malase, a Samoan student from Auckland in a story about a boy and a turtle. The turtle featured in the film, Big Mama, died soon after filming was finished.

== Cast ==
- Telo Malase as Jonasi
- Pat Evison as Luisa
- George Henare as Paui Te Po
- Anzac Wallace as Tasiri
- Rongo Tupatea Kahukuranui as Taruga
- Reg Ruka as Bulai

== Reception ==
Helen Martin in New Zealand film, 1912-1996 said "Although the plot is overloaded with incident, and at times the choreography of the crowd scenes is overly theatrical and some performances are overplayed, the boy and the turtle are a winning buddy pair."

In LA Weekly Les Paul Robley said "Picturesque scenery can't overcome the weakness of the tale, the slow pace and Mackay's meager visual sense. The acting and direction are at times so incompetent that eventually the only things worth watching are the lush island photography by Ian Paul (which succumbs to its own self-conscious beauty) and pretty underwater material by Ron and Valerie Taylor."

Rick Brough of The Park Record gave it 4 stars and said ""The Silent One" is a pleasant movie to drink in. It's a Disneyesque fable from New Zealand distinguished by its sincerity and the novelty of its South Sea setting." The Age's Neil Jillett says "'The Silent One's' virtue outweigh its faults. Jonasi's silence never commits the film to dreary bouts of mime, and the relationship between boy and turtle is beautifully realised."
