= Mana Waka =

1990 film directed by Merata Mita

- Directed by: Merata Mita
- Produced by: Te Puea Estate
- Narrated by: Tukuroirangi Morgan
- Cinematography: R.G.H Manley
- Edited by: Annie Collins
- Release date: 1990
- Running time: 85 min.
- Country: New Zealand
- Languages: English; Māori

Mana Waka is a 1990 New Zealand film documenting the construction of waka for the 1940 centenary of the Treaty of Waitangi. It uses footage shot between 1937 and 1940 by R.G.H Manley, and edited 50 years later by Annie Collins and director Merata Mita.

== Original footage ==
In 1937, in anticipation of the 1940 centennial celebrations, Māori leader Princess Te Puea commissioned seven waka taua (war canoes), in an attempt to recreate the legendary seven canoes of the Māori migration, though only three were built due to funding shortages. Stills photographer R.G.H "Jim" Manley was asked to film the process, from the felling of massive trees to the maiden voyage. The filming also met financial hurdles and never entered post-production.

The waka named Ngātokimatawhaorua was ultimately launched on Waitangi Day, 6 February 1940. It is launched every February and is housed at the Waitangi Treaty Grounds. The other two waka, Tumanako and Te Rangatahi, are located at Tūrangawaewae and sail annually during the Tūrangawaewae Regatta.

== Reconstruction ==
In 1983, the New Zealand Film Archive began restoring the footage. Merata Mita joined the project in August 1989, editing the film on location at Tūrangawaewae Marae so that the materials could be handled with traditional blessing practices, and to allow elders originally present in the 1930s to advise. As the original film was almost completely silent, the soundtrack was created from scratch based on the remembrances of these elders.

Disagreements between Mita and the family of R.G.H Manley over the direction of the film came to a head after an early workprint screening, when family members took the workprint from the projection booth. A period of mediation occurred afterwards, though contention over the ownership of the original footage persists.

Mana Waka premiered at Auckland’s Civic Theatre on 21 January 1990. Its next public screening was twenty-one years later at the 2011 New Zealand International Film Festival. It was one of fifteen films chosen by the New Zealand Film Archive in 1995 to represent the country’s most important cinematic heritage, in response to a UNESCO survey.
