= Patu! =

1983 documentary by Merata Mita

- Release poster
- Directed by: Merata Mita
- Produced by: Merata Mita
- Cinematography: Barry Harbet
- Edited by: Annie Collins
- Music by: Diatribe, Tia Kingi, Syd Melbourne, Haruru Mai
- Release date: 1983
- Running time: 112 min.
- Country: New Zealand
- Languages: English; Māori

Patu! is a 1983 New Zealand documentary film directed by Merata Mita about the controversial 1981 Springbok tour. It follows the inner workings of the campaign against the tour, and captures scenes of violent conflict between police and protesters. It is a significant work of activist and indigenous filmmaking, and of New Zealand filmmaking in general.

== Background ==
New Zealand's All Blacks and South Africa's Springboks have been frequent rugby rivals since 1921.

As early as 1928 Māori All Blacks: George Nepia and Jimmy Mill were excluded from touring South Africa because their presence was deemed to likely be "embarrassing". A protest campaign "No Māori, no tour" in 1960 errupted when the NZRFU sent an all white tour to South Africa. Anglican bishop Wiremu Panapa led a petition for equality between Māori and Pākehā. A Multiracial All Black team toured South Africa in 1970 but only if it called Maori players like Sid Going "Honorary whites". In a 1976, Lancaster Park, Christchurch 'pitch invasion' Barry Thomas and friends wrote "WELCOME TO RACIST GAME" in 20ft. high letters aimed at the TV cameras - using weedkiller because the game had two white Springboks playing.

The protests that met the 1981 tour were some of the most volatile in New Zealand history. It is said the campaign split the country between pro-tour and anti-tour, not least because of rugby's place in the country's national identity. The documentary takes a decisively anti-tour perspective, pointing the conversation about South African apartheid towards racial discrimination practiced in New Zealand.

== Production history ==
In Wellington thirteen film makers, independent of Mita, coalesced around Vanguard Films and some also filmed in other parts of the country. This was our film, our "fight for egalitarianism." "We begged and borrowed to document our taonga fight, we never saw a penny." All that material forms a large part of Patu. Mita began producing Patu as a 25-minute documentary for TVNZ, although its sensitive politics would necessitate the completion of the film independently. The film was created on a $41,000 budget contributed to by the New Zealand Film Commission, the Arts Council of New Zealand, and the National Catholic Commission. Seventeen camera operators and thirteen sound recordists are credited for the finished film, though Mita also used family members in the crew. They worked without pay, and often in dangerous circumstances.

The editing process lasted two years, complicated by the various types of film stock used, the refusal of television networks to lend footage, and the need to protect the negatives from being seized by police as evidence. Mita complained of police harassment as they regularly visited her house on this pretence.

== Release history ==
Patu! premiered at the 1983 Wellington Film Festival to a standing ovation. A shorter 83-minute version had further screenings at international film festivals. It was not shown on New Zealand television until the 10th anniversary of the tour in 1991.

== Credits ==
- Merata Mita - Director, Producer
- Annie Collins - Editor
- Tama Poata - Subject
- Gaylene Preston - Coordinator
- Martyn Sanderson - Coordinator
- Gerd Pohlmann - Lead Sound Recordist, Coordinator
- Brian Shennan - Sound Mix

Camera

- Barry Harbert - Lead
- Richard S Long
- Waka Attewell
- Chris Barrett
- Alister Barry
- James Bartle
- Alun Bollinger
- Russell Campbell
- Barry Thomas
- Roger Donaldson
- Euan Frizzell
- Chris Ghent
- Allen Guilford
- Leon Narbey
- Rod Prosser
- Mike Single
- Gerard Smyth

Sound

- B. Allen
- R. Brittenden
- T. Johnson
- D. Keen
- B.Thomas
- D. Newton
- T. Woolams
- H. Bollinger
- R.Campbell
- D. Goodman
- G. Phillips
- S. Upston

== Reception and legacy ==
Patu! has been acclaimed as a historical document and as a cinematic polemic. It has been called one of New Zealand's most important documentaries. Along with Canadian Abenaki Alanis Obomsawin’s films like 1984’s Incident at Restigouche and Mita’s earlier 1978 film Bastion Point: Day 507, Patu! is an early example of indigenous female filmmaking. The film has met with criticism for depicting the events solely from the perspective of the protesters, and accusations of bias and partisanship. Mita has responded "The Pakeha bias in all things recorded in Aotearoa was never questioned... Yes, Patu! has a Māori perspective, but it does not override the mass mobilisation of New Zealand's white middle class, neither does it take credit from those who rightly deserve it".

In 2012, the 1983 theatrical cut of Patu! and supporting materials were added to the UNESCO Memory of the World Aotearoa New Zealand Ngā Mahara o te Ao register.
