= Annie Collins =

New Zealand film editor

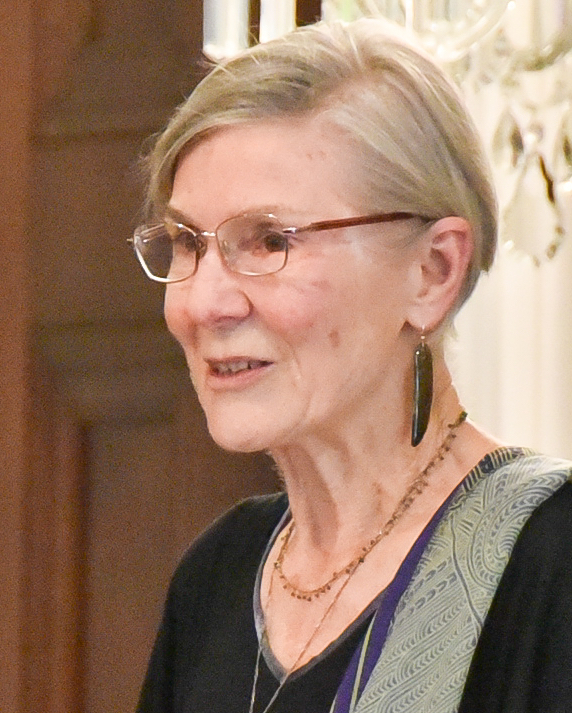
- Collins in 2020
- Occupation: Film editor

Annie Collins is a film editor from New Zealand, best known for her work on The Return of the King. She was a film conformer on The Fellowship of the Ring, and moved up to assistant editor on The Two Towers. Her work with Jamie Selkirk (as an "additional editor") helped earn The Return of the King an Oscar for Best Editing in 2004.

== Filmography ==
- Solo - assistant editor, 1978
- Goodbye Pork Pie - sound editor, 1981
- Patu! - editor, 1983
- The Neglected Miracle - editor, 1985
- Mana Waka - editor, 1990
- Xmas for Lou - editor, 1992
- Once Were Warriors - dialogue supervisor, 1994
- Tamaiti, O - editor, 1996
- Scarfies - editor, 1999
- The Lord of the Rings: The Fellowship of the Ring - film conformer, 2001
- The Lord of the Rings: The Two Towers - assistant editor, 2002
- Kombi Nation - editor, 2003
- The Lord of the Rings: The Return of the King - additional editor, 2003
- Out of the Blue - editor, 2006
- Barry Barclay: The Camera on the Shore - editor 2010
- Shopping - editor 2013
- Consent: The Louise Nicholas Story - editor 2014
- One Thousand Ropes - editor 2017
- Coming Home in the Dark - editor 2021
