= Tim Eliott =

- Born: Timothy James Gordon Eliott; 25 March 1935; Eltham, New Zealand
- Died: 22 April 2011 (aged 76); Wentworth Falls, New South Wales, Australia
- Occupation: Actor

Timothy James Gordon Eliott (25 March 1935 – 22 April 2011) was a New Zealand actor.

== Biography ==
Eliott was born in Eltham, South Taranaki, New Zealand on 25 March 1935. His mother died when he was one and he was brought up by aunts and grandparents until he joined his father in England after the war where he went to public schools in Bath and Bristol. He returned to New Zealand in 1950.

He became an actor by accident when in 1955 he accompanied a colleague to auditions for Nola Millar's production of Richard II with the Thespians company and ended up being cast as Bolingbroke in which he was very well received. He went on to appear as Worthy in Virtue in Danger for the New Zealand Players and Jimmy Porter in Look Back in Anger for Unity Theatre as well as appearing in radio drama and commercials.

In 1964, Eliott was one of the founders of Downstage Theatre in Wellington, and acted in, designed and directed many of the early productions.

He emigrated to Australia in 1968 where, in concurrent productions for the Old Tote Theatre Company in 1969, he played Hamlet in Shakespeare's "Hamlet" and Guildenstern in Tom Stoppard's "Rosencrantz and Guildenstern are Dead" before going on to a fruitful acting career in television and film and as a voice-over artist. In 1974 he had a continuing role as sports reporter Claude Buckley, whose pursuit of Jean Ford (Monica Maughan) was continually thwarted by his own clumsiness, in the Crawford Productions series The Box.

He returned briefly to New Zealand in 1983 to play Colonel Elliot in Utu directed by Geoff Murphy.

Eliott died in Wentworth Falls, New South Wales, on 22 April 2011.

== Filmography ==
=== Film ===
- Shirley Thompson vs. the Aliens (1972) – George Talbot
- Avengers of the Reef (1973) – Kemp
- Journey Among Women (1977) – Doctor Hargreaves
- A Toast to Melba (1980, TV movie)
- On the Run (1983) – Armourer
- Utu (1984) – Col. Elliot
- A Halo for Athuan (1984) – Father Bernard
- Treasure Island (1987)
- The Odyssey (1987) – Capt. Fitzwater
- Great Expectations, the Untold Story (1987) – Capt. Fitzwater
- The Right Hand Man (1987) – Lord Ironminster
- Rob Roy (1987) – Lord Ironminster
- Young Einstein (1988) – Lecturer
- Moulin Rouge! (2001) – Audience Member (uncredited)
- Dr Mermaid and the Abovemarine (2009) – Narrator (voice)
- Auf der Suche nach der Schatzinsel (1998) – Trader Scout / Stevenson

=== Television ===
- The Group (1971) - Moustooch
- Behind the Legend (1972) - Henry Lawson
- The Box (1974)
- Prisoner (1979) – Ken Roberts
- The Last Outlaw (1980. miniseries) – Sergeant Steele
- A Country Practice (1981) – Douglas McKenzie / Roy Roach / Laurie Walker
- Runaway Island (1982, miniseries)
- Sons and Daughters (1982) – Brian Ingleton / Nat Fisher
- The Adventures of Huckleberry Finn (1982) – Richard Casey
- The Dismissal (1983, miniseries) – Sir Fredrick Wheeler
- The Last Bastion (1984, miniseries) – Richard Casey
- Five Mile Creek (1984) – Mr. Sykes
- Winners (1985) – Simon
- Captain James Cook (1988, miniseries) – Earl of Morton
- Joe Wilson (1988, miniseries) – Jack Barnes
- Mission: Impossible (1988) – Horace Selim
- G.P. (1989) – Professor Mick Curnow
- Police Rescue (1991) – Sir Maurice Wells
- Snowy River: The McGregor Saga – Arnold Rule
- Water Rats (1996) – Laurie Parsons
- Murder Call (1997) – Arthur Smith
