= Paul Swadel =

New Zealand film director & producer (1968–2016)

- Born: October 23, 1968; New Zealand
- Died: March 18, 2016 (aged 47); New Zealand

Paul Regan Swadel (23 October 1968 – 18 March 2016) was a New Zealand film director and producer.

== Life and career ==
Swadel nurtured a filmmaking partnership with James Cunningham that spanned fifteen years and four globally successful short films. Their film Infection competed at Cannes International Film Festival 2000, Sundance Film Festival 2001 and twenty other international film festivals. Paul and James developed an indie performance capture driven CGI film Marshal with Mark Ordesky, executive producer of The Lord of the Rings. Their proof of concept short film Poppy, was shot on the Weta Digital motion capture soundstage. Poppy features Matthew Sunderland, winner of Best Actor Award at the 2008 NZ Screen Awards.

Swadel was a co-executive producer of Headstrong with Ant Timpson and Leanne Saunders. Their feature film The Devil Dared Me To had its world premiere at SXSW and screened at over twenty International Film Festivals. It has been sold to Wild Bunch for the United Kingdom, Vivendi for the United States and Boll AG for rest of the world. Their second feature film A Song of Good began its festival run with a World Premiere at Rotterdam Film Festival where it sold out all of its screenings. It garnered 5 nominations at the 2008 New Zealand Screen Awards, and won a Best Picture Award.

He also directed a significant number of award-winning art documentaries around the world. These range in subject from Plácido Domingo at the New York Metropolitan Opera, The Understudy, to an award-winning six-hour series on the history of New Zealand Art, The Big Picture presented by Hamish Keith, which garnered three nominations at the 2008 New Zealand Screen Awards, and won Best Series and Best Music awards.

Swadel died on 18 March 2016, after suffering from early-onset Alzheimer's disease. He was survived by his son Felix, as well as his parents, siblings and other family members.

== Filmography ==
Year	Film	Credited as				Notes
Year	Film	Director	Producer	Exec. producer	Writer	Notes
1989	The Erotic Frigidaire	Yes	No	No	No	Short film
1992	Zerographic	No	Yes	No	No	Short film
1994	A Little Death	Yes	No	No	Yes	Short film Co-directed with Simon Perkins
1996	Supercollider	Yes	Yes	No	No	Short film
1997	Delf	No	Yes	No	No	Short film
1998	Blinder	No	Yes	No	No	Short film
1999	Like An Angel	Yes	Yes	No	Yes	Short film
2000	Accidents	Yes	No	No	No	Short film
2000	Infection	No	Yes	No	No	Short film
2001	Junk	No	No	Yes	No	Short film
2002	Beautiful	No	No	Yes	No	Short film
2002	The French Doors	No	No	Yes	No	Short film
2004	Colin McCahon: I Am	Yes	No	No	No	Documentary
2004	Ride	No	No	Yes	No	Short film
2004	Water	No	No	Yes	No	Short film
2004	No Ordinary Sun	No	No	Yes	No	Short film
2005	The Understudy	Yes	No	No	No	Television film
2007	The Big Picture	Yes	No	No	No	Television series; 1 episode
2007	The Devil Dared Me To	No	No	Yes	No	Film
2008	A Song of Good	No	No	Yes	No	Film
2009	Poppy	No	Yes	No	No	Short film
2010	Where Dad Walked	No	No	No	Yes	Short film
2011	When A City Falls	No	No	Yes	No	Film
2015	Feeder	No	No	Yes	No	Short film
