= Utu (film) =

1983 film by Geoff Murphy

- DVD cover
- Directed by: Geoff Murphy
- Written by: Geoff Murphy; Keith Aberdein
- Produced by: Geoff Murphy
- Starring: Anzac Wallace; Bruno Lawrence; Kelly Johnson; Wi Kuki Kaa; Tim Elliot; Merata Mita; Tania Bristowe; Martyn Sanderson; Ilona Rodgers
- Cinematography: Graeme Cowley
- Edited by: Michael J. Horton
- Music by: John Charles
- Release date: 1983
- Running time: 104 minutes
- Country: New Zealand
- Languages: English; Maori
- Box office: NZ$600,000 (est) (New Zealand)

Utu is a 1983 New Zealand war film about the New Zealand Wars. Co-written and directed by Geoff Murphy, the films stars Anzac Wallace, Bruno Lawrence, Tim Eliott, Ilona Rodgers, Wi Kuki Kaa and Merata Mita, and depicts the story of a Māori warrior who sets out on a quest for "utu" (Te Reo Maori: Payment, Revenge). Inspired by the events of Te Kooti's War, the film is set in 1870 in the North Island and has been described as a New Zealand Western.

The film, which had one of the largest budgets for a New Zealand film when it was produced, screened out of competition at the 1983 Cannes Film Festival, and became the second most successful locally made movie released in New Zealand after being released in theatres. Positive reviews of the film from American critics, include a rave view from Pauline Kael, helped to gain Murphy directing opportunities in Hollywood. In 2013, partially thanks to the longtime existence of an alternative cut of the film aimed at international audiences which Murphy had never been happy with, he completed work on a restored and recut version. Titled Utu Redux, the recut version, premiered at a film festival in Wellington on 26 July 2013.

== Plot ==
In 1870, Te Wheke (Anzac Wallace) is a Māori warrior who collaborates with the colony of New Zealand during the New Zealand Wars. When he comes across a village destroyed by colonial forces, Te Wheke recognises it as his birthplace and deserts the colonialists to wage an insurgency against them instead. After Te Wheke destroys the home of colonial officer Williamson (Bruno Lawrence) and kills his wife Emily, Williamson vows to hunt down Te Wheke and kill him personally. Concomitantly, Māori scout Wiremu (Wi Kuki Kaa) and veteran officer Lieutenant Scott (Kelly Johnson) also attempt to track Te Wheke down, using insurgency weapons and tactics despite the personal disapproval of their superior, Colonel Elliot (Tim Eliott).

== Cast ==
- Anzac Wallace as Te Wheke
- Bruno Lawrence as Williamson
- Tim Eliott as Colonel Elliot
- Kelly Johnson as Lieutenant Scott
- Wi Kuki Kaa as Wiremu
- Tania Bristowe as Kura
- Ilona Rodgers as Emily Williamson
- Merata Mita as Matu
- Faenza Reuben as Hersare
- Tama Poata as Puni
- Martyn Sanderson as Vicar
- John Bach as Belcher
- Dick Puanaki as Eru
- Sean Duffy as Corporal Jones
- Ian Watkin as Doorman
- Betty MacKay as Organist

== Production ==
Utu was one of the largest film productions to have taken place in New Zealand until that point. Its grand scale warranted the use of a large second unit, which again was rare in the context of a young New Zealand cinema industry. Wallace prior to being cast as Te Wheke had some experience acting on television.

Murphy was interested in authenticity, trying to keep it as period-accurate as possible. To accomplish this many of the extras were local Maori and in order for Te Wheke's moko to look realistic, Anzac Wallace would spend 4 hours having it applied each day of shooting.

In a likely New Zealand record, the film amassed a thousand-strong army comprising c.900, mainly school children extras, dressed with masking tape, rolled sacks, cardboard boxes and hats.

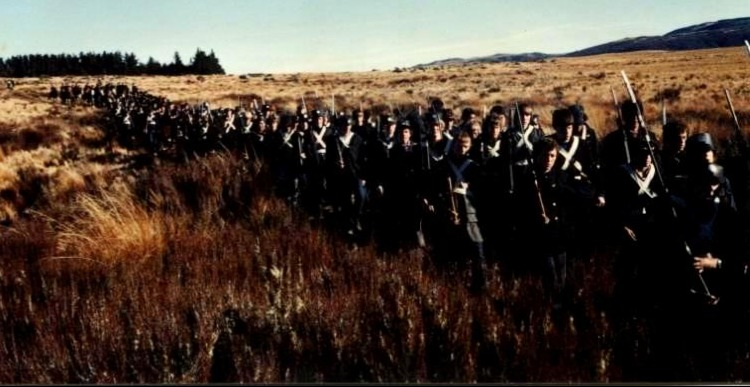
Props Master Barry Thomas dressed UTU extras using masking tape, painted cardboard boxes and sacks - Ngamatea Station.

== Reception ==
The film's immediate reception was less positive than Murphy's earlier works, although still positive. Locally the film was very commercially successful, being New Zealand's second highest-grossing film at the time (behind Murphy's previous effort, Goodbye Pork Pie).

Critically the film had a mixed positive reception. Filmmaker Costa Botes noted that “Utu's shotgun approach to the great New Zealand film ultimately leaves it feeling episodic and tangled". New Yorker film critic Pauline Kael however gave the film an exceptionally positive review, saying that "[Geoff Murphy] seems to be directing with a grin on his face, [...] the ferocity of these skirmishes and raids is played off against an Arcadian beauty that makes your head swim". Similarly Variety said "Murphy has produced powerful images and strong performances".

The film prompted public discussion about New Zealand history. Film academic Roger Horrocks said "Utu was an uneven film but succeeded in stirring up more discussion of New Zealand history than any recent book has done".

In 2014 New Zealanders voted for their top ten favourite kiwi films and Geoff Murphy's Goodbye Pork Pie, Utu and The Quiet Earth took out three places.

Quentin Tarantino in a 2016 interview with Radio New Zealand praised Utu as "hands down the best New Zealand movie of all time".

== Original Score Track listing ==
1. "Theme From Utu"
2. "Drummers"
3. "Patrol"
4. "Destroyed Village"
5. "Te Wheke Stalks Emily"
6. "Moko"
7. "The Raid; After the Raid"
8. "Williamson Retaliates"
9. "Quadruple Barrelled Shotgun; The Army Approaches Te Puna"
10. "Waiata Tangi; Kura and Henare"
11. "Night Sentry"
12. "Fishing; After the Battle"
13. "Williamson Reflects"
14. "Te Wheke's Trek"
15. "Williamson Prepares for Utu"
16. "Death of Te Wheke (lament) and Finale"

The soundtrack was recorded by the New Zealand Symphony Orchestra conducted by Sir William Southgate.

== Accolades ==
Award	Date of ceremony	Category	Recipient	Result	Ref.
Fantasporto International Film Festival	1986	Best Film		Nominated	
Cannes Film Festival	1983	Official Selection		Out of Competition	
New Zealand Music Awards	1983	Soundtrack of the Year		Nominated	
