= Bastion Point: Day 507 =

1978 New Zealand documentary

- Directed by: Merata Mita; Leon Narbey; Gerd Pohlmann
- Release date: 1978
- Running time: 27 minutes
- Country: New Zealand
- Languages: English; Māori

Bastion Point: Day 507 is a 1978 New Zealand documentary by directors Merata Mita, Leon Narbey and Gerd Pohlmann.

== Synopsis ==
Documentary about the eviction using 600 police, on 25 May 1978 after the 506 day occupation of Takaparawhau / Bastion Point by members of the Ngati Whatua tribe led by Joe Hawke.

== Restoration ==
A restored version of the documentary was screened on the 38th anniversary by Ngā Taonga Sound & Vision.
