= Beatscript =

Aid for describing story ideas focused on action

A beatscript or beat-script is a scripting aid used for describing story ideas. It offers a level of detail not afforded by the standard feature-film screenplay format. This makes it especially useful for describing short film, animation and short sequence ideas.

Its structure is focused on action rather than thought. This allows screenwriters to organise their narrative ideas in a concise manner that is conducive to screen presentation. It prevents authors from describing non-tangible, subjective elements that are unable to be effectively represented in screen form.

Beatscripts are used as the starting-point for generating storyboards and shooting-scripts. While beats are used to describe action, shots are used to describe the visual screen presentation of action.

The relationship between individual beats and shots is not direct. In situations, where an event is significant in a sequence, a single beat might equate to a single shot (and is likely to be framed as a close-up). Whereas a series of beats might describe a general idea, these beats might collectively equate to a single shot (which is likely to be framed as a long-shot). The specific visual treatment of beatscript ideas is usually determined by the cinematographer or director (which on small projects is usually the same person).
