= Anzac Wallace =

New Zealand actor and trade union delegate (1945–2019)

Anzac Hohepa Wallace (born Norman Pene Rewiri; 15 September 1945 – 8 April 2019), also known as Zac Wallace, was a New Zealand actor and former trade union delegate. He is best known for his role as Te Wheke in the 1983 New Zealand film Utu.

== Early life ==
Wallace was born on 15 September 1945. He grew up in Mission Bay, Auckland. His iwi affiliation was Ngāpuhi. As a youth, he was involved in petty crime, eventually escalating to armed robbery, for which he spent several years in prison until 1974. During his time in prison, he taught himself to read. He then went to work in earthmoving, working as part of the Auckland Mangere Bridge project.

== Career ==
Despite having minimal acting experience, Wallace was cast in the lead role of Te Wheke in Geoff Murphy's acclaimed 1983 film Utu. In 1985 he appeared in The Silent One, The Quiet Earth and Dangerous Orphans. Shortly afterwards, he departed for Australia, returning to New Zealand in 2013. He appeared in Shortland Street as Rocky Hannah in 2016.

== Death ==
Wallace died on 8 April 2019 from cancer. He was survived by his wife, Deidre Nehua.
