= Merata Mita =

New Zealand filmmaker (1942–2010)

Merata Mita CNZM (19 June 1942 – 31 May 2010) was a New Zealand filmmaker, producer, and writer, and a key figure in the growth of the Māori screen industry. Mita was the first indigenous woman and the first woman in New Zealand to solely write and direct a dramatic feature film Mauri (1988).

== Early life ==
Mita was born on 19 June 1942 in Maketu in New Zealand's Bay of Plenty. She was the third of nine children and had a traditional rural Māori upbringing. She was from the Māori iwi of Ngāti Pikiao and Ngāi Te Rangi.

== Filmmaking career ==
Mita taught at Kawerau College for eight years, where she began using film and video to reach high school students characterised as "unteachable", many of them Māori and Pacific Islander. She learned that the film and video equipment helped her students with their education as it was a form of oral storytelling, where they could express themselves through various art forms, such as drawing and image. This experience led to Mita's interest in filmmaking. She initially started her filmmaking career by working with film crews as a liaison person, with her first documenta. Through these jobs, she discovered that foreign filmmakers had the access to tell the stories of Māori people, where she then decided to become a filmmaker herself. Mita started her technical education by having jobs as a sound assistant and a sound recordist. Over time, people started to take note of her contributions as part of the film crew. The experience eventually led her into a lengthy career in the film and television industry. Later on, she moved to Hawaii in 1990 and taught documentary film making at the University of Hawaiʻi at Mānoa.

In 1987, Mita debuted with her first feature-length film, Mauri (1988). The film presents a sharp contrast with the mainstream production industry at its time. Opposite to the common settler narratives in New Zealand cinema, Mauri spikes a challenge to the state authority to reinforce their historical commitment to bi-culturalism and honor the Treaty of Waitangi. Its title, meaning cycles of life and spiritual connection to the indigenous land, is a bold statement of the Maori identity that reaffirms cultural sovereignty and confronts the white Pakeha audience to learn a new mode of storytelling on screen.

=== Acting ===
Mita played the role of 'Matu' in the New Zealand feature film Utu (1983), which was directed by her husband Geoff Murphy, starred Anzac Wallace, and featured veteran Māori actor Wi Kuki Kaa. She also acted in ]The Protesters, a teleplay written by Rowley Habib.

== Political activism through Maori filmmaking ==
Mita's filmmaking has been classified as "Fourth Cinema," a term that was made by New Zealand filmmaker, Barry Barclay. "Fourth Cinema" is described as indigenous cinema created by indigenous filmmakers for indigenous audiences. From the inception of the New Zealand film industry up until the 1970s, cinematic portrayals of the Maori were almost exclusively crafted by the male Pakeha, or white European New Zealanders. Maori culture was frequently overlooked and reduced to various myths and fantasies that reflected colonial sentiments of desire for subjugation and control. The 1970s marked a turning point in the nation's history, as the treatment of the Maori came under increasing scrutiny. This shift was partly influenced by the emergence of international movements such as the women's liberation movement, anti-racist movements, and LGBT movements. However, it was primarily driven by the large-scale post-war migration of Māori from their rural and coastal ancestral territories into the Pākehā-dominated urban areas. According to Te Ara: The Encyclopedia of New Zealand, proportions of Maori residents in urban areas had a 37% increase from 1945 to 1966. Moving into these new urban areas made it challenging for many Māori to pass on their cultural traditions to the next generation and consequently, many began to lose their roots and felt pressured to integrate into Pākehā society.

This paved the way for the Māori Renaissance, a transformative movement aimed at expressing the Māori perspective on their challenges and preserving their identity and traditions. Author Stephen Turner writes that the hill in Mita's film Mauri (1988) "[...] has filmic agency. I see it as a central figure and actor, and the vehicle for the 'mauri' (the principle or force of life) of the film's title [...] Fourth Cinema is a medium through which things pass, enabling people and place to be recollected and connected in the viewing experience."

Merata Mita made boldly political films throughout her career as a director and producer. In one of her early interviews, she explicitly expressed the close-knit connection between her personal life and political filmmaking.

PL: Most of your films have been about Maori and trade-union struggles, but you don't call yourself a political film-maker ...

MM: Well, it's such a narrow definition. I think any aspect of life is political. As soon as you open your mouth you are in the arena of politics, so I've been brought up knowing that being Maori is political, being a woman is political. I don't want to wear an elitist label that removes me from the people I know, the struggles I'm involved with. The things that I film are things that I'm actively involved with, I'm not the detached observer running around with the camera merely observing things. I film the struggles that I've had experience in first-hand, like the Maori land occupations, anti-apartheid and anti-racist struggles, like being a worker in a factory.

Mita was determined to make films that were about feminist decolonisation and indigenisation. She made films that represented Māori people and their culture, which were specifically made for Māori audiences. These films were made as a way to encourage young Māori and indigenous filmmakers after viewing these films, which portrayed their people authentically. In 1972, she was a co-director with Ramai Te Miha Hayward of To Love A Māori (1972). An accomplished documentary director and producer for more than 25 years, Mita made landmark documentary films such as Bastion Point: Day 507 (1980), about the eviction of Ngāti Whātua from their traditional land. At the time of the protest, Merata's team was the only media permissioned with filming access from the iwi (tribe), making this a significant case for the Māori control of the image. She also made the feature-length documentary Patu! (1983), about the violent clashes between anti-apartheid protesters and the police during the controversial 1981 South African Springboks rugby tours in New Zealand and Hotere (2001) documented the life and work of well-known Māori artist Ralph Hotere. She also directed the music video Waka for hip-hop artist Che Fu.

== Biographic work ==
In 1998, Mita was the subject of a documentary in the television series, Rangatira: Merata Mita – Making Waves, directed by Hinewehi Mohi.

In October 2014, NZ on Air announced funding for a biographical film, Te Taki A Merata Mita – How Mum Decolonised The Screen, to be directed by her son Heperi Mita, for cinematic release and screening on Māori Television. On 28 November 2018, the documentary was accepted into the Sundance Film Festival in their 2019 programme.

== International influence ==
Mita's influence among indigenous filmmakers internationally was considerable, through film organisations and film festivals in which she mentored, such as the Sundance Film Festival's Native Film Initiative, the National Geographic All Roads Indigenous Film Festival, the Corporation for Public Broadcasting's consortium Pacific Islanders in Communications, and through her teaching at the University of Hawaiʻi at Mānoa. In 2016, the Merata Mita Fellowship was created by the Sundance Institute for native or indigenous filmmakers globally at any stage of their career or production.

== Recognition and awards ==
Some of Mita's recognition and awards included the Amiens International Film Festival's "MRAP Award" for her documentary, Patu!, in 1983, Rimini Film Festival's "Best Film" for Mauri in 1989, Flaherty Seminar's "Leo Dratfield Award for Commitment and Excellence in Documentary" in 1996, Taos Film Festival's "Mountain Award for excellence, commitment, and innovation" in 1999, the Te Waka Toi, part of the Creative New Zealand Te Tohu Toi Ke – "Making a difference" Award (2009), and the 2010 New Year Honours, when she was appointed a Companion of the New Zealand Order of Merit for her services to the film industry. Mita was also nominated for Asia Pacific Screen Awards' "Best Children's Feature Film" with Ainsley Gardiner, Cliff Curtis and Emanuel Michael, for the film, Boy, in 2010, and for Aotearoa Film and Television Awards' "Best Director - Television Documentary" for Saving Grace - Te Whakarauora Tangata in 2011. National Geographic All Roads Festival's "Merata Mita Award" is an annual award that recognises a "Legacy of Outstanding Storytelling" was established in Mita's honour in 2010.

== Personal life ==
Mita had seven children: Rafer, Richard, Rhys, Lars, Awatea, Eruera and Hepi. Her fourth son, Lars, died as an infant at the age of 11 months. Her son Hepi Mita from her longtime relationship with Geoff Murphy produced a documentary Merata: How Mum Decolonised the Screen on his mother's cinematic legacy which was released in 2018.

== Death ==
Mita died suddenly on 31 May 2010, after collapsing outside the studios of Māori Television.

== Works ==
Mita directed or collaborated on numerous films and television shows, including:

=== Films ===
- The Hammer and the Anvil (1979) – Co-director, co-producer
- Karanga Hokianga (1979) – Director, co-editor
- Bastion Point: Day 507 (1980) – Co-director, co-editor
- Kinleith '80 (1981) – Community liaison
- Keskidee Aroha (1981) – Co-director, co-producer
- The Bridge: A Story of Men in Dispute (1982) – Co-director, Sound
- Utu (1983) – Role: Matu, Cultural Advisor
- Patu! (1983) – Director, producer
- Mauri (1988) – Director, writer, producer
- Mana Waka (1990) – Director, sound designer, writer
- The Shooting of Dominick Kaiwhata (1993) – Director, Producer
- Dread (1996) – Director, writer
- Te Paho (1997) – Director, writer
- Hotere (2001) – Director, writer, producer
- The Land Has Eyes (2004) – Executive Producer
- Spooked (2004) – Producer, Second Unit Director, Role: Fred’s wife
- Boy (2010) – Co-producer
- Saving Grace - Te Whakarauora Tangata (2011) – Director
- Merata: How Mum Decolonised the Screen (2018) – Subject

=== Television shows ===
- Women - Māori Women in a Pākehā World (Episode Four) (1977) – Subject
- Karanga Hokianga ki o Tamariki (1979) – Director, producer
- Koha (1980-1981) – Director Producer
- Titiro Mai (1980-1985) – Presenter
- One of those Blighters (1982) – Role: Sue
- New Streets - South Auckland, Two Cities (1982) – Research
- Making Utu (1982) – Subject
- Loose Enz - The Protestors – Role: Ru
- New Streets - Auckland Fa’a-Samoa (1982) – Research
- Koha - Mauri (1987) – Subject
- Kaleidoscope - NZ Cinema, the Past Decade (1987) – Subject
- Koha - Nga Pikitia Māori (1987) – Subject
- Solidarity (1992) – Executive Producer
- Witi Ihimaera (1997) – Interviewer, Consultant Producer
- Rangatira: Merata Mita - Making Waves (1998) – Project Advisor, Subject
- The Magnificent Seven (1998) – Second Unit Director
- Frontseat - Series Two, Episode 10 (2006) – Subject
- Kete Aronui - Merata Mita (2007) – Subject
- 50 Years of New Zealand Television: 7 - Taonga TV (2010) – Subject
- 50 Years of New Zealand Television: 2 - The Whole World’s Watching (2010) – Subject
- Taku Rākau e (2010) – Producer
- 50 Years of New Zealand Television: 1 - From One Channel to One Hundred (2010) – Subject
- Hautoa Mā! The Rise of Māori Cinema (2016) – Subject
