= Frank Whitten =

New Zealand TV actor (1942 - 2011)

- Born: Frank Edgar Richard Whitten; 15 November 1942; Te Aroha, New Zealand
- Died: 12 February 2011 (aged 68); New Zealand
- Occupation: Actor
- Years active: 1984–2010
- Spouse: Jana Boková (1970–1979)

Frank Edgar Richard Whitten (15 November 1942 – 12 February 2011) was a New Zealand television actor. He was more recently known for playing Ted "Grandpa" West in the New Zealand television show Outrageous Fortune.

== Early life and education ==
Whitten was born in Te Aroha and grew up in the Waikato region in the 1940s and 50s. Around 1963, "with very little experience and even less money", he left for England to become an actor. He also spent time as an improvisational tutor at leading British drama school the London Academy of Music and Dramatic Art, and by 1970 was the school's vice-principal. Over the next eighteen years, Whitten worked in a children's community theatre company he co-founded called Common Stock, which developed plays with, and for, working-class children.

== Career ==
In 1982 Whitten returned to New Zealand and began acting in theatre. Two years later, he appeared as an exploitative guru of a commune in Trespasses, the movie spin off of police show Mortimer's Patch. The same year, Whitten played the enigmatic farmer who strides into the isolated rural world of a young child in Vigil, the first feature directed by Vincent Ward. In the mid-1980s he joined the serial Heroes, playing roadie to a group of young musicians. He followed this role by playing one of the main roles on historical drama Heart of the High Country, based on the novel by English author Elizabeth Gowans.

Whitten had a role in the short film Accidents, and small roles in the romance Arriving Tuesday, Zilch!, The Returning, and two international thrillers, Chill Factor and Hot Target. In 2003, he appeared in P.J. Hogan's live action remake of Peter Pan.

On television, he made guest appearances on Erebus: The Aftermath, Gloss, The Chosen, Ray Bradbury Theatre and Mysterious Island, and a lead role in the award-winning miniseries The Leaving of Liverpool.

In 2007, his ongoing role on as "Grandpa" Ted West on Outrageous Fortune won him a best supporting actor award at the New Zealand Screen Awards.

For twelve years, he played the older man in the Speight's "Southern Man" series of television commercials, well known for his character's catchphrase, "Good on ya, mate!"

== Theatre ==
Whitten penned the stage drama Trifecta.

== Death ==
Whitten died on 12 February 2011, aged 68. The official media statement stated that "[he] died peacefully in his sleep" following a short battle with cancer.

== Filmography ==
=== Film ===
Year	Title	Role	Notes
1984	Vigil	Ethan Ruir	
1984	Trespasses	Stan Gubbins	
1985	Hot Target	Apartment owner	
1986	Arriving Tuesday	Farmer	
1988	The Clean Machine	Premier John Morgan	TV movie
1989	Zilch!	Engineer	
1989	Chill Factor	Frank Robertson	
1990	The Shrimp on the Barbie	Blue	
1991	The Returning	Mr. Spiggs	
1991	Ring of Scorpio	John Walker	Drama, TV movie
1991	Waiting	Michael	
1992	Greenkeeping	Dad	
1994	The Roly Poly Man	Dr. Henderson	Comedy
1995	Napoleon	Koala	Voice
1995	Dad and Dave: On Our Selection	The Swagman	
1997	Doing Time for Patsy Cline	Watson	
1997	The Ripper	Dr. Pearce	Thriller, TV movie
1998	The Chosen	Eddie O'Connor	Drama, TV movie
1999	Me Myself I	Charlie	
1999	Airtight	Escher	Action / Drama / Romance / Sci-Fi / Thriller, TV movie
2001	The Man Who Sued God	Primate	
2003	Peter Pan	Starkey	
2004	Floodhouse	Manaroan in Aviator Hat	
2005	Hell Has Harbour Views	Giles Taffy QC	Drama / Comedy, TV movie

=== Television ===
Year	Title	Role	Notes
1984	Heroes	Leslie	Series regular, 9 episodes
1985	Hanlon	Charles Clements	
1985	Heart of the High Country	Reg Bowen	Main role
1986	Open House	Tony Van Der Berg	"Happy Birthday" (S01E01)
1989	The Brotherhood of the Rose	unknown	Miniseries
1989	The Shadow Trader	Kevin McCarthy	Episode 1
1990	The New Adventures of Black Beauty	Gilbert de Mauria	"Deceptive Appearances" (S01E05)
1990	The Ray Bradbury Theater	Mr. Cooger	"The Black Ferris" (S04E04)
1992	The Leaving of Liverpool	Brother Jerome	unknown
1992	The Ray Bradbury Theater	Odd Martin	"The Dead Man" (S06E07)
1992	The Ray Bradbury Theater	Mailman	"Great Wide World Over There" (S06E14)
1993	Phoenix	Stan Cutler	"In on the Joke" (S02E08)
1993	Police Rescue	Glasel	"Speeding" (S03E08)
1993-1994	Secrets	Tom Jacobs	Main role
1995	Heartbreak High	Bob	Season 2, Episode 5
1995	Mysterious Island	Ayrton	Main role
1996	Naked: Stories of Men	Father Dunfree	"Coral Island" (S01E01)
1996	Sun on the Stubble	Pastor	Miniseries, unknown episodes
1996	City Life	Carl Jones	Season 1, Episodes 7 & 8
1997	Murder Call	Blackie	"Heartstopper" (S01E16)
1998	Good Guys, Bad Guys	Beau Kinsella	"100% Proof" (S02E09)
1999	All Saints	Ken Burns	"If These Walls Could Talk" (S02E05)
2001	Changi	Dr. Potter	"Private Bill" (S01E03)
2003	All Saints	Albert Tolz	"Destiny's Child" (S06E03)
2004	All Saints	Joe McLean	"When Worlds Collide" (S07E24)
2004	Love My Way	Kel	"Stick Sisters" (S01E05)
2005-2010	Outrageous Fortune	Ted West	Main role, (final appearance)
