= Jane Weinstock =

Film director and writer

Jane Weinstock is an American film director and writer. Her films have been shown at the Toronto International Film Festival, the Venice Film Festival, the Sundance Film Festival the Berlin International Film Festival, and the Tribeca Film Festival. Her writings have been published in Art in America, Camera Obscura, m/f and October.

== Education ==
Weinstock graduated from Princeton University and attended graduate programs at the Paris Film Program and the Slade School of Fine Art in London. She received a masters from NYU in Cinema Studies.

== Career ==
=== Art and film writing ===
Before Weinstock became a filmmaker, she was an academic, who taught at NYU, UCLA, and CalArts. She regularly published writing on film theory through lenses of feminism and psychoanalysis in academic journals such as Camera Obscura, Screen, m/f, and October. She continues to publish art writing, and has written on the artists Suzanne Bocanegra, Jeff Wall, Barbara Kruger, John Cassavetes, Sally Potter, Martha Rosler, Anthony McCall and Andrew Tyndall, Barbara Bloom, Mary Kelly, and Christian Boltanski.

=== Film ===
Weinstock has written and directed two feature length films. The first, Easy, centers around a woman, played by Marguerite Moreau, and her romantic life. "I wanted to make a movie about relationships, about women who didn't have very good ones." Released in 2003, Easy was shown at Sundance and Toronto and was reviewed in the New York times and the Los Angeles Times.

Weinstock's second feature film, a psychological thriller, The Moment, was released in 2013, starring Jennifer Jason Leigh, Martin Henderson, Alia Shawkat, Mariane Jean-Baptiste and Meatloaf. The Moment premiered at the Tribeca Film Festival.

Earlier in her career, while working towards a PhD in film studies and psychoanalytic theory that she did not finish, Weinstock co-wrote and co-directed a short film, Sigmund Freud's Dora, with Anthony McCall, Claire Pajaczkowska, Andrew Tyndall and Ivan Ward. The film screened at the Berlin International Film Festival, the Whitney Museum, the Collective for Living Cinema and the Whitechapel Gallery. Weinstock had a change of heart and pivoted her career towards actually making films. Weinstock went on to make Voices of Silence for German television. She then made The Clean Up, which played at the Sundance Film Festival, the Toronto International Film Festival, and the Venice Film Festival.

She served as film and video curator for an exhibition entitled, Difference: On Representation and Sexuality, at the New Museum in New York in 1984-85 and at the Institute of Contemporary Arts in London.

== Personal life ==
Weinstock lives in New York City with her husband, artist James Welling.

== Bibliography ==
- Screening Memories. (Essay on the work of Suzanne Bocanegra) published in October issue 176. 2021.
- A Phantom Thread. (Essay on the work of Jeff Wall, Co-written with James Welling) published in Jeff Wall: The George Economou Collection. 2020.
- Amor Nel Cor. (Co-written with Barbara Bloom) Published in Fetishism as Cultural Discourse, edited by Emily Apter and William Pietz, Cornell University Press. 1993.
- 5 Minutes to Alexander Platz. Published in Camera Obscura 27. 1991.
- Outtakes from Berlin. Published in Art in America. 1990.
- Out of Her Mind. Published in Camera Obscura 19. 1989.
- Silvia Kolbowski in Discussion with Jane Weinstock. Published in m/f. 1986.
- Sexual Difference and the Moving Image. Published in the catalogue for the exhibition Difference: On Representation and Sexuality. 1985.
- A Post-Post Partum Document. (Essay on the work of Mary Kelly) Published in Camera Obscura. 1985
- What She Means to You. (Essay on the work of Barbara Kruger) Published in We Won't Play Nature to Your Culture. 1983.
- A Lass, A Laugh and a Lad. Published in Art in America. Summer 1983.
- Interview with Martha Rosler. Published in October issue 17. 1981.
- Sigmund Freud's Dora?. Published in Screen vol 22, no 2. 1981.
- New French Feminisms. (with Rosi Braidotti) Published in Camera Obscura. 1981.
- She Who Laughs First Laughs Last. (Essay on the work of Sally Potter) Published in Camera Obscura 5. 1980.
- The Subject of Argument. (on the work of Anthony McCall and Andrew Tyndall) Published in Downtown Review. 1979.
- Weinstock co-edited a collection of Craig Owens' writings, Beyond Recognition: Representation, Power, and Culture, published in 1994, with Scott Bryson, Barbara Kruger, and Lynne Tillman.
