= Grey's Anatomy season 14 =

Grey's Anatomy
- Season 14
- DVD cover art for the fourteenth season of Grey's Anatomy
- Showrunners: Krista Vernoff; Shonda Rhimes
- Starring: Ellen Pompeo; Justin Chambers; Chandra Wilson; James Pickens Jr.; Kevin McKidd; Jessica Capshaw; Sarah Drew; Jesse Williams; Caterina Scorsone; Camilla Luddington; Kelly McCreary; Jason George; Martin Henderson; Giacomo Gianniotti
- No. of episodes: 24

Release
- Original network: ABC
- Original release: September 28, 2017 – May 17, 2018

Season chronology
- ← Previous; Season 13 Next → Season 15

The fourteenth season of the American television medical drama Grey's Anatomy was ordered on February 10, 2017, by American Broadcasting Company (ABC), and premiered on September 28, 2017 with a special 2-hour premiere. The season consists of 24 episodes, with the season's seventh episode marking the 300th episode for the series overall. The season is produced by ABC Studios, in association with Shondaland Production Company and Entertainment One Television.

Krista Vernoff who helped co-lead the show with Shonda Rhimes in its early years, marked her return as co-showrunner this season with William Harper, having previously left at the end of the seventh season. Rhimes left ABC to produce television for Netflix, and now has a hands-off approach to the show. Despite not being showrunner since its eighth season to run Scandal, Rhimes still signed off each episode's storyline, but this season marked a departure from this. Rhimes explained she only trusted Vernoff to pursue uncharted territory without her. As such, drastic creative changes occurred in the season, with Vernoff retiring Martin Henderson, Jessica Capshaw, and Sarah Drew's characters. Jason George also departs as Ben Warren to appear in the second spin-off, Station 19. He would continue to make recurring appearances in the series until season 21 when he was again given starring status.

On April 20, 2018, ABC officially renewed Grey's Anatomy for a network primetime drama record-tying fifteenth season.

The website Screen Rant ranked the season #13 on their 2023 ranking of the 19 Grey's Anatomy seasons.

== Episodes ==
The number in the "No. overall" column refers to the episode's number within the overall series, whereas the number in the "No. in season" column refers to the episode's number within this particular season. "U.S. viewers in millions" refers to the number of Americans in millions who watched the episodes live. Each episode of this season is named after a song.

No. overall	No. in season	Title	Directed by	Written by	Original release date	Prod. code	U.S. viewers (millions)
294	1	"Break Down the House"	Debbie Allen	Krista Vernoff	September 28, 2017	1401	8.07
In a whirlwind of reunions and a Grey Sloan "major uplift", Meredith finds herself in a complicated love triangle between Nathan and Megan, Owen's sister who was recently revealed to still be alive after a ten year absence in a hostage camp overseas. With Megan's reappearance, Teddy Altman comes back to Seattle to support Owen and his mom, which leads to awkward interactions with Amelia. With Stephanie now in Texas at a burn unit, Jo eagerly tries to make Ben her new person. After being "ghosted" by Eliza, Arizona hits it off with an Italian girl in a bar whom she takes home with her. When Andrew comes home, he finds his sister half-naked on his couch with Arizona.
295	2	"Get Off on the Pain"	Kevin McKidd	Krista Vernoff	September 28, 2017	1402	8.07
Carina, Andrew's sister, asks to be introduced to Bailey in order to get approval to study the controversial topic of female masturbation and orgasms at her hospital; Bailey obliges due to society's double standard. Meredith works to get everyone to agree that an abdominal wall transplant is the best tactic to treat Megan's wounds; she even gets Teddy to scrub in to erase any doubts of Meredith's intentions of being Megan's surgeon. Jo tries to mend her relationship with Alex. Later, it is revealed that Jo slept with one of the new sub-interns. Owen gets called out on his marital status with Amelia, who seems to be avoiding him and his family. Even without the support of Jackson, Amelia fights to remove a patient's mastoid tumor. She later takes part in Carina's study which leads to her finding a huge tumor in her own brain.
296	3	"Go Big or Go Home"	Chandra Wilson	Meg Marinis	October 5, 2017	1403	8.06
Amelia brings in one of her former professors and current head of Neurology at Johns Hopkins, Dr. Tom Koracick to help her come up with a treatment plan for her tumor. Much to her chagrin, Dr Koracick brings to light how impaired her judgment has been over the last ten years; Richard makes sure to let Amelia know that her judgment has not been all that bad and encourages her to come clean to those with whom she is closest. Bailey is confronted by Dr. Harper from the Harper Avery Foundation about all the changes that have been made to the hospital and Harper threatens to withdraw all funding from the foundation; when Bailey stands up to him, Harper fires her. In the end of the episode Harper passes away with a sudden cardiac arrest and then Jackson and Catherine Avery reinstate Bailey back as the chief. Ben and Arizona resort to advice delivered by Carina when one of their patients gets stuck in labor. Meredith turns to her former psychiatrist, who winds up as a patient, to sort out her mood towards everyone instigated by the love triangle involving Nathan and Megan. Jo asks Alex to move back home.
297	4	"Ain't That a Kick in the Head?"	Geary McLeod	Marlana Hope	October 12, 2017	1404	8.08
Amelia has her brain tumor removed, but in the days following, she experiences some complications, such as speaking only French, and memory loss. Richard unexpectedly brings Maggie to attend a family dinner hosted by Catherine, which turns awkward when Catherine discloses to Jackson his inheritance from Harper's passing, a quarter billion dollars. Bailey and Richard host interviews with prospective new interns but fail to find a decent candidate. Using her research to justify his entry into the country, Meredith and Nathan team up to bring Megan's adopted son to America. Amelia and Owen face their fear that their marriage is based on a version of Amelia created by her tumor. Arizona learns that Sofia wants to move home. Jo confesses that she hates how much control her ex-husband has over her.
298	5	"Danger Zone"	Cecilie Mosli	Jalysa Conway	October 26, 2017	1405	7.67
As Owen helps Megan make the trip to California where she will start her new life with Nathan and her son, Farouk, they reminisce on their time spent in Fallujah, Iraq. During their time overseas, Nathan proposed to Megan by recycling a necklace that was not initially intended for her. Teddy quickly recognized the necklace and the fact that Nathan cheated and pushed him to come clean. Despite the good news of the engagement, Megan dealt with heartbreak of not making strat, which is later revealed to her as Owen's own doing. Distraught over her brother's betrayal, she gets on a helicopter with one of the shooters who attacked their troops, leading to her disappearance. While Nathan awaits the arrival of Megan and Owen, he bonds with Farouk, who is having trouble acclimating to the free world. He also officially ends his relationship with Meredith, as does Owen with Amelia when he comes to terms with the notion that neither of them are truly happy. Absent: Justin Chambers as Dr. Alex Karev, Chandra Wilson as Dr. Miranda Bailey, James Pickens, Jr. as Dr. Richard Webber, Jessica Capshaw as Dr. Arizona Robbins, Sarah Drew as Dr. April Kepner, Jesse Williams as Dr. Jackson Avery, Camilla Luddington as Dr. Jo Wilson, Kelly McCreary as Dr. Maggie Pierce, Jason George as Dr. Ben Warren and Giacomo Gianniotti as Dr. Andrew DeLuca
299	6	"Come on Down to My Boat, Baby"	Lisa Leone	Kiley Donovan	November 2, 2017	1406	7.38
As the new surgeon on the cover page of the medical journal, JSA, Meredith performs a rare surgical procedure to try and save a judge from his progressive cancer diagnosis. The men of Grey Sloan take a "sick day" and hang out on a Jackson's newly purchased boat, whereas the women swipe for dates on Tinder. Arizona has broken up with Carina in preparation of Sofia moving back home. Amelia heads back to surgery but struggles with her confidence, recruiting the help of Dr. Koracick and seeking the encouragement of Richard. While Arizona and April repair a woman's injuries caused by an accidental firing of a gun that was hidden inside her vagina, Bailey and Maggie take care of a hypochondriac who was a victim of the accidental shooting. At the surgeon-intern mixer, Meredith learns that she has been nominated for the annual Harper Avery award; however, the news is overshadowed by the loss of her patient. Jackson gives half of his inheritance to Bailey to fund a research competition. Jo learns she is in the running for chief resident and decides to file for divorce from Paul after confiding her situation to the judge. Andrew recognizes one of the new interns from his past, while Owen and Carina are caught kissing.
300	7	"Who Lives, Who Dies, Who Tells Your Story"	Debbie Allen	Krista Vernoff	November 9, 2017	1407	8.13
When a roller coaster car derails off its tracks, Meredith's plans to attend the Harper Avery award ceremony are put on hold. Three patients visiting the ER look like former doctors of the hospital: Drs. Cristina Yang, George O'Malley, and Izzie Stevens. Amelia and Owen learn to co-exist in the OR, after Amelia orders a surprise CT which shows a large hematoma that she is able to repair. As Arizona performs surgery on Liza, Izzie's look-a-like, she reflects on her relationship with Callie and Mark in preparation for Sofia's return to Seattle. Jo probes Alex to call Izzie and see how she is, to which Alex says he knows how she is: a happily married surgeon with three children. Though Jo quickly infers this is how Alex imagines her to be, and wants it to stay that way, rather than wonder how she really is. As they wait on Meredith to leave for Boston, Maggie bonds with Zola as they rehearse medical knowledge and talk about Derek. Bailey and Ben fight over his announcement to join the fire department, due to Bailey's fear that he has commitment issues. Unable to fly out to Boston, in an OR—in front of her friends and colleagues—Meredith is announced the winner of the 2017 Harper Avery award.
301	8	"Out of Nowhere"	Kevin McKidd	William Harper	November 16, 2017	1408	7.52
As the interns struggle to find their stride as surgeons, Jo begins her reign as chief resident. Things take a turn for the worse when the computer system gets hacked at Grey Sloan Memorial, as all of the patients' records get held hostage for $20 million. Unable to understand why the ransom is so large and unprecedented, Bailey realizes it is due to the recently announced competition funded by Jackson's inheritance. Without the use of the technological advancements to which the doctors have become accustomed, they must rely on their instincts to treat their patients; Richard teaches his younger colleagues about how they worked in the "Stone Age". One patient is transported to another hospital by a helicopter which encounters bad turbulence, causing a line to loosen and squirt blood everywhere. Jo gets the scariest surprise of her life when she runs into her abusive husband, Paul, on her way to stop Alex from inadvertently killing their patient.
302	9	"1-800-799-7233" "Four Seasons in One Day"	Bill D'Elia	Andy Reaser	January 18, 2018	1409	8.27
While the staff of the hospital fawns over Dr. Paul Stadler and his legendary work as a surgeon, Jo tries to steer clear of him. Alex and Meredith team up to do their best to protect Jo during the process of filing for divorce. Drenched in blood, Jackson and Maggie save their patient's life and then bond in the locker room after showers; April and Owen use their trauma skills to work on patients in less than ideal and extremely hot conditions, very similar to when they were overseas. Bailey works with an exceptionally computer-savvy intern to take back the power against those who hacked the hospital; this intern later outs himself as "a proud trans man". After Paul's fiancée, Jenny, tells him about her secret exchange with Jo, Meredith pretends to call in security to remove Paul from the hospital. However, he soon winds back up in the ER as a victim of a hit-and-run. This episode was followed by a PSA of Camilla Luddington reminding viewers that psychological abuse is a form of domestic violence and providing the number of the National Domestic Violence Hotline: 1-800-799-7233, the episode's title.
303	10	"Personal Jesus"	Kevin Sullivan	Zoanne Clack	January 25, 2018	1410	8.62
With Paul recovering from surgery, Meredith questions Alex and Jo's alibi. Believing that it is his fiancée, Jenny, who ran him over, Jo feels the need to consult her. April's patient turns out to be the pregnant wife of her ex-fiancé, Matthew, proving to be more than an awkward situation, as she helps deliver their baby, and then watches him deal with his wife's unexpected death. Jackson, Bailey, and April are confronted with racial profiling when police show up with a handcuffed 12-year-old boy whom they shot when he was seen trying to enter his own home through a window. Police officers continue to treat him like a criminal in the ER, prompting Bailey and Ben to give Tucker "the talk". When Jo and Jenny go to Paul's room to announce they are taking him to court, he gets in a bout of rage, falls out of his bed, and knocks himself out becoming brain dead. Still legally his wife, Jo decides to take him off life support and have his organs donated. April ends up in the shower with Vikram, an intern, after she finds herself questioning her faith.
304	11	"(Don't Fear) the Reaper"	Nicole Rubio	Elisabeth R. Finch	February 1, 2018	1412	8.93
With her intuition and the more subtle signs of a heart attack, Bailey winds up in the ER at Seattle Presbyterian; however, after her doctors treat her condescendingly, assuming she is imagining the heart attack and really just suffering from her OCD, she calls on Maggie to come save her. When Maggie arrives, she runs into Richard who found his way there based on Bailey's record of attendance. With her life flashing before her eyes, Bailey reflects on her upbringing and her past as a surgeon with all the stressful fights and struggles she has gone through to get to this point in her life. Right before she goes under for emergency surgery to save her life, Bailey asks Maggie to call Ben who is able to get there before she wakes up. Ben announces that he has quit being a firefighter, but Bailey demands that he go back and never do anything other than what he truly loves.
305	12	"Harder, Better, Faster, Stronger"	Jeannot Szwarc	Kiley Donovan	February 8, 2018	1411	7.32
As the contest draws near, a competitive edge and tension arise between the doctors and their selected interns vying for millions of dollars. In preparation to surprise Catherine on her birthday, Richard takes salsa dancing lessons with Maggie, who is struggling with the one year anniversary of her mother's death. Amelia and Alex tag team a pediatric case, in order to save their patient's ability to sing, as well as retain all mental capabilities. Meredith gets a visit from an old splenectomy patient, who is back with multiple miniature spleens, which guides Meredith to her idea for the competition, and Jackson gets pulled into his mother's gender confirmation proposal, despite his wishes.
306	13	"You Really Got a Hold on Me"	Nzingha Stewart	Stacy McKee	March 1, 2018	1413	7.52
A house fire brings two young boys, who were rescued by the Seattle Grace fire department—Station 19, to the ER. Meredith meets Andy Herrera, a firefighter, who has her hand inside the patient, clamping his abdominal aorta. While Andy gets a front row seat to view the action inside the OR, Ben struggles with the idea of not being a surgeon anymore. Dr. Tom Koracick, Amelia's former professor, shows up to help her with her research project, but quickly shoots down her ideas. However, when they confront each other about their difference in opinion, they come up with an idea to save her patient. Richard watches Bailey very closely, as it is her first day back after recovering from her heart attack. Jackson begins to worry about April and the fact that the interns have nicknamed her "the Party".
307	14	"Games People Play"	Chandra Wilson	Jason Ganzel & Julie Wong	March 8, 2018	1414	7.07
As Maggie's budding romance with Clive gets more serious, Amelia suggests hosting a game night so they can secretly judge him. Meredith prepares to meet the owner of the patent she is pursuing; however, she is surprised to find out that it is an old "friend" of Ellis'. When Marie turns down the opportunity to hand over the patent, Meredith resorts to showing her the device has already been implemented and works. The legal team is brought in after April forgets to file a report when she accidentally severs a patient's ear, which falls to the floor and causes DeLuca to slip and fall, resulting in a concussion. Alex requests permission to use medicinal marijuana on his underage patient, but when her grandma learns of his treatment plan, she temporarily fires him. The game night takes a turn when April has an inebriated breakdown and an unexpected guest shows up—Clive's wife. Calling off the relationship, Jackson sees his opportunity and makes his move on Maggie. Richard reveals to Meredith that Marie and Ellis had a falling out, which leads Meredith to the conclusion that she has been played.
308	15	"Old Scars, Future Hearts"	Ellen Pompeo	Tameson Duffy	March 15, 2018	1415	7.18
Alex, Jo, and Maggie reflect on their first loves as they prepare their teenage patient for heart surgery; however, when a heart transplant becomes available, he denies it until his boyfriend breaks up with him. Marie tells Meredith that her friendship with Ellis ended when Ellis left her name off her Harper Avery award winning research. Marie gives Meredith the ultimatum that for her to get the patent, she must make a statement that the Grey Method is now the Grey-Cerone Method. After a night spent together, April confesses to Tom that her deviant behavior is a result of her failing faith and hatred of God. Maggie and Jackson learn to move past their quirks and baggage. Alex fears that Jo's fellowship applications indicate that she is willing to leave him behind in Seattle; however, in a twist of events, Jo asks Alex to marry her and he quickly accepts.
309	16	"Caught Somewhere in Time"	Nicole Rubio	Jalysa Conway	March 22, 2018	1416	7.61
Bailey's patient turns out to be one of her childhood heroes, a female astronaut who is in the process of building a time machine. Meredith throws in the towel on her research, since she is no longer receiving the patent. Richard and Catherine learn of Jackson and Maggie's relationship, which causes some awkward tension as Jackson, Catherine, and Richard work together on the vaginoplasty case. April hijacks the trauma certification drill, and leaves the interns in tears and doubt. After Bailey loses her patient, she finds the inspiration needed to name her research project "The Trailblazer", and Jo reignites Meredith’s will to continue on with her project. Amelia and Owen continue to pursue their "friends with benefits" relationship until she finds out how close Owen and Teddy are, and Arizona helps Sofia get accustomed to her new life away from New York.
310	17	"One Day Like This"	Kevin McKidd	Elisabeth R. Finch	March 29, 2018	1417	7.15
April crosses Bailey when she disagrees on Bailey's treatment plan for a rabbi who came in three times for diverticulitis and only gave him antibiotics, and who is now suffering from toxic epidermal necrolysis as a side effect. As April treats the rabbi, he gives her a lesson on faith which allows her to reflect on her recent struggles. Meredith buddies up with a new transplant surgeon from the Mayo Clinic, Dr Nick Marsh, who is recovering from a recent kidney transplant of his own. After his lab results come back, Meredith rushes him to surgery to remove a blood clot and successfully saves his kidney. After calling it quits with Amelia, Owen reconnects with Teddy, who now lives in Germany. However, after the short, happy reunion, Teddy learns that just a short while ago he was still sleeping with Amelia and refuses to be his second choice.
311	18	"Hold Back the River"	Geary McLeod	Alex Manugian	April 5, 2018	1418	6.84
Richard is surprised to see his AA sponsor, Ollie, arrive at Grey Sloan in an ambulance. After she denies him the ability to save her life once more, he enlists the help of Maggie and Meredith. Now that Owen is back in the States, he has to face the disdain of Arizona and Amelia's failure to fix things with Teddy. In between the personal conversations, Arizona and Owen look further into a fraudulent oncologist. In their pursuit, they coincidentally learn that Arizona has breast cancer—at least until it was proven that the image produced was a fake. Alex, Amelia, and Tom resect Noah’s brain tumor, despite never performing the procedure before. Though successful, Amelia and Tom decide that it is too risky to do the same for Kimmy, which infuriates Alex. April strives to make amends with her colleagues, and Jackson, claiming that she has found Jesus again. Meredith and Jo learn that their research can be successful without the polymer, and that they can help patients grow livers and save lives.
312	19	"Beautiful Dreamer"	Jeannot Szwarc	Meg Marinis	April 12, 2018	1419	6.97
Bailey gets caught off guard when an agent from ICE (Immigration and Customs Enforcement) shows up looking for one of her surgical interns, Sam Bello. Unaware of the situation, Sam explains that she is a "dreamer" protected by DACA. While Meredith and Andrew scheme up ideas to keep Sam from being deported back to El Salvador, Bailey distracts Agent Fields with concerns about his own health. As Arizona and Carina move forward in their research by learning from their previous patient's death, April is surprised to see Matthew back at Grey Sloan with his baby who is failing to thrive. When Alex refuses to give up on Kimmy, Jo realizes Kimmy's dream and signs off on discharge papers. Catherine comes back to support Richard who has stayed with Ollie right through her final breath. Meredith sends Sam to Zurich to study under Cristina; Owen signs up to become a foster parent, and Jackson confronts Maggie about her tendency to resist their relationship. Jackson directs the Harper Avery Foundation to release a researcher from an agreement so she can collaborate with Amelia; Catherine tells Richard that the hospital is now doomed.
313	20	"Judgment Day"	Sydney Freeland	Julie Wong	April 19, 2018	1420	6.93
As the next stage of the research contest begins, the Top 25 proposals are presented by their respective owners who have gathered to present in front of a panel and audience. Arizona shares cookies, provided by a grateful patient, with her colleagues. However, she later learns they were laced with cannabis. Due to the mishap, the presentations are postponed, and the interns are summoned to replace the stoned attendings. Meredith walks Jo through surgery after Bailey is forced to scrub out and accidentally injures Meredith's hand. Jo makes effective use of Richard's project. Catherine tells Jackson of the 13 sexual harassment cases filed against his grandfather and the major settlements used to cover them up. April overhears and then shares the secret with Bailey, who has a secret of her own—she is partnering with a sex toy company to make her "Trailblazer" device. Owen gets a call about his first foster child, which makes him nervous until Amelia saves him. Meredith learns about the dark past of Harper Avery and, in addition, Marie Cerone was one of the 13 women. Richard fires intern, Dr Vikram Roy, who was found practicing under the influence.
314	21	"Bad Reputation"	Kevin McKidd	Mark Driscoll	April 26, 2018	1421	6.54
With word spreading about Harper Avery, Meredith decides to return her and Ellis' awards to the foundation. Catherine hires a crisis management specialist, who brings in a patient for Jackson and Meredith to heal as PR stunt. Bailey shuts down the innovation contest for fear of word getting out that an Avery funded it, so April volunteers her time to plan Alex and Jo’s wedding. Alex and Jo get awkward when, Olivia, the former “Syph nurse,” returns to the hospital with her son—who swallowed a whistle—and begins planting seeds of doubt. Owen takes Leo in for his check up with his birth mom in tow, who ends up talking to Amelia. Thinking she can sponsor her with her drug addiction, Amelia takes her in as a foster child of her own. Meredith and Jackson think up a way to save the foundation by changing its name to the Catherine Fox Foundation dedicated to all the women victimized by the previous regime. Alex learns that his bank account balance is awfully high due to his mom not cashing the checks he has been sending her, and Vikram plans to sue the hospital for wrongful termination.
315	22	"Fight for Your Mind"	Jesse Williams	Andy Reaser	May 3, 2018	1422	6.66
Alex and Jo drive to Iowa to locate his mom, only to find that she no longer exhibits schizophrenic behavior and she has even returned to her old job. Richard and Bailey battle to keep the hospital from being sued by Vikram. Although Bailey stands by the initial firing, Richard empathizes as he reflects on the times he operated while inebriated. As Amelia helps Betty detox, Arizona struggles to accept that Sofia stole money. Meredith kills time before her presentation throwing darts with a guy she eventually learns is a surgeon who is there to see her. Their conversation leads Meredith to decide that the “Grey Method” should be renamed the “Grey-Cerone Method.” After Alex works things out with his mom, Jo extends a declined invitation to their wedding. Bailey allows Vikram to return under strict probationary rules. Amelia visits an AA group after Betty makes an escape, and Arizona calls Callie to say that she thinks it is time for her and Sofia to move to New York.
316	23	"Cold as Ice"	Bill D'Elia	William Harper	May 10, 2018	1423	7.35
After Arizona tells Bailey of her upcoming departure, she and Amelia consult with a familiar patient, Dr Nicole Herman. Her arrival presents an opportunity that changes Arizona’s future plans-the chance to partner with her and create the Robbins-Herman Center for Women’s Health. When Matthew winds up in the ER after rolling his car and mentions being with April, the doctors fear the worst. Frantically trying to locate April, Owen finds her unconscious in a nearby ravine. Unknowing of the latest events, Alex and Jo work to finalize the details of their impending wedding. Maggie thinks she detects a subtle rhythm on April’s monitor, but she has to repeatedly shock her to strengthen it. While waiting for her to wake up, Arizona breaks the news that Matthew and April have been seeing each other for months and that they were in love. Thinking that the end has come, Jackson finally prays to God and begs Him to save her in exchange for his belief. However, April awakens fully functional despite the disbelief of all her coworkers.
317	24	"All of Me"	Debbie Allen	Krista Vernoff	May 17, 2018	1424	7.60
Alex and Jo’s wedding day has arrived. Though most details have come together, April (who quit the hospital and is now doing medical work with the homeless) panics when multiple guests go to the wrong ceremony. While trying to escape, the mother of the bride faints, keeping Ben and Bailey behind. Once at the hospital, Bailey struggles to find an available cardio surgeon until Teddy unexpectedly arrives looking for a job. Jo learns she has been accepted into Mass Gen’s fellowship program, but fearful of losing Alex. Meredith offers Jo the general surgery attending position. As guests arrive, Alex and Jo accidentally lock themselves in a shed after engaging in one last fling before tying the knot. The wedding is delayed when the wedding planner goes into anaphylactic shock and an emergency tracheotomy is performed to save her. After the guests leave thinking there will be no wedding, the pastor finally arrives in time to marry April and Matthew after a surprise re-engagement. On a ferry back to the main land, Maggie has the idea to have Meredith ordained online to officiate the wedding right there on the ferry. Bailey, wanting to take a break from being chief to focus on her passions, offers Teddy the chance to be interim chief. Watching the wedding happening at the hospital on a tablet, in the ICU with the bride’s mother, Teddy reveals she is pregnant. Arizona says her sad goodbyes before heading to New York, but is giddy to be closer to Callie who is recently single.

== Cast and characters ==
=== Main ===
- Ellen Pompeo as Dr. Meredith Grey
- Justin Chambers as Dr. Alex Karev
- Chandra Wilson as Dr. Miranda Bailey
- James Pickens Jr. as Dr. Richard Webber
- Kevin McKidd as Dr. Owen Hunt
- Jessica Capshaw as Dr. Arizona Robbins
- Sarah Drew as Dr. April Kepner
- Jesse Williams as Dr. Jackson Avery
- Caterina Scorsone as Dr. Amelia Shepherd
- Camilla Luddington as Dr. Jo Wilson
- Kelly McCreary as Dr. Maggie Pierce
- Jason George as Dr. Ben Warren
- Martin Henderson as Dr. Nathan Riggs
- Giacomo Gianniotti as Dr. Andrew DeLuca

=== Recurring ===
- Kim Raver as Dr. Teddy Altman
- Greg Germann as Dr. Tom Koracick
- Jake Borelli as Dr. Levi Schmitt
- Debbie Allen as Dr. Catherine Avery / Catherine Fox
- Abigail Spencer as Dr. Megan Hunt
- Matthew Morrison as Dr. Paul Stadler
- Stefania Spampinato as Dr. Carina DeLuca
- Jeanine Mason as Dr. Sam Bello
- Alex Blue Davis as Dr. Casey Parker
- Rushi Kota as Dr. Vikram Roy
- Jaicy Elliot as Dr. Taryn Helm
- Sophia Ali as Dr. Dahlia Qadri
- Lesley Boone as Judy Kemp
- Blake Hood as Clive Johnson
- Bethany Joy Lenz as Jenny
- Justin Bruening as Matthew Taylor
- Nayah Damasen as Kimmie Park
- Peyton Kennedy as Betty Nelson
- Candis Cayne as Dr. Michelle Velez
- Rachel Ticotin as Dr. Marie Cerone

=== Notable guests ===
- Scott Speedman as Dr. Nick Marsh
- Debra Mooney as Evelyn Hunt
- Bill Smitrovich as Dr. Walter Carr
- Chelcie Ross as Dr. Harper Avery
- Kate Burton as Dr. Ellis Grey
- Mark Moses as Dr. Larry Maxwell
- Jaina Lee Ortiz as Andrea 'Andy' Herrera
- Mary Kay Place as Olive Warner
- Josh Plasse as Chris Cleaver
- Frankie Faison as William Bailey
- Bianca Taylor as Elena Bailey
- Nicole Cummins as Paramedic Nicole
- Julie Gonzalo as Theresa
- Sarah Utterback as Nurse Olivia Harper
- Lindsay Wagner as Helen Karev
- Geena Davis as Dr. Nicole Herman
- Caleb Pierce as Charlie Peterson
- Alan Chow as Henry

== Production ==
=== Development ===
Grey's Anatomy was renewed for a 14th season on February 10, 2017. It premiered on September 28, 2017, with a 2-hour premiere. Ellen Pompeo announced that she would be directing several episodes in the 14th season. On April 28, 2017, veteran writer Krista Vernoff announced that she would return to the show as a writer after leaving the show after the seventh season. On January 11, 2018, ABC released a 6-episode web series following the new surgical interns at Grey Sloan Memorial Hospital. The web series was written by Barbara Kaye Friend and directed by series-regular Sarah Drew.

=== Casting ===
Series regular Jerrika Hinton does not appear for the first time since her introduction at the start of the ninth season, after it was announced she landed a starring role in Alan Ball's new HBO drama series Here and Now. Hinton had previously been in talks of leaving the show at the end of the 12th season when she was cast in the Shondaland comedy pilot Toast, but ABC passed on the project. Renewing her contract for another 3 seasons as Dr. Arizona Robbins after the eleventh season, Jessica Capshaw returned for the fourteenth season. On June 20, 2017, it was announced that Kim Raver would reprise her role as Dr. Teddy Altman for a guest-arc. In August 2017, it was announced that Abigail Spencer would replace Bridget Regan as Megan Hunt for a multi-episode arc this season. After recurring in the previous season as the controversial character, Eliza Minnick, it was announced in August 2017 that Marika Dominczyk would not return to the show. On September 13, 2017, another guest-star was announced in Greg Germann (Ally McBeal), and later it was revealed that his character would be Tom Koracick, Amelia's neurosurgery mentor.

On October 9, 2017, the new group of interns to join the cast in the fourth episode "Ain't That A Kick In The Head" was announced to include Jeanine Mason (So You Think You Can Dance) as Sam Bello, Alex Blue Davis as Casey Parker, Rushi Kota as Vik Roy, Jaicy Elliot as Taryn Helm, Sophia Ali as Dahlia Qadri, and Jake Borelli as Levi Schmitt. On October 26, 2017, it was announced that Martin Henderson's appearance in the fifth episode titled "Danger Zone" would be his last.

On January 31, 2018, it was announced that Candis Cayne would be joining the show as Dr. Michelle Velez for a multi-episode arc revolving around a transgender character receiving a ground-breaking surgery. On March 8, 2018, it was announced that both Jessica Capshaw and Sarah Drew would leave the series following the conclusion of the season.

It was released on April 4, 2018 that a familiar character would be returning to the set later on in the season as Sarah Utterback's Nurse Olivia Harper would be revisiting Grey Sloan, not as a nurse but as mom of a patient. Details of her storyline or duration of arc have yet to be released. On April 20, 2018, it was released that Geena Davis would return for the episode "Cold as Ice" as Dr. Herman to present a new opportunity for Arizona.

== Ratings ==
=== Live + SD ratings ===
No. in series	No. in season	Episode	Air date	Time slot (EST)	Rating/Share (18–49)	Viewers (M)	18–49 Rank	Viewership rank	Drama rank
294	1	"Break Down the House"	September 28, 2017	Thursday; 8:00 p.m.	2.3/8	8.07	12	24	3
295	2	"Get Off on the Pain"	September 28, 2017	Thursday; 9:00 p.m.	2.3/8	8.07	12	24	3
296	3	"Go Big or Go Home"	October 5, 2017	Thursdays; 8:00 p.m.	2.1/8	8.06	11	21	3
297	4	"Ain't That a Kick in the Head?"	October 12, 2017	Thursdays; 8:00 p.m.	2.1/8	8.08	10	17	2
298	5	"Danger Zone"	October 26, 2017	Thursdays; 8:00 p.m.	1.8/7	7.67	14	22	3
299	6	"Come On Down to My Boat, Baby"	November 2, 2017	Thursdays; 8:00 p.m.	1.8/7	7.38	13	21	3
300	7	"Who Lives, Who Dies, Who Tells Your Story"	November 9, 2017	Thursdays; 8:00 p.m.	1.9/7	8.13	11	19	2
301	8	"Out of Nowhere"	November 16, 2017	Thursdays; 8:00 p.m.	1.8/7	7.52	13	21	4
302	9	"1-800-799-7233"	January 18, 2018	Thursdays; 8:00 p.m.	2.3/9	8.27	7	14	3
303	10	"Personal Jesus"	January 25, 2018	Thursdays; 8:00 p.m.	2.3/9	8.62	3	7	2
304	11	"(Don't Fear) the Reaper"	February 1, 2018	Thursdays; 8:00 p.m.	2.3/9	8.93	5	8	2
305	12	"Harder, Better, Faster, Stronger"	February 8, 2018	Thursdays; 8:00 p.m.	2.0/8	7.32	6	13	2
306	13	"You Really Got a Hold on Me"	March 1, 2018	Thursdays; 8:00 p.m.	2.0/8	7.52	9	17	2
307	14	"Games People Play"	March 8, 2018	Thursdays; 8:00 p.m.	1.7/7	7.07	9	19	2
308	15	"Old Scars, Future Hearts"	March 15, 2018	Thursdays; 8:00 p.m.	1.8/7	7.18	5	15	3
309	16	"Caught Somewhere in Time"	March 22, 2018	Thursdays; 8:00 p.m.	1.9/8	7.61	7	12	1
310	17	"One Day Like This"	March 29, 2018	Thursdays; 8:00 p.m.	1.8/7	7.15	8	19	2
311	18	"Hold Back the River"	April 5, 2018	Thursdays; 8:00 p.m.	1.7/7	6.84	8	20	2
312	19	"Beautiful Dreamer"	April 12, 2018	Thursdays; 8:00 p.m.	1.7/7	6.97	8	16	2
313	20	"Judgment Day"	April 19, 2018	Thursdays; 8:00 p.m.	1.7/7	6.93	6	18	2
314	21	"Bad Reputation"	April 26, 2018	Thursdays; 8:00 p.m.	1.5/6	6.54	7	16	2
315	22	"Fight for Your Mind"	May 3, 2018	Thursdays; 8:00 p.m.	1.6/7	6.66	8	18	2
316	23	"Cold as Ice"	May 10, 2018	Thursdays; 8:00 p.m.	1.9/8	7.35	4	16	1
317	24	"All of Me"	May 17, 2018	Thursdays; 8:00 p.m.	1.9/8	7.60	3	10	1

=== Live + 7 Day (DVR) ratings ===
No. in series	No. in season	Episode	Air date	Time slot (EST)	18–49 increase	Viewers (millions) increase	Total 18-49	Total viewers (millions)	Ref
294	1	"Break Down the House"	September 28, 2017	Thursday; 8:00 p.m.	1.6	3.91	3.9	11.99	
295	2	"Get Off on the Pain"	September 28, 2017	Thursday; 9:00 p.m.	1.6	3.91	3.9	11.99	
296	3	"Go Big or Go Home"	October 5, 2017	Thursdays; 8:00 p.m.	1.6	3.83	3.7	11.89	
297	4	"Ain't That a Kick in the Head?"	October 12, 2017	Thursdays; 8:00 p.m.	1.4	3.51	3.5	11.59	
298	5	"Danger Zone"	October 26, 2017	Thursdays; 8:00 p.m.	1.5	3.54	3.3	11.22	
299	6	"Come On Down to My Boat, Baby"	November 2, 2017	Thursdays; 8:00 p.m.	1.5	3.45	3.2	10.84	
300	7	"Who Lives, Who Dies, Who Tells Your Story"	November 9, 2017	Thursdays; 8:00 p.m.	1.5	3.53	3.4	11.67	
301	8	"Out of Nowhere"	November 16, 2017	Thursdays; 8:00 p.m.	1.5	3.54	3.3	11.07	
302	9	"1-800-799-7233"	January 18, 2018	Thursdays; 8:00 p.m.	1.3	3.30	3.6	11.58	
303	10	"Personal Jesus"	January 25, 2018	Thursdays; 8:00 p.m.	1.3	3.35	3.6	11.98	
304	11	"(Don't Fear) The Reaper"	February 1, 2018	Thursdays; 8:00 p.m.	1.4	3.41	3.7	12.35	
305	12	"Harder, Better, Faster, Stronger"	February 8, 2018	Thursdays; 8:00 p.m.	1.5	3.72	3.5	11.05	
306	13	"You Really Got a Hold on Me"	March 1, 2018	Thursdays; 8:00 p.m.	1.6	3.90	3.6	11.43	
307	14	"Games People Play"	March 8, 2018	Thursdays; 8:00 p.m.	1.5	3.57	3.2	10.65	
308	15	"Old Scars, Future Hearts"	March 15, 2018	Thursdays; 8:00 p.m.	1.5	3.64	3.3	10.82	
309	16	"Caught Somewhere in Time"	March 22, 2018	Thursdays; 8:00 p.m.	1.4	3.25	3.3	10.87	
310	17	"One Day Like This"	March 29, 2018	Thursdays; 8:00 p.m.	1.4	3.50	3.2	10.66	
311	18	"Hold Back the River"	April 5, 2018	Thursdays; 8:00 p.m.	1.4	3.58	3.1	10.43	
312	19	"Beautiful Dreamer"	April 12, 2018	Thursdays; 8:00 p.m.	1.4	3.44	3.1	10.42	
313	20	"Judgment Day"	April 19, 2018	Thursdays; 8:00 p.m.	1.3	3.40	3.0	10.35	
314	21	"Bad Reputation"	April 26, 2018	Thursdays; 8:00 p.m.	1.3	3.31	2.8	9.93	
315	22	"Fight for Your Mind"	May 3, 2018	Thursdays; 8:00 p.m.	1.4	3.44	3.0	10.10	
316	23	"Cold as Ice"	May 10, 2018	Thursdays; 8:00 p.m.	1.4	3.38	3.3	10.71	
317	24	"All of Me"	May 17, 2018	Thursdays; 8:00 p.m.	1.3	3.09	3.3	11.01	

== Home media ==
Grey's Anatomy: The Complete Fourteenth Season
Set Details		Special Features
24 Episodes; 6-Disc Set; English 5.1 Dolby Digital; German & Italian 5.1 Dolby Digital; Spanish 2.0 Dolby Digital (Region 2 Only); Subtitles: English SDH, Spanish, Italian, German & more; Runtime: 1024 minutes		The season 14 DVD set does not include any special features.
Release Dates
Region 1	Region 2	Region 4
N/A	October 22, 2018	October 22, 2018
