= Danger Zone (Grey's Anatomy) =

- Grey's Anatomy episode
- Episode no.: Season 14; Episode 05
- Directed by: Cecilie Mosli
- Written by: Jalysa Conway
- Original air date: October 26, 2017
- Running time: 41 minutes

Guest appearances
- Abigail Spencer as Dr. Megan Hunt; Yasmine Aker as Sana; Kim Raver as Dr. Teddy Altman

Episode chronology
← Previous "Ain't That a Kick in the Head?"	Next → "Come On Down to My Boat, Baby"
- Grey's Anatomy season 14

"Danger Zone" is the fifth episode of the fourteenth season of the American television medical drama Grey's Anatomy, and is the 298th episode overall. It aired on October 26, 2017 on ABC in the United States. The episode was written by Jalysa Conway and directed by Cecilie Mosli; Conway, an Air Force veteran, found inspiration in her own experiences to conceive the episode. "Danger Zone" takes place during two time lapses: the present time, in Seattle, where Owen Hunt (Kevin McKidd) deals with the decision his sister, Megan Hunt (Abigail Spencer) has made with former fiancé Nathan Riggs (Martin Henderson), to move in to Malibu, California with Megan's adopted son from Iraq, Farouk; and in Iraq during 2007, where Megan, Riggs, Owen and his best friend Teddy Altman (Kim Raver) were stationed, explaining the backstory of Megan's kidnapping and Riggs' proposal to her.

"Danger Zone" was designed as the departure for series regular Martin Henderson, having joined the cast in 2015 and conceived originally as the love interest for Meredith Grey (Ellen Pompeo) following the death of her husband, Derek (Patrick Dempsey).

The episode's original broadcast was watched by 7.67 million viewers. It received moderately positive reception from critics and fans, praising Spencer's performance, as well Mosli's direction and Conway's writing, but being less receptive into Martin Henderson's abrupt departure.

== Plot ==
In Iraq in 2007, Megan is waiting to hear back on stratification rankings. She needs to be number one to realise her dream of becoming flight surgeon. As she goes to wake up Nathan, she finds a necklace under a pile of clothes. He claims he intended to propose to her and chose for a necklace rather than a ring since she loses everything that is not attached to her. She accepts and shares the news with Teddy and Owen, but her happiness is quickly crushed when it is announced that she is not number one in the ranking. Megan thinks that Owen, her Commanding Officer, has recommended her, while he actually did the opposite in an attempt to protect her from the dangerous position. As multiple wounded soldiers come in after two of their Iraqi allies went rogue, the siblings end up operating on the same patient and Megan discovers the truth. Meanwhile, Teddy and Nathan operate together. Teddy knows Nathan cheated on Megan because she recognised the necklace as belonging to a woman named Felicia. He admits to cheating and she convinces him to tell Megan the truth since he really does want to marry her. This leads to a heated confrontation between the two, which is interrupted when Megan has to tend to Sana, one of her patients. When Megan tells Owen about Nathan cheating, he tells her to get away from Nathan and board the next evacuation helicopter with the patient, which is against protocol. At the same time, Teddy's patient informs her that the second shooter was actually an Iraqi woman, whom the Army doctors were previously told tried to wrestle the gun out of a man's hands. Teddy connects the dots but she's seconds too late to warn Megan, and can only watch the helicopter fly away. Distraught over both her brother's and Nathan's betrayal, Megan is distracted and does not notice Sana reaching for a gun, which would lead to Megan being kidnapped.

In the present, Owen decides to drive with Megan to her new house in Malibu, which Nathan and Farouk are preparing as they await her arrival. On the road, they happily reminisce about their past but end up fighting over the fact that Owen caused her to lose out on the flight surgeon training. They eventually have a heart-to-heart when he confesses he'd rather have her stay in Seattle with him. She makes it clear it is not his job to protect her anymore, and that she has no reason to hate Nathan for cheating on her as, unbeknownst to Owen, she had cheated on him first. She confides that all those years in captivity have taught her that every little bit of happiness is worth clinging to, regardless of what everyone else thinks. In captivity, she decided she wanted to live on the beach to experience freedom. She also offers Owen some words of wisdom by pointing out that he is very loyal to his ideas and ideals, but that in order to be happy, he might have to break up with some of those ideals. Meanwhile, Nathan and Meredith have their final conversation through texts, in which they thank one another for what they have meant in each other's lives. Megan then joins Nathan and Farouk at their new home. As one happy family, they spend time on the beach.

Owen returns home to Amelia and announces that he has decided they need to separate to be happy again, something she has come to realise as well. They return their rings and hug.

== Production ==
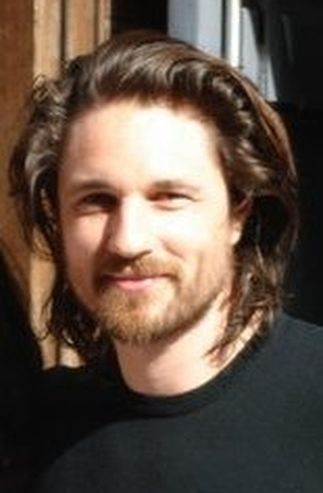
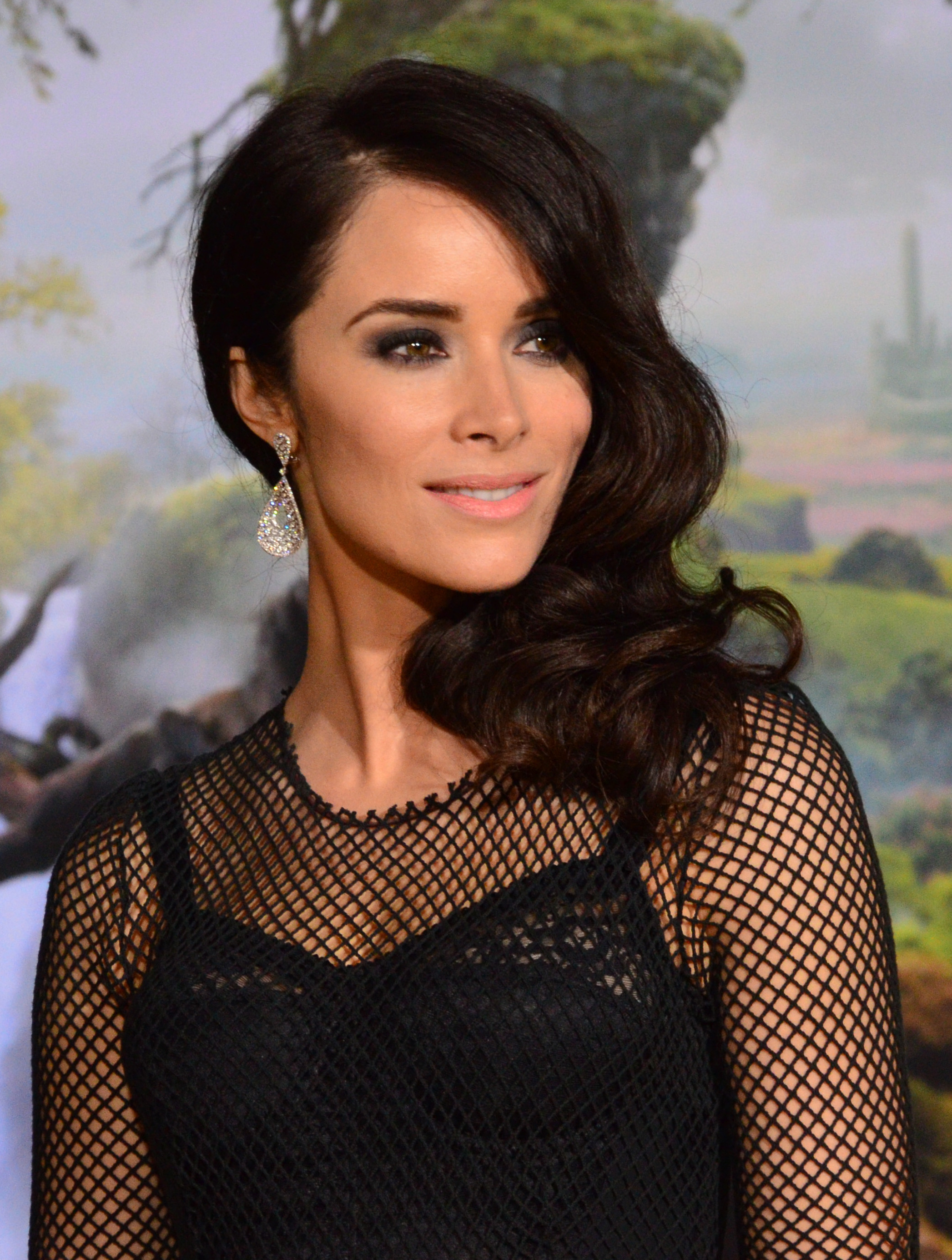
Martin Henderson (left) and Abigail Spencer (right) were prominent actors featured in the episode, with "Danger Zone" being Henderson's final appearance in the series.

The episode marked the final appearance of Nathan Riggs. Shonda Rhimes announced the exit of Martin Henderson as Nathan Riggs via Twitter. She said, "I loved that we were able to give Riggs a happy ending worthy of his character and talent. As for Martin, this is not an ending for our relationship. He has been part of the Shondaland family since the pilot of Inside the Box and he will always be family. I can’t wait to find a new project to work with him on in the future." Henderson indicated in an interview with Deadline that his departure was a storytelling based decision, as he was given a "short-term contract", adding, "This [was] my final year so I was expecting Nathan’s storyline to be wrapped up."

Henderson shared his thoughts on his relationships with both Megan and Meredith

I think there was clearly something for Nathan in those relationships. Feelings like that, I don’t think they go away. The nature of his previous commitment to Megan and his feelings around that put him in a horrible state of having to choose between two people he cares about, but honoring his commitment to Megan and following through on that is the right thing to do. It doesn’t negate his feelings for Meredith. The complications of Meredith’s emotions, the loss of Derek and moving on from that still plagues her. And there’s as much ambiguity around all those feelings. The two of them found each other and that provided good drama. I feel bad for fans who were keen on Meredith and Nathan making it, and not being privy to where each character would go. It’s hard to hear those outpourings from those who didn’t know it was going to end up like this. But it makes for nice drama and it’s something that Shonda does brilliantly: Dashing people’s hopes and expectations. That’s why the show continues to be successful. You can’t predict what will happen to people at any time.

On Owen's decision to break up with Amelia Shepherd (Caterina Scorsone) for good after the successful removal of her tumor, McKidd said, "There’s always a chance with every relationship for reconciliation. Even though it seems, by the end of this episode, that this is what’s to happen with Owen and Amelia, they have a lot of history and there’s a lot of love there. So they are going to try to be friends. That’s their commitment right now. Whether that will be possible, or whether the history and the attraction and the chemistry that they have reignites that, that’s also possible." On how they deal with the break-up, McKidd elaborated further, "They try to be very adult about it. This was a tumor that caused all of this. This was neither of our faults, neither of us is to walk away with blame or guilt or shame, and that’s their starting point. So it’s as healthy as it can be for a breakup. And who knows where that’s going to lead. They both agreed to press the restart button on it all."

Spencer elaborated on the discussion between Megan and Owen, and her advice to live his life single and put himself first. Speaking with TVLine, "Megan was planting a seed that, even if it’s not about Amelia, it’s something you actually have to look at. This is a real pattern for him. He’s holding onto something, and is he willing to let it go? I think she says it in a really beautiful way, because she’s talking about herself, too. She had to let go of a lot of stuff to get where she is. It’s that thing where you tell someone else something about yourself, and then it’s like, "I hope you do something with this" — as only a good sister can."

== Reception ==
"Danger Zone" receive moderate praise by critics; the episode has received an average score of 7.1 out of 10 in IMDb. Entertainment Weekly gave the episode a B grade. Writing for FanSided, Buckie Wells said, "Riggs texting Meredith ‘thank you’ was a sweet end to their relationship, made even sweeter by the ending scenes of his new little family with Megan." Courtney E. Smith for Refinery29 felt apathetic towards the Megan storyline. She summarized, "So, we leave this episode with the field clear. Meredith (Ellen Pompeo) can get a new love interest, as can Amelia. Owen should probably stop getting married. I still don't care about the Megan storyline, so now I never have to think about it again" while suggesting Owen and Teddy begin a relationship.

Maggie Fremont for Vulture gave the episode 4 stars out of 5. On Megan's character, she said, "Megan Hunt is a new character. While her romance with Riggs has a history on the show, it is also new to us viewers. Do not get me wrong: Abigail Spencer as Megan Hunt is amazing. Thanks to her performance and her chemistry with both Kevin McKidd and Martin Henderson, she makes the character feel lived-in. It’s like she’s been here all along. Although I find it easy to be invested in Megan’s story, Megan and Riggs’ romance, and, for better or worse, Owen, I understand the opposite view. If you hated this episode, I totally get it ... but I really liked it. Even if they did totally underuse Kim Raver’s Teddy, which is an affront to all of us. Can we just bring Teddy back for good?" Danielle Jackson for PopSugar was happy that Riggs got a happy ending, saying, "Riggs's exit is a pretty tough pill to swallow, but compared to the ways that a few other less than fortunate characters left the series, we think we'll be able to manage."
