= Patrick McGoohan =

American actor (1928–2009)

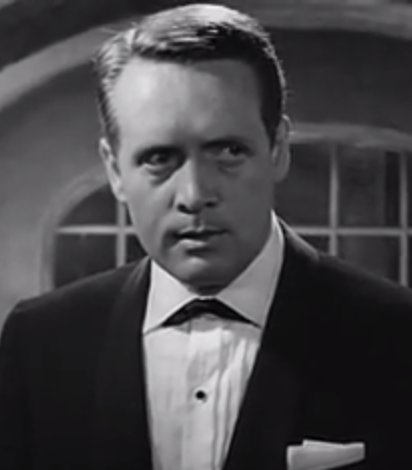
- McGoohan in All Night Long (1962)
- Born: Patrick Joseph McGoohan; March 19, 1928; New York City, New York, U.S.
- Died: January 13, 2009 (aged 80); Santa Monica, California, U.S.
- Other names: Paddy Fitz; Joseph Serf
- Citizenship: Ireland; United States (Note: McGoohan was a citizen of Ireland via Jus sanguinis and the United States via Jus soli)
- Occupations: Actor; director; screenwriter; producer
- Years active: 1948–2002
- Spouse: Joan Drummond (m. 1951)
- Children: 3, including Catherine
- Awards: BAFTA TV Award for Best Actor (1960); Primetime Emmy Award for Outstanding Guest Actor in a Drama Series (1975, 1990)

Patrick Joseph McGoohan (/məˈɡuː.ən/; March 19, 1928 – January 13, 2009) was an Irish-American actor, director, producer, and writer. Born in New York City to Irish parents, he was raised in Ireland and the United Kingdom. He began his career in Britain during the 1950s and became well known for the titular role of secret agent John Drake in the ITC espionage programme Danger Man (1960–68). He then created and produced the surrealistic ITV series The Prisoner (1967–68), in which he starred as former British intelligence agent Number Six.

Beginning in the 1970s, McGoohan maintained a long-running association with the television series Columbo, writing, directing, producing and appearing in several episodes. His notable film roles included David Jones in Ice Station Zebra (1968); James Stewart, 1st Earl of Moray in Mary, Queen of Scots (1971); the Warden in Escape from Alcatraz (1979); Dr. Paul Ruth in Scanners (1981); King Edward I in Braveheart (1995); Judge Omar Noose in A Time to Kill (1996); and the voice of Billy Bones in Treasure Planet (2002).

During the height of Danger Man's fame in the 1960s, McGoohan was the highest-paid actor on British television. McGoohan won the 1960 BAFTA Television Award for Best Actor, and twice won the Primetime Emmy Award for Outstanding Guest Actor in a Drama Series, including its inaugural 1975 entry, for roles on Columbo. He was also nominated for a Drama Desk Award for his role in the Broadway play Pack of Lies.

== Early life ==
Patrick Joseph McGoohan was born in Astoria, Queens, New York City on March 19, 1928, to Irish Catholic immigrant parents Thomas McGoohan and Rose McGoohan (née Fitzpatrick). Soon after he was born, the family returned to Ireland, settling in the Mullaghmore area of Drumreilly, County Leitrim.

Seven years later, they relocated to England, settling in Sheffield, West Riding of Yorkshire. McGoohan attended St Marie's School, then St Vincent's School, and De La Salle College, all in Sheffield. During World War II, he was evacuated to Loughborough, where he attended Ratcliffe College at the same time as future actor Ian Bannen. McGoohan excelled in mathematics and boxing, and left school at the age of 16 to return to Sheffield, where he worked as a chicken farmer, bank clerk, and lorry driver before getting a job as a stage manager for Sheffield Repertory Theatre. When one of the actors became ill, McGoohan substituted for him, which began his acting career.

== Career ==
=== Early career ===
In 1955, McGoohan featured in a West End stage production of Serious Charge, as a Church of England vicar accused of being homosexual.

"Intimidated" by McGoohan's stage presence, Orson Welles cast him as Starbuck in his York theatre production of Moby Dick—Rehearsed. Welles said in 1969 that he believed McGoohan "would now be, I think, one of the big actors of our generation if TV hadn't grabbed him," reflecting that he had "all the required attributes, looks, intensity, unquestionable acting ability and a twinkle in his eye".

McGoohan's first television appearance was as Charles Stewart Parnell in "The Fall of Parnell" for the series You Are There (1954). He had an uncredited role in the movie The Dam Busters (1955), standing guard outside a briefing room. He delivered the line, "Sorry, old boy, it's secret—you can't go in. Now, c'mon, hop it!," which was cut from some prints of the movie.

He also had small roles in Passage Home (1955), The Dark Avenger (1955) and I Am A Camera (1955). He could also be seen in Zarak (1956) for Warwick Films. For television he was in "Margin for Error" in Terminus (1955), guest featured on The Adventures of Sir Lancelot and Assignment Foreign Legion, and The Adventures of Aggie. He played the lead in "The Makepeace Story" for BBC Sunday Night Theatre (1955). He also appeared in Welles' movie version of Moby Dick—Rehearsed.

He did Ring for Catty on stage in 1956.

=== Rank Organisation ===
While working as a stand-in during screen tests, McGoohan was signed to a contract with The Rank Organisation. They gave him mostly villainous parts in films, including High Tide at Noon (1957), directed by Philip Leacock; Hell Drivers (1957), directed by Cy Endfield; and The Gypsy and the Gentleman (1958), directed by Joseph Losey.

He had frequent roles in television anthology series such as Television Playwright, Folio, Armchair Theatre, ITV Play of the Week and ITV Television Playhouse. He was given a leading role in Nor the Moon by Night (1958), filmed in South Africa. After some disputes with Rank management, the contract was dissolved. He then did some TV work, winning a BAFTA in 1960.

His favourite part for stage acting was the lead in Henrik Ibsen's Brand, for which he received an award. Michael Meyer, the play's translator, wrote of the last act "McGoohan suddenly unleashed all his terrifying power, and from then until the final moments... the audience was gripped as seldom happens in a theatre." He also played the role in a BBC television production in August 1959. Michael Meyer, who translated the stage version, thought McGoohan's performance was the best and most powerful he had ever seen. It was McGoohan's last stage appearance for 28 years.

=== Danger Man ===
Production executive Lew Grade soon approached McGoohan about a television series where he would play a spy named John Drake. Having learned from his experience at Rank, McGoohan insisted on several conditions: all the fistfights should be different; the character would always use his brain before using a gun; and—much to the executives' horror—no kissing. The show debuted in 1960 as Danger Man, a half-hour programme intended for American audiences. It did fairly well, but not as well as hoped.

Production lasted a year and 39 episodes. After the first series was over, an interviewer asked McGoohan if he would have liked it to continue. He replied, "Perhaps, but let me tell you this: I would rather do twenty TV series than go through what I went through under that Rank contract I signed a few years ago and for which I blame no one but myself."

=== Post-Danger Man ===
McGoohan appeared in the movie Two Living, One Dead (1961), filmed in Sweden. He featured in two movies directed by Basil Dearden: All Night Long, an updating of Othello, and Life for Ruth (both 1962). He also featured in an adaptation of The Quare Fellow (1962) by Brendan Behan.

McGoohan was one of several actors considered for the role of James Bond in Dr. No. While McGoohan, a Catholic, refused the role on moral grounds, the success of the Bond films is generally cited as the reason for Danger Man being revived. (He was later considered for the same role in Live and Let Die, but refused again.)

McGoohan spent some time working for The Walt Disney Company on The Three Lives of Thomasina (1963) and The Scarecrow of Romney Marsh (1963). A staid English vicar, Dr. Christopher Syn (a reformed pirate captain - played by McGoohan) disguised as a scarecrow and mounted on a magnificent black stallion thwarts King George III's Revenue officers in daring night-time smuggling adventures on the remote Kent coast.

=== Return of Danger Man ===
After he had also refused the role of Simon Templar in The Saint, Lew Grade asked McGoohan if he wanted to give John Drake another try. This time, McGoohan had even more say about the series. Danger Man (Secret Agent in the US) was resurrected in 1964 as a one-hour programme. The scripts now allowed McGoohan more range in his acting. Because of the popularity of the series, he became the highest-paid actor in the UK, and the show lasted almost three more years.

After shooting the only two colour episodes of Danger Man, McGoohan told Grade that he would quit the role.

=== The Prisoner ===
Knowing McGoohan's intention to quit Danger Man, Grade asked if he would at least work on "something" for him. McGoohan pitched a miniseries about a secret agent who angrily quits and is abducted to a surreal, cheerful holiday resort village. Grade asked for a budget, McGoohan had one ready, and they made a deal over a handshake early on a Saturday morning to produce The Prisoner.

In addition to being the series' protagonist, McGoohan was its executive producer, forming Everyman Films with producer David Tomblin, and also wrote and directed several episodes, in some cases using pseudonyms. The originally commissioned seven episodes became seventeen.

The title character, the otherwise-unnamed "Number Six", spends the entire series trying to escape from a mysterious prison community called "The Village", and to learn the identity of its ruler. The Village's administrators try just as much to force or trick him into revealing why he resigned as a spy, which he refuses to divulge. The series' main exterior filming location was the Italianate resort village of Portmeirion, Gwynedd, Wales, which had been featured in some episodes of Danger Man.

=== MGM ===
During production of The Prisoner, MGM cast McGoohan in an action movie, Ice Station Zebra (1968), for which his performance as a British spy drew critical praise.

After the end of The Prisoner, he presented a TV show, Journey into Darkness (1968–69). He was meant to follow it with the lead role of Dirk Struan in an expensive adaptation of the James Clavell best-seller Tai-Pan but the project was cancelled before filming. Instead he made the movie The Moonshine War (1970) for MGM.

=== 1970s ===
McGoohan played James Stewart, 1st Earl of Moray in Mary, Queen of Scots (1971). He directed Richie Havens in a rock opera version of Othello, entitled Catch My Soul (1974), but disliked the experience.

McGoohan received two Emmy Awards for his work for the television series Columbo, with his long-time friend Peter Falk. McGoohan said that his first appearance on Columbo (in the 1974 episode "By Dawn's Early Light") was probably his favourite American role. He directed five Columbo episodes (including three of the four in which he appeared), one of which he also wrote and two of which he also produced. McGoohan was involved with the Columbo series in some capacity from 1974 to 2000; his daughter Catherine McGoohan appeared with him in the episode "Ashes to Ashes" (1998). The other two Columbo episodes in which he appeared are "Identity Crisis" (1975) and "Agenda for Murder" (1990).

As he had done early in his career with the Rank Organisation, McGoohan began to specialise in villains, appearing in A Genius, Two Partners and a Dupe (1975), Silver Streak (1976) and The Man in the Iron Mask (1977).

In 1977, he had the main role of the television series Rafferty as a retired army doctor who moves into private practice.

He had the lead in a Canadian movie, Kings and Desperate Men; then had supporting parts in Brass Target (1978) and the Clint Eastwood movie Escape from Alcatraz (1979), portraying the prison's warden.

=== 1980s ===
In 1980 he appeared in the UK television movie The Hard Way.

In 1981 he appeared in the science fiction/horror movie Scanners, and in Jamaica Inn (1983) and Trespasses (1984). When McGoohan saw Jamaica Inn he decided he could no longer act and rejected invitations by Michael Elliott to play Captain Ahab and Hotspur.

In 1985 he appeared in his only Broadway production, featuring opposite Rosemary Harris in Hugh Whitemore's Pack of Lies, in which he played another British spy. He was nominated for a Drama Desk Award as Best Actor for his performance.

He could also be seen in the movies Baby: Secret of the Lost Legend (1985) and Of Pure Blood (1986) as well as an episode of Murder, She Wrote.

=== 1990s ===
McGoohan featured in The Best of Friends (1991), and featured as King Edward I in Braveheart (1995) which revitalised his career; he was seen the following year as Judge Omar Noose in A Time to Kill and in The Phantom, a cinema adaptation of the comic strip.

=== 2000s ===
In 2000, he reprised his role as Number Six in an episode of The Simpsons, "The Computer Wore Menace Shoes". In it, Homer Simpson concocts a news story to make his website more popular, and he wakes up in a prison disguised as a holiday resort. Dubbed Number Five, he meets Number Six, and later betrays him and escapes with his boat; referencing his numerous attempts to escape on a raft in The Prisoner, Number Six splutters "That's the third time that's happened!"

McGoohan's last movie role was the voice of Billy Bones in the Disney animated film Treasure Planet (2002). That same year, he received a Prometheus Hall of Fame Award for The Prisoner.

McGoohan's name was associated with several aborted attempts at producing a new movie version of The Prisoner. In 2002, Simon West was signed to direct a version of the story. McGoohan was listed as executive producer for the movie, which never came to fruition. Later, Christopher Nolan was proposed as director for a movie version. However, the source material remained difficult and elusive to adapt into a feature movie. McGoohan was not involved with the project that was ultimately completed. A miniseries was filmed for the AMC network in late 2008, with its broadcast occurring during November 2009.

== Personal life ==
McGoohan married actress Joan Drummond on May 19, 1951. They had three children including Catherine McGoohan. A devout Catholic, McGoohan "would not act any part in which he had to kiss any actress who was not his wife (and she, looking after him and their small daughters, had little time for acting)", which somewhat restricted his choice.

For most of the 1960s they lived in a secluded detached house on The Ridgeway, Mill Hill, London. They settled in the Pacific Palisades district of Los Angeles during the mid-1970s.

=== Death ===
McGoohan died following a "short illness" at Saint John's Health Center in Santa Monica, California, on January 13, 2009, at the age of 80.

A biography of McGoohan was published in 2007 by Tomahawk Press, and another followed in 2011 by Supernova Books.

== Filmography ==
=== Film ===
Year	Title	Role	Notes
1955	Passage Home	McIsaacs	
1955	The Dark Avenger	English soldier	Uncredited
1955	The Dam Busters	RAF guard	Uncredited
1955	I Am a Camera	Swedish water therapist	
1956	Zarak	Moor Larkin	
1957	High Tide at Noon	Simon Breck	
1957	Hell Drivers	G. 'Red' Redman	
1958	The Gypsy and the Gentleman	Jess	
1958	Nor the Moon by Night	Andrew Miller	
1961	Two Living, One Dead	Erik Berger	
1962	All Night Long	Johnny Cousin	
1962	Life for Ruth	Dr. Jim Brown	
1962	The Quare Fellow	Thomas Crimmin	
1963	The Three Lives of Thomasina	Andrew McDhui	
1963	Dr. Syn, Alias the Scarecrow	Dr. Christopher Syn	
1968	Ice Station Zebra	David Jones	
1970	The Moonshine War	Frank Long	
1971	Mary, Queen of Scots	James Stuart	
1974	Catch My Soul	—N/a	Director
1975	A Genius, Two Partners and a Dupe	Maj. Cabot	
1976	Silver Streak	Roger Devereau	
1978	Brass Target	Col. Mike McCauley	
1979	Escape from Alcatraz	The Warden	
1980	The Hard Way	John Connor	
1981	Scanners	Dr. Paul Ruth	
1981	Kings and Desperate Men	John Kingsley	Filmed in 1977
1984	Trespasses	Fred Wells	
1985	Baby: Secret of the Lost Legend	Dr. Eric Kiviat	
1995	Braveheart	King Edward Longshanks	
1996	The Phantom	The 20th Phantom	
1996	A Time to Kill	Judge Omar Noose	
1997	Hysteria	Dr. Harvey Langston	
2002	Treasure Planet	Billy Bones (voice)	

=== Television ===
Year	Title	Role	Notes
1954	You Are There	Charles Stewart Parnell	Episode: "The Fall Of Parnell"
1955	The Vise	Tony Mason	Episode: "Gift from Heaven"
1955	Terminus	James Hartley	Episode: "Margin for Error"
1955	The Makepeace Story	Seth Makepeace	Episode: "The Ruthless Destiny"
1956	The Adventures of Sir Lancelot	Sir Glavin	Episode: "The Outcast"
1957	Assignment Foreign Legion	Captain Valadon	Episode: "The Coward"
1956–1957	The Adventures of Aggie	Migual	Episode: "Spanish Sauce"
1958	The Vise	Tom Vance	Episode: "Blood in the Sky"
1958	Armchair Theatre	Jack 'Pal' Smurch	Episode: "The Greatest Man in the World"
1958	Television Playwright Presents	James Coogan	Episode: "This Day in Fear"
1958	ITV Television Playhouse	Mat Galvin	Episode: "Rest in Violence"
1961	Armchair Theatre	Nicholai Soloviov	Episode: "The Man Out There"
1960–1962, 1964–1968	Danger Man	John Drake	Main role; 86 episodes. Director; 3 episodes.
1963	Walt Disney's Wonderful World of Color	Doctor Christopher Syn/ Scarecrow of Romney Marsh	3 episodes
1963	Sunday Night Play	The Interrogator	Episode: "The Prisoner"
1967–1968	The Prisoner	Number Six	Main role; 17 episodes Director; 5 episodes
1974–1976, 1987, 1990, 1998	Columbo	Col. Lyle C. Rumford, Nelson Brenner, Oscar Finch, Eric Prince	Guest actor; 4 episodes Director; 5 episodes Co-Exec. producer; 2 episodes
1977	Rafferty	Doctor Sid Rafferty	13 episodes Director; 1 episode
1985	American Playhouse	Chief magistrate	3 episodes
1987	Murder, She Wrote	Oliver Quayle	Episode: "Witness for the Defense"
1992	Masterpiece Theatre	George Bernard Shaw	Episode: "The Best of Friends"
2000	The Simpsons	Number Six (voice)	Episode: "The Computer Wore Menace Shoes"

==== TV films, miniseries, and specials ====
Year	Title	Role	Notes
1959	Brand	Brand	
1969	Journey into Darkness	Host	
1977	The Man in the Iron Mask	Fouquet	
1980	The Hard Way	John Connor	
1983	Jamaica Inn	Joss Merlyn	
1986	Of Pure Blood	Dr. Felix Neumann	

== Partial stage credits ==
Year	Title	Role	Venue	Notes
1945	Pride and Prejudice	Mr D'Arcy	Vincent's Youth Club, Sheffield	Amateur production
1950–1951	The Rivals		Theatre Royal, Bath	
1951	The Little Foxes	Oscar Hubbard	Sheffield Playhouse, Sheffield	
1951	Man and Superman	John Tanner	Sheffield Playhouse, Sheffield	
1951–1952	Hobson's Choice	Albert Prosser	Grand Theatre, Blackpool	
1951–1952	Hobson's Choice	Albert Prosser	Arts Theatre, London	
1952–1953	Henry V		Bristol Old Vic, Bristol	
1952–1953	Henry V		The Old Vic, London	
1952	The Taming of the Shrew	Petruchio	Sheffield Playhouse, Sheffield	
1952	Cupid and Psyche		Royal Court Theatre, Liverpool	
1953	Spring Model	Roy Mawson	Theatre Royal, Windsor	
1953	The Castiglioni Brothers	Camillo Castiglioni	Bristol Old Vic, Bristol	
1953	The Cherry Orchard	Peter Trofimov	Bristol Old Vic, Bristol	
1953	Antony and Cleopatra	Pompey / Schoolmaster	Bristol Old Vic, Bristol	
1953	Old Bailey	Robert Bailey II	Bristol Old Vic, Bristol	
1953	The River Line	Philip Sturgess	Theatre Royal, Windsor	
1953	Time on Their Hands	Leonard White	Q Theatre, London	
1954	Burning Bright		Q Theatre, London	
1954	Spring Model		Q Theatre, London	
1954	Grace and Favour		Producer and director	
1955	Serious Charge	Howard Phillips	Garrick Theatre, London	
1955	Serious Charge	Howard Phillips	Winter Gardens, Morecambe	
1955	Moby Dick – Rehearsed	A Serious Actor / Starbuck	Duke of York's Theatre, London	
1955	Ring For Catty	Leonard White	Coliseum Theatre, Harrow, Lyric Theatre, London	
1955	Brand	Brand	Lyric Theatre, London	
1959	Danton's Death	St. Just	Lyric Theatre, London	
1985	Pack of Lies	Stewart	Royale Theater, New York	

== Awards and nominations ==
Award	Year	Category	Work	Result	Ref.
British Academy Television Award	1960	Best Actor	Brand	Won	
Drama Desk Award	1985	Outstanding Actor in a Play	Pack of Lies	Nominated	
Hugo Awards	1969	Best Dramatic Presentation	The Prisoner ("Fall Out")	Nominated	
Primetime Emmy Awards	1975	Outstanding Guest Actor in a Drama Series	Columbo ("By Dawn's Early Light")	Won	
Primetime Emmy Awards	1990	Outstanding Guest Actor in a Drama Series	Columbo ("Agenda for Murder")	Won	
