= Of Pure Blood =

- Genre: Drama
- Based on: Of Pure Blood by Clarissa Henry; Marc Hillel
- Teleplay by: Michael Zagor
- Story by: Del Coleman; Michael Zagor
- Directed by: Joseph Sargent
- Starring: Lee Remick; Patrick McGoohan; Gottfried John
- Theme music composer: Brad Fiedel
- Country of origin: United States
- Original language: English

Production
- Executive producer: Kip Gowans
- Producer: Joseph Sargent
- Production locations: Munich, Bavaria, Germany
- Cinematography: Franz Rath
- Editor: Carl Pingitore
- Running time: 120 min.
- Production companies: Joseph Sargent Productions; K-M Productions; Warner Bros. Television

Original release
- Network: CBS
- Release: October 19, 1986

Of Pure Blood is a 1986 made-for-TV thriller for CBS that premiered on October 19, 1986, directed by Joseph Sargent and starring Lee Remick.

== Plot ==
Alicia Browning (Remick) is a casting director in New York City whose grown son is shot to death in Munich, Germany by police when he apparently tried to attack a doctor who was attending the annual Oktoberfest. When Alicia travels to Germany—her native homeland—to investigate, she finds the old Nazi Lebensborn breeding programs still alive and wanting her son's child—her grandchild—that he fathered with a German girlfriend before his death, for their attempts to recreate Hitler's so-called 'master race' and a modern-day Fourth Reich.

== Cast ==
- Lee Remick as Alicia Browning
  - Eszter Marai as young Alicia Browning
- Patrick McGoohan as Dr. Felix Neumann
- Gottfried John as Paul Bergmann
- Richard Münch as Dr. Bamberg
- Katharina Böhm as Ursula Schiller
- Carolyn Nelson Sargent as Johanna
- Catherine McGoohan as Pru
- Hans-Jürgen Schatz as Bank Manager
- Pascal Breuer as Eric
- Beate Finckh as Marta
- Shane Rimmer as The Colonel
