= Raider of the South Seas =

1991 New Zealand/Canadian mystery drama television series

- Created by: Roger Simpson
- Written by: Roger Simpson; Chris Hampson
- Directed by: Chris Bailey
- Starring: Martin Henderson; Dean O'Gorman; Rachel Crowther
- Composer: Matthew Brown
- Country of origin: New Zealand
- Original language: English
- No. of seasons: 1
- No. of episodes: 8

Production
- Producers: Sean Ryerson; Chris Bailey
- Cinematography: Michael O'Connor
- Editor: Christine Munro
- Running time: 24 minutes
- Production company: South Pacific Pictures / Atlantis Films

Original release
- Release: 10 February – 31 March 1991

Raider of the South Seas is a 1991 New Zealand/Canadian mystery drama television series for children. It was nominated for Best drama series/serial at the 1993 New Zealand Film and Television Awards.

Set in a small Northland town during World War Two. Three teens, Bobby, Jack and Kate, come across a mysterious ship. They have to deal with mines and smugglers.

== Cast ==
- Dean O'Gorman as Bobby Morrison
- Martin Henderson as Jack Taylor
- Rachel Crowther as Kate Morrison
- Andy Anderson as Bill Taylor
- George Buza as The Raider
- Roy Billing as Ted Grundy
- Pete Smith as George
- Vicky Haughton as Jean Taylor
- Linden Wilkinson as Elspeth Morrison
- Jane Irwin as Lola Dean

== Broadcast history ==
Raider of the South Seas debuted in New Zealand on 10 February 1991 as an eight part series. On 7 December it played in Canada as two 2 hour long episodes.
