= Zilch! =

1985 New Zealand thriller film

- Directed by: Richard Riddiford
- Written by: Jonathan Dowling; Richard Riddiford
- Produced by: Amanda Hocquard
- Starring: Michael Mizrahi; Lucy Sheehan; John Watson
- Cinematography: Murray Milne
- Edited by: Chris Todd
- Music by: Chris Knox
- Production companies: Park Avenue Productions; Vardex Group; New Zealand Film Commission
- Release date: 1989
- Running time: 99 minutes
- Country: New Zealand
- Language: English

Zilch! is a 1989 New Zealand thriller, directed by Richard Riddiford.

== Synopsis ==
A man (Sam) overhears a phone call about corruption and blackmail amidst the bidding process for the construction of an Auckland, New Zealand cross-harbour tunnel.

== Cast ==
- Michael Mizrahi as Sam
- Lucy Sheehan as Anna
- John Watson as Curtis
- Eddie Campbell as Tony
- Peter Tait as Eric
- Roy Billing as Gary Hyde
- William Bullock as Harbour Commissioner
- Sylvia Rands as Melissa
- Andy Anderson as Lawyer
- Louise Graham as Amber
- Peter Stevens as Todd
- Frank Whitten as Engineer
- Lee Grant as Cara
- Brenda Kendall as Tolls Supervisor
- Marie Adams
- Stefan Segadin
- Anna Cahill
- Catriona Caird
- Eva Radich
- Michael Josey as Policeman

== Reviews ==
- 1990 Auckland Star - “Edgy Zilch! flies high”.
- 2007 Studies in New Zealand culture - New Zealand film reviews from North & South.
