= The Navigator: A Medieval Odyssey =

- Directed by: Vincent Ward
- Written by: Geoff Chapple; Kely Lyons; Vincent Ward
- Produced by: John Maynard
- Starring: Chris Haywood; Marshall Napier; Paul Livingston; Jay Laga'aia
- Cinematography: Geoffrey Simpson
- Edited by: John Scott
- Music by: Davood A. Tabrizi
- Distributed by: Home Cinema Group
- Release date: December 1988
- Running time: 93 minutes
- Countries: New Zealand; Australia
- Language: English
- Budget: A$4.3 million
- Box office: A$480,344 (Australia)) NZ$533,000 (New Zealand)

The Navigator: A Medieval Odyssey (Note: Also known as The Navigator: An Odyssey Across Time and The Navigator: A Time-Travel Adventure) is a 1988 feature film, an official Australian-New Zealand co-production, directed by Vincent Ward. It won numerous New Zealand and Australian awards, including the Australian Film Institute Award for Best Film, and several awards at European fantasy film festivals.

== Plot ==
During the Black Death of mid-14th century England, people in a remote Cumbrian mountain village listen with fear to tales of the gruesome plague that has engulfed the world. In an attempt to stave off the infection, they rely upon the visions of a boy, named Griffin, who has a reputation for having a kind of "second sight". With the backing of the village's most famous adventurer, a man named Connor, whom Griffin idolizes, a group of the townsfolk travel to a nearby cavern. Bringing good copper ore to be melted and cast into shape, they dig down into the earth, all the while racing against time and the coming of the next full moon, in an effort to place a holy cross on the steeple of "the biggest Church in all of Christendom" as an offering for God's protection.

As the full moon is rising, the villagers break through into a smooth-lined tunnel, and then, finding a ladder, climb up and into late 20th century New Zealand. Up until this point, the film has been shown in black and white. Now the adventure continues in colour film. The villagers marvel at the various technologies, never questioning what year it might be, believing that such things are only natural in great cities, but Griffin is haunted by a dark vision as the villagers come closer to fulfilling their quest.

== Cast ==
- Bruce Lyons as Connor
- Chris Haywood as Arno
- Hamish McFarlane as Griffin
- Marshall Napier as Searle
- Noel Appleby as Ulf
- Paul Livingston as Martin
- Sarah Peirse as Linnet
- Mark Wheatley as Tog 1
- Tony Herbert as Tog 2
- Jessica Cardiff-Smith as Esme
- Roy Wesney as Grandpa
- Kathleen-Elizabeth Kelly as Grandma
- Jay Saussey as Griffin's girlfriend
- Charles Walker as Old Chrissie
- Desmond Kelly as Smithy
- Bill Le Marquand as Tom
- Jay Laga'aia as Jay
- Norman Fairley as Submarine Captain
- Alistair Babbage as Grigor
- Barron Christian as American Submarine Captain

== Development and production ==
The idea for the film originated when Ward attempted to cross a German autobahn and became stranded in the middle. This inspired Ward (while trapped on the motorway) to imagine what it would be like for a medieval person to find themselves in such a 20th-century situation. He was also inspired by a report about two Papua New Guinean tribesmen who briefly visited an Australian city, and the child's myth of digging through the earth and coming out the other side. The original script was "a broad comedy, rather brash and funny and full of warrior gnomes".

The film is in part an attempt to view modern life in a way which makes it seem strange and fresh, as if seen for the first time, and speculation about what the ancestors of modern New Zealanders might make of them and their world. Ward has made several analogies between 1980s New Zealanders and the medieval characters in the film. He has said that "many New Zealanders going overseas for the first time are trusting and almost medieval in their outlook" and has also compared the medievals' attempts to fend off the plague with New Zealand's nuclear free policy (alluded to in the nuclear submarine scene) and its consequences, particularly the Rainbow Warrior bombing. In both cases a small community attempts to determine its own fate in the face of a larger power. Ward also felt that there were more general similarities between the 14th and 20th centuries, in particular large-scale war and (in the context of 1980s fears about AIDS) terrifying disease. However he has also said that too much can be made of the film's paralleling of the bubonic plague and AIDS.

Despite its various analogies, Ward has said that the film is not intended to convey any single particular message: "Mainly it's an adventure story... I don't want to seem too heavy – basically it's about some people burrowing through the earth". Elsewhere, however, he has said that the film is "about faith – about the basic need to maintain belief in something, anything, no matter what".

=== Filming and production design ===
Ward and his production team based the look of the film on extensive research into the Middle Ages, particularly the mining industry, although this was then rendered imaginatively. The colours of the film are based on medieval art and, in particular, medieval and renaissance artists' ideas about heaven and hell. The blues in many of the modern-day sequences are based on the inks in the Très Riches Heures du Duc de Berry, while the reds and oranges of the motorway lights and furnace fires evoke images of hell in the works of Hieronymous Bosch, Pieter Brueghel and Matthias Grünewald. Ward later said he had not achieved what he wanted to with the colour of the modern-day scenes due to the film's short shooting schedule. The colour in the medieval scenes, which were turned into black and white, was far better than that in the 20th-century scenes. Some of the mining scenes were inspired by engravings from the German mining manual De re metallica, although it dates from two centuries after the time of those scenes. The angel of death seen flying across the moon at one point is based on a medieval engraving in Paris' Père Lachaise Cemetery.

The film was shot in a range of New Zealand locations, including Auckland, Wellington, Mount Ruapehu and Lake Harris in the Southern Alps. The spire in the climactic scene is of St Patrick's Cathedral, Auckland.

Filming of The Navigator was extremely difficult, due to the elaborate nature of some of the shots (for example one featuring a horse in a dinghy), the remoteness of some of the locations, and Ward's perfectionism. Lake Harris, where some of the medieval scenes were filmed, is 1000 metres above sea level and the crew could only film when the area was too cold for mountaineering. In addition, the crew had just ten weeks to shoot the entire film and much of the filming was done at night. After seeing the film, Werner Herzog, who is known for extremely difficult shoots, was reported to have said that "it must have been hard to make". In 1989 Ward said that "I'll never do this sort of film again, full stop. That's because it was just too gruelling for everyone".

The film was also affected, and nearly cancelled, because of funding difficulties. Until the mid-1980s the New Zealand tax system gave generous tax breaks to investors in New Zealand films. Under the fourth Labour government's Rogernomics reforms these were abolished, causing The Navigator to lose funding six weeks before principal photography was due to begin in 1986. The film was delayed for a year, until it became the first Australia-New Zealand co-production, partially funded by the Australian Film Commission. Australian critics regarded the film as "essentially New Zealand" although Ward does not see it as being specifically tied to New Zealand.

=== Cast ===
- Bruce Lyons as Connor: The Navigator was one of only two films in which Lyons acted; the other was Model Behavior, a mostly forgotten 1984 romantic comedy. Ward had had difficulty casting the role of Connor, having searched for and failed to find an actor who could appear a hero to nine-year-old Griffin but convey a sense of ordinariness to the audience. Apart from his role in Model Behavior, Lyons had acted in off Broadway plays to favourable reviews. At the time Ward contacted him, having known him personally in New York, Lyons had not acted for two years and had taken up painting. He was married to Kely Lyons, one of Ward's co-writers, who had "always conceived of him as Connor".
- Chris Haywood as Arno: Haywood was an established actor who had played dozens of parts in Australian television and film when he was cast in The Navigator.
- Hamish McFarlane as Griffin: Ward saw thousands of schoolboys before casting McFarlane, who had never acted on screen before, as the boy visionary Griffin. Qualities Ward sought out included "something special about his eyes", the need for the actor "to look like a nine-year-old who could do a ten-hour day in a medieval mine, probably quite thin, and quite hardy... [and] he had to be capable of a little bit of humour and cheekiness". For his role, McFarlane was nominated for an Australian Film Institute Award for best actor. Despite this he did not continue an acting career into adulthood, instead becoming an assistant director on a range of New Zealand films and television shows.
- Marshall Napier as Searle: Napier was another established film actor, who had appeared in various New Zealand films including Goodbye Pork Pie and Came a Hot Friday.
- Noel Appleby as Ulf: Ward has claimed that he "found Ulf the Fat working for the city council in the Auckland sewers. Noel Appleby was shy during the audition and had no film experience, but he was the character... he turned out to be a natural actor". In fact Appleby had played minor but credited roles in three New Zealand films before The Navigator. He won an Australian Film Institute Award for best supporting actor for his role, and went on to act in several other New Zealand films, including two of the Lord of the Rings films.

=== Soundtrack ===
The soundtrack of The Navigator was composed by Davood Tabrizi and based on a huge variety of musical styles including Celtic music, Scottish military music, Gregorian chants, and nineteenth century mining music, with influences from the Middle East.

== Reception ==
The Navigator was officially chosen for competition at the 1988 Cannes Film Festival, and although it won no awards it received a five-minute standing ovation. Caryn James of the New York Times described the film as "a dark, thrilling fantasy that places Mr. Ward... among the most innovative and authoritative young film makers", and gave it four and half out of five stars. On Rotten Tomatoes, the film received an 88% approval rating based on eight reviews, with an average rating of 6.8/10.

=== Awards ===
- Fantafestival, Rome: Jury Prize, Best Film.
- Cinema Fantastic, Sitges Film Festival, Spain: Best Film.
- International Festival of Fantasy Films, Munich: Best Film.
- Australian Film Institute Awards: Best Film, Best Direction, Best Cinematography, Best Editing, Best Production Design, Best Costume Design.
- Fantasporto, Portugal: Best Film (1989)
- New Zealand Film and Television Awards: Best Film, Best Male Performance (Hamish McFarlane), Best Female Performance in a Supporting Role (Sarah Peirse), Best Male Performance in a Supporting Role (Noel Appleby), Best Cinematography, Best Soundtrack, Best Director, Best Editing, Best Film Score, Best Original Screenplay, Best Production Design.

== Critical analysis ==
New Zealand film critic Russell Campbell argued that the film was part of the surrealist tradition; in particular, it rejected the "rationalism" which results in nuclear weapons.

== Influence on popular culture ==
The song "Farside of the World", from Ayreon's album Actual Fantasy, was inspired by the film.

The Navigator: A Medieval Odyssey was shown on BBC One in the early Nineties. It was also shown as part of the Bedford Civic Film Festival in 1989.

== See also ==
- Middle Ages in film
