= Vigil (film) =

1984 film

- Film poster
- Directed by: Vincent Ward
- Written by: Vincent Ward; Graeme Tetley
- Produced by: John Maynard
- Starring: Penelope Stewart; Frank Whitten; Bill Kerr; Fiona Kay; Gordon Shields
- Cinematography: Alun Bollinger
- Edited by: Simon Reece
- Music by: Jack Body
- Release date: May 1984
- Running time: 86 minutes
- Country: New Zealand
- Language: English
- Budget: $2 million

Vigil is a 1984 New Zealand drama film directed and co-written by Vincent Ward, in his directorial debut. Starring Penelope Stewart, Frank Whitten, Bill Kerr, Fiona Kay, and Gordon Shields, it was the first New Zealand film invited to play in the competitive section (for the Palme d'Or) of the Cannes Film Festival.

== Plot ==
Eleven-year-old Toss lives on a remote farm in a valley somewhere deep in rural New Zealand with her father, mother and grandfather Birdie. When she witnesses her father's death while out herding sheep, she is shocked to see another man present, who then carries her father's body out of the bush. When that man moves onto the farm and begins a relationship with her mother, Toss sees him as an invader into her isolated world.

== Cast ==
- Penelope Stewart as Elizabeth Peers
- Frank Whitten as Ethan Ruir
- Bill Kerr as Birdie
- Fiona Kay as Lisa "Toss" Peers
- Gordon Shields as Justin Peers

== Production ==
Vincent Ward spent five years making Vigil, from pre-production to completion. Part of this was a lengthy pre-production process which involved him visiting hundreds of schools throughout New Zealand, looking for the right actor to play Toss. Similarly, Ward travelled all over New Zealand looking for a perfect setting before finding the isolated farm in Northern Taranaki where filming eventually took place. It was his debut feature film.

Producer and former collaborator Tim White, whom Ward had met while both were studying at the Ilam School of Fine Arts in the 1970s, was first assistant director on the film.

Ward co-wrote the screenplay with Graeme Tetley; cinematography was by Alun Bollinger; while production design was by Kai Hawkins.

== Reception ==
Upon its release, Vigil polarised critics, although generally it was reviewed positively.

One particularly negative critic, Robert Brown of The Monthly Film Bulletin, criticised the film for its "irritating music-and-effects track" and said it offered "grand themes [...] but without any notion of how they connect in reality". Others, however, offered far more favourable reviews. The Los Angeles Times described Vigil as "a film of elemental beauty and growing tension". The Washington Post gave a positive review, saying "In Vigil, Ward gives us imagery that plays like blasted poetry", while The Guardian called it "a work of astonishing, original force [...] the most distinctive New Zealand film ever to reach Britain".

== Nominations and awards ==
Vigil was the first New Zealand film invited to play in the competitive section of the Cannes Film Festival, where it was nominated for the Palme d'Or and received a standing ovation.

The film was nominated for awarded three awards at New Zealand's GOFTA Awards in 1986:

- Best Cinematography (Alun Bollinger)
- Best Original Screenplay (Vincent Ward)
- Best Production Design (Kai Hawkins)

At the 1984 1984 Chicago International Film Festival, Vigil was nominated for Gold Hugo for Best Feature Film.

The film won three Grand Prix (major prizes for best film) at three European film festivals:

- 1984 Madrid Film Festival (Spain)
- 1984 Prades International Film Festival (France)
- 1985 Imag Fic Festival (Spain)
