= Andy Anderson (actor) =

New Zealand actor

- Born: Neville Anderson; 18 July 1947 (age 79); Naenae, Lower Hutt, New Zealand
- Occupations: Musician, actor
- Years active: Early 1960s–present

Neville Anderson (born 18 July 1947) known professionally as Andy Anderson and also billed as Andy James, is a New Zealand musician and actor who primarily worked in Australia.

== Early life ==
Anderson was born in Naenae, Lower Hutt. He attended Naenae College, where he started playing in pop and rock and roll bands. At the age of 16, he relocated to Sydney to sing and drum in soul clubs for returned soldiers from Vietnam. In his early years, he also worked for Parks and Reserves.

== Career ==
=== Music ===
Anderson performed in several well-known Australian rock bands of the 1960s, in 1965 he joined the second lineup of famed Sydney garage punk group the Missing Links as lead vocalist, and he performed on the group's only album. After the demise of the Links, he moved to Melbourne and joined another radical punk-R&B outfit, Running Jumping Standing Still, which also included lead guitarist Doug Ford, who subsequently joined the Masters Apprentices. He sang with the avant-garde theatre group Red Mole for a time.

Anderson was well known for his outrageous stage performances but his wild lifestyle at the time took a heavy toll and in late 1966 he was hospitalised after suffering a brain haemorrhage onstage at Melbourne's Thumpin' Tum discothèque. After his recovery, Anderson formed two short-lived Melbourne bands, Andy James Asylum, followed by Mother Superior, before moving back to Sydney, where he joined the cast of the Australian production of Hair for a short time during 1970. This was followed by an 18-month stint with Sydney club band Southern Comfort, with co-vocalist Bobbi Marchini.

Anderson returned to his music career in the 2000s, recording a solo album called If I'd Known I'd Live This Long... in 2003. The same year, he participated in a reunion of Southern Comfort in Sydney.

In 2017, Anderson released his next album, Andersongs. In 2019, at the age 71, he was writing and making music, based in Palmerston North, New Zealand.

=== Film and television ===
After taking a hiatus from music, Anderson returned to working as a gardener, before turning his attention to acting. Upon sending out a photo and a written submission, Anderson attracted the attention of New Zealand's South Pacific Television. He joined the cast of Radio Waves in 1979, playing the part of a stoned DJ.

He then returned to Australia and began performing regularly on Australian TV from the mid-1970s to appear in The Sullivans, playing the role of Jim Sullivan. Regular roles in numerous television series followed, including Gloss as Matt Winter, Prisoner as Rick Manning, Fire as John Kennedy and a starring role in the talking-dog sitcom The Bob Morrison Show as Steve Morrison.

He had a prominent featured role as detective Lochie Renford in the first season of the acclaimed ABC TV police series Phoenix (1992–1993). In 2012 he had a recurring featured role as Vince, the minder of drug lord Harry Montebello, in the ABC crime drama series The Straits.

His guest appearances on television have included The Flying Doctors, Halifax f.p., A Country Practice, Xena: Warrior Princess, Hercules: The Legendary Journeys, Heartbreak High, Water Rats, All Saints, Blue Heelers, Neighbours, Stingers, Packed to the Rafters, Sea Patrol, McLeod's Daughters and The Man from Snowy River.

On film, Anderson is known for playing the role of John Livingston in the Hollywood film Anacondas: The Hunt for the Blood Orchid (2004) and also starred in House of Wax (2005) and Tracker (2010). He also had cameos in Swerve and Honk if You're Horny.

== Personal life ==
Anderson moved to Palmerston North in New Zealand with his wife Karen, prior to rebooting his music career. He has a daughter, Christal.

In 1966, during his early music career, Anderson was diagnosed with a brain aneurysm, and spent two weeks in hospital. His alcoholism saw him suffer from a bout of Pancreatitis, landing him in intensive care. He eventually went to rehabilitation for alcoholism in Hanmer Springs.

== Selected filmography ==
=== Film ===
Year	Title	Role	Note
1984	Trespasses	Albie Stone	Feature film
1988	New York's Finest	Mr Fullright	Direct-to-video film
1989	Il Magistrato	Tony	Film
1989	Gordon Bennett		Short film
1989	Zilch!	Lawyer	Feature film
1993	Ruby in Paradise	Nursey Family	Feature film
2000	Soledad	Parlorman	Short film
2002	Black and White	Norman Geiseman	Feature film
2002	Garage Days	Kevin	Feature film
2004	Anacondas: The Hunt for the Blood Orchid	John Livingston	Feature film
2005	House of Wax	Sheriff	Feature film
2006	Opal Dream	Nichols	Feature film
2010	Tracker	Bryce	Feature film
2011	Swerve	Ambulance Officer	Feature film
2011	Clicked	Brian	Short film
2012	Honk If You're Horny	Terry	Short film

=== Television ===
Year	Title	Role	Note
1978	Radio Waves	Paul Headley	62 episodes
1980–1983	The Sullivans	Jim Sullivan	Regular role
1983–1993	A Country Practice	Sean Thomas / Malcolm Roberts / Colin Townsend	5 episodes
1984	Prisoner	Rick Manning	38 episodes
1985	Robbery Under Arms	George	TV movie
1985	Roche	Tony	8 episodes
1986	The Great Bookie Robbery	Tony Lott	Miniseries, 3 episodes
1987	The Haunting of Barney Palmer	John Palmer	TV movie
1987–1990	Gloss	Matt Winter	Regular role
1989	The Shadow Trader	Don Santos	2 episodes
1989	The Magistrate	Tony	6 episodes
1989; 1990	The Flying Doctors	Jim Sexton / Peter	2 episodes
1990; 1992	The New Adventures of Black Beauty	Ship's Captain Pollock	
1990; 1992	Raider of the South Seas	Bill Taylor	TV series
1990–1996	G.P.	Gerald Butler / Peter Curtis / Warren Taylor	3 episodes
1991	The Boy from Andromeda	Tosh	6 episodes
1991	Gold: The World's Play	Henry Garrick	TV movie
1991	Gold: The Merchants of Venus	Henry Garrick	TV movie
1991	Gold: Frenchie's Gold	Henry Garrick	TV movie
1991	Gold: A Fistful of Gold	Henry Garrick	TV movie
1991–1992	Gold	Henry Garrick	16 episodes
1992	Phoenix	Lochie Renford / Ray Vann	13 episodes
1992	Marlin Bay	Steve Gannaway	
1993	Seven Deadly Sins	Colin	Miniseries, 1 episode
1994	Singapore Sling	Hooper	TV movie
1994	The Bob Morrison Show	Steve Morrison	26 episodes
1994	Snowy River: The McGregor Saga (aka The Man from Snowy River)	Harry Roebuck	1 episode
1994	Coverstory	Mike Jessop	
1995	High Tide	Brad Blair	1 episode
1995	Xena: Warrior Princess	Hesiod	1 episode
1995	Hercules: The Legendary Journeys	Zandar	1 episode
1995–1996	Fire	John 'Repo' Kennedy	6 episodes
1997	Police Rescue	Errol Crichton	1 episode
1997	Heartbreak High	Barry Peterson	7 episodes
1997	Wildside	Ted Murdoch	1 episode
1997	The Devil Game	John Devlin	TV movie
1999	Greenstone	Lamont	
1999	Duggan	Fraser	2 episodes
2000	Blue Heelers	John Gemes	1 episode
2000	Halifax f.p.	Ex-detective	Season 5, episode 1: "A Person of Interest"
2000	Neighbours	Mick Scully	8 episodes
2001–2004	Stingers	Frank Landis / Ed Cleaver	4 episodes
2004	Salem's Lot	Charlie Rhodes	Miniseries
2005	Home and Away	Kevin Baker	2 episodes
2007	All Saints	Lewid Dowd	2 episodes
2012	The Straits	Vince	10 episodes
2013	Packed to the Rafters	Jim Barton	4 episodes
2014	Janet King	Anthony Schaeffer	1 episode
2016	Dirty Laundry Live	Trevor Olyphant	

== Awards ==
Year	Work	Award	Category	Result
1982	The Sullivans	Logie Awards	Silver Logie for Best Supporting Actor in a Series	Won
2000	Halifax f.p.- A Person of Interest	Australian Film Institute Awards	Best Performance by an Actor in a Telefeature or Miniseries	Won
2012	Honk If You're Horny	Sorta Unofficial New Zealand Film Awards (The Moas)	Best Actor – Short Film	Won
2013	Honk If You're Horny	Show Me Shorts Film Festival (NZ)	Best Actor	Won
2013	Honk If You're Horny	Best Actors Film Festival (US)	Best Actor – Short	Won
