= Arriving Tuesday =

1985 New Zealand romantic comedy film

- Directed by: Richard Riddiford
- Written by: David Copeland; Richard Riddiford
- Produced by: Chris Hampson; Don Reynolds
- Starring: Judy McIntosh; Peter Hayden; Rawiri Paratene
- Cinematography: Murray Milne
- Edited by: John McWilliam
- Music by: Scott Calhoun
- Production companies: Cinepro; Walker Films Limited; New Zealand Film Commission
- Distributed by: Mirage Films
- Release date: 1986
- Running time: 84 minutes
- Country: New Zealand
- Language: English

Arriving Tuesday is a 1986 New Zealand romantic comedy film, directed by Richard Riddiford.

== Synopsis ==
A girl returns from Europe to her lover. After a tense reunion, they go on holiday where they meet a poetic Māori and the girl is undecided between the two men.

== Cast ==
- Judy McIntosh as Monica
- Peter Hayden as Nick
- Rawiri Paratene as Riki
- Heather Bolton as Jenny
- Marcin W. Chrobot as Jamie
- Sarah Peirse as Carol
- Lee Grant as Hotel Manageress
- Frank Whitten as Farmer
- Paki Cherrington as George
- Jon Smyth as Opossum Man
- Wayne Gillgren as Boatman
- Dody Potter as Taxi Driver

== Reviews ==
- 1986 London Film Festival.

== Awards ==
- 1987 National Mutual GOFTA Awards (New Zealand), Winner Film Award - Best Performance, Female in a Leading Role - Judy McIntosh, Winner Film Award - Best Performance, Female in a Supporting Role - Heather Bolton
