= Lee Grant (New Zealand actress) =

Actress & singer

Leonara Elizabeth Grant MBE (3 August 1931 – 22 July 2016), known professionally as Lee Grant or Miss Lee Grant, was an English-born New Zealand actress and singer.

Born in Carshalton, Surrey, England, on 3 August 1931, Grant moved to New Zealand in the 1960s and became a naturalised New Zealand citizen in December 1980. She was best known as a stage actress in Auckland from the 1960s onwards—being particularly associated with the Mercury Theatre—but also appeared with Chic Littlewood in cabaret performances, and in New Zealand's first television sitcom, Buck House, in 1974. Her film appearances included Trial Run (1984) starring Annie Whittle, Constance (1984), Arriving Tuesday (1986) and Zilch! (1989).

Grant was also a singer, although she suffered a recurrent throat problem and underwent a minor throat operation in 1969. She appeared in musicals at the Mercury including the 1975 production of Joseph and the Amazing Technicolor Dreamcoat, and as Velma Kelly in Chicago.

As well as singing and acting, Grant pursued a career as a choreographer, and was awarded a grant of $4000 by the Arts Council for a study trip to Canada.

In the 1991 Queen's Birthday Honours, Grant was appointed a Member of the Order of the British Empire, for services to the theatre.

She moved to Perth, Western Australia, in 1994, but returned to New Zealand on a number of occasions to appear on stage or in television productions, including Three Tall Women with the Auckland Theatre Company in 1996, and the television drama, Coalface, in 1997, during which she was injured and subsequently required a hip replacement.

Grant died in Perth on 22 July 2016, aged 84.
