= Nathan Riggs =

Fictional character from Grey's Anatomy

- Grey's Anatomy character
- First appearance: "The Me Nobody Knows" (12.06)
- Last appearance: "Danger Zone" (14.05)
- Created by: Shonda Rhimes
- Portrayed by: Martin Henderson

In-universe information
- Title(s): MD, FACS
- Occupation: Attending Cardiothoracic surgeon at Grey Sloan Memorial Hospital (former); Cardiothoracic surgeon in the United States Army (former)
- Significant others: Megan Hunt (ex-fiancée); Felicia Philips (one-night-stand); Meredith Grey (ex-lover)
- Children: Farouk Shami (adoptive son, by Megan)
- Origin: New Zealand

Nathan Riggs, MD, FACS, is a fictional character from the medical drama television series Grey's Anatomy, which airs on the American Broadcasting Company (ABC) in the United States. The character was created by series producer Shonda Rhimes and is portrayed by actor Martin Henderson. He was introduced in the Season 12 episode "The Me Nobody Knows" as a cardiothoracic surgeon who had worked overseas with April Kepner (Sarah Drew) during her time in Jordan. After bringing a patient to Grey-Sloan Memorial, Riggs begins working there as an attending under Maggie Pierce (Kelly McCreary), the Chief of Cardiothoracic Surgery.

While at the hospital, Nathan develops a romantic relationship with Meredith Grey (Ellen Pompeo), who is grieving the loss of her husband, Derek Shepherd (Patrick Dempsey). Their relationship becomes complicated when Nathan's long-missing fiancée, Megan Hunt (Abigail Spencer), is found alive and brought back home. After Megan's return, Nathan decides to rekindle his relationship with her, and they begin a new life together with her son in Los Angeles. Nathan makes his final appearance in the Season 14 episode "Danger Zone". However, it is later revealed in Season 18 by Megan that the couple eventually broke up.

== Storylines ==
Nathan Riggs is introduced in the sixth episode of Grey's Anatomy's twelfth season, "The Me Nobody Knows", as a new cardiothoracic attending at Grey-Sloan Memorial Hospital. It is soon revealed that Nathan and Owen Hunt (Kevin McKidd) had been friends, but their friendship ended acrimoniously. The cause of their feud is eventually disclosed: Owen’s sister, Megan Hunt (Abigail Spencer), who had been engaged to Nathan, discovered his infidelity before running off and being kidnapped. Megan was presumed dead for 10 years, and Owen blamed Nathan for her disappearance. Over time, however, Nathan and Owen learn to work together and eventually mend their friendship.

Towards the end of season 12, Nathan and Meredith Grey (Ellen Pompeo) have a one-night stand in the back of her car. Although they agree it was a one-time thing, Meredith struggles to move on from her late husband, Derek Shepherd (Patrick Dempsey). Complicating matters, Meredith’s half-sister, Maggie Pierce (Kelly McCreary), develops a crush on Nathan. Despite these obstacles, Nathan continues to pursue Meredith, and they eventually enter into a relationship. However, just as their relationship becomes serious, Megan is found alive in the Season 13 finale. Understanding the situation, Meredith encourages Nathan to reunite with Megan, stating that she would have done the same if Derek had returned.

Nathan and Megan initially struggle to resume their relationship, with Megan suspecting that Nathan is still in love with Meredith. However, they reconcile when Nathan brings Megan's son, Farouk, from Iraq, proving his commitment to her. In the episode "Danger Zone", Nathan, Megan, and Farouk move to Los Angeles to start their life together.

=== Departure ===
Nathan makes his final appearance in the Season 14 episode "Danger Zone", marking the departure of actor Martin Henderson from the series. Henderson joined the cast in 2015, and his character was initially conceived as a love interest for Meredith. Shonda Rhimes announced Henderson’s exit via Twitter, stating, "I loved that we were able to give Riggs a happy ending worthy of his character and talent. As for Martin, this is not an ending for our relationship. He has been part of the Shondaland family since the pilot of Inside The Box and he will always be family. I can't wait to find a new project to work with him on in the future."

In an interview with Deadline, Henderson revealed that his departure was due to a storytelling decision, as he had signed a "short-term contract." He added, "This [was] my final year so I was expecting Nathan's storyline to be wrapped up."

Henderson shared his thoughts on his relationships with both Megan and Meredith

I think there was clearly something for Nathan in those relationships. Feelings like that, I don't think they go away. The nature of his previous commitment to Megan and his feelings around that put him in a horrible state of having to choose between two people he cares about, but honoring his commitment to Megan and following through on that is the right thing to do. It doesn't negate his feelings for Meredith. The complications of Meredith's emotions, the loss of Derek and moving on from that still plagues her. And there's as much ambiguity around all those feelings. The two of them found each other and that provided good drama. I feel bad for fans who were keen on Meredith and Nathan making it, and not being privy to where each character would go. It's hard to hear those outpourings from those who didn't know it was going to end up like this. But it makes for nice drama and it's something that Shonda does brilliantly: Dashing people's hopes and expectations. That's why the show continues to be successful. You can't predict what will happen to people at any time.
