= Strangers (1989 TV series) =

- Written by: Margaret Mahy
- Directed by: Peter Sharp
- Starring: Martin Henderson; Hamish McFarlane; Amber McWilliams; Sonia Pivac
- Composer: Matthew Brown
- Country of origin: New Zealand
- Original language: English
- No. of seasons: 1
- No. of episodes: 6

Production
- Producer: Chris Bailey
- Running time: 24 minutes
- Production company: TVNZ

Original release
- Release: June 18 – July 23, 1989

Strangers is a New Zealand mystery drama television series for children. Written by Margaret Mahy, it featured four children who created a secret club named Zan-Em-Mor-Kel, a named derived from their names, Zane, Emma, Morgan and Kelsey. The character of Kelsey was deaf and she was played by Sonia Privac who was deaf since birth.

== Cast ==
- Martin Henderson as Zane Chandler
- Amber McWilliams as Emma Chandler
- Hamish McFarlane as Morgan Perrine
- Sonia Pivac as Kelsey Perrine
- Joel Tobeck as Ludo

== Broadcast history ==
Strangers debuted in New Zealand on 18 June 1989 on Two. Later that year it aired in England on BBC1 beginning on 20 September and was repeated on BBC2 in 1992. In Australia the ABC broadcast it beginning on 28 August 1991 to coincide with Deafness Awareness Week.

== Reception ==
Margaret Geddes, in the Age's Green Guide, called it "special for a number of reasons" and said "The children in Strangers are exceptional, both for their characterisations (which, like the children's families, are multi-faceted) and their acting." The Sydney Morning Herald's Paul Pottinger calls it "intelligent, quality junior television" and writes "It boasts a good young cast, none of whom are more impressive than seven-year-old Sonia Pivac as Kelsey, whose story Strangers essentially is."
