= Hamish McFarlane =

New Zealand actor

- Occupation: Actor
- Notable work: Strangers; The Navigator: A Medieval Odyssey

Hamish McFarlane is a New Zealand actor. He played lead roles of Morgan in TV series Strangers and Griffin in film The Navigator: A Medieval Odyssey. For the latter he won the 1989 New Zealand Film Award for Best Male Performance and was nominated for 1988 AFI Award for Best Actor in a Leading Role. He was nominated at the 1993 New Zealand Film and Television Award for the Best Guest Performance for a role on Shortland Street. He also appear in the TV movie The Grasscutter.
