= Trespasses (film) =

- Directed by: Peter Sharp
- Written by: Maurice Gee and Tom Finlayson
- Produced by: Tom Finlayson; Dean Hill
- Starring: Emma Piper; Patrick McGoohan
- Cinematography: Leon Narbey
- Edited by: David Coulson
- Music by: Bernie Allen
- Production company: Finlayson-Hill Productions
- Release date: 1984
- Running time: 101 min
- Country: New Zealand
- Language: English
- Budget: $180,000

Trespasses is a 1984 New Zealand film. It was directed by Peter Sharp, written by Maurice Gee and starred Patrick McGoohan and Emma Piper. It was a spin-off of Mortimer's Patch. In the UK it was released as Omen of Evil.

== Synopsis ==
A woman fleeing a controlling father joins a commune where she encounters a different form of control.

== Cast ==
- Patrick McGoohan as Fred Wells
- Emma Piper as Katie Wells
- Andy Anderson as Albie Stone
- Terence Cooper as Doug Mortimer
- Frank Whitten as Stan Gubbins
- Sean Duffy as Dave Gilchrist
- Don Selwyn as Bob Storey

== Reception ==
Helen Martin in New Zealand film, 1912-1996 wrote "Trespasses is a psychological drama about the emotional journey of a woman dominated by fanatical, possessive men. The film is as hostile to the commune's hedonistic philosophy as it is to Fred's soulless religion, using Stan's jealous partner to show the free love philosophy as hurtful and destructive." Hans Petrovic in the Press writes "What we are given is the story of a man's suffering and destruction, while he makes his daughter suffer just as much. Over all, the film is tense but not terrifying, well told but not riveting." William Dart from Rip It Up noted "What is good about Trespasses is very good indeed. One admires Leon Narbey's fine photography of the New Zealand terrain, although once again the film itself almost gets upstaged by the photogenic setting." He continues "On the other hand, Patrick McGoohan's characterisation of the father has its unconvincing moments, particularly in the last thirty minutes of the film and this is a serious flaw when he is the crux of the whole plot. And then there is the script itself, which chooses to relinquish character development in favour of some fairly laboured plotting - the deadly scenes with Terence Cooper and Don Selwyn in the local constabulary are too much in the shadow of Mortimer's Patch for their own good. Never Repeats Podcast criticised the film says while there is nothing in the film that is "actively" bad there is also nothing that is good. Martin Blythe from Listener praised the visuals.
