= Catherine McGoohan =

British-American actress (born 1952)

- Born: 31 May 1952 (age 73); Westminster, London, England
- Spouse: Cleve Landsberg
- Children: 2
- Father: Patrick McGoohan

Catherine McGoohan (born 31 May 1952) is a British-American actress.

== Early life ==
McGoohan is the eldest daughter of Irish-American actor Patrick McGoohan and actress Joan Drummond. She has two younger sisters.

== Career ==
McGoohan appeared in films and television series such as Something's Gotta Give, The Girl Next Door, Elizabethtown, General Hospital and Gilmore Girls. She appeared alongside her father in Columbo: Ashes to Ashes (1998), which he also directed.

== Personal life ==
She moved to the United States with her parents and sisters, having previously lived in both Britain and Switzerland, in the late 1960s. She is married to film producer Cleve Landsberg; she has two daughters and a grandson.

== Filmography ==
=== Film ===
Year	Title	Role	Notes
1984	Savage Streets	Store Manager	
1992	Blind Vision	Gloria Byers	
1999	The Other Sister	Country Club Lady #1	
2000	Farewell, My Love	Mrs. Fauve	
2000	Family Jewels	Lindsay	
2002	Laurel Canyon	Mrs. Elliot	
2002	Essence of Echoes	Mrs. Moorehouse	
2003	Something's Gotta Give	Harry's Old Flame	
2004	The Girl Next Door	Mrs. Peterson	
2005	Elizabethtown	Assistant	
2006	Glory Road	Esther Rupp	
2006	The Ultimate Gift	Ruth Stevens	
2007	Evan Almighty	Committee Member	
2009	Imagine That	Mrs. Pressman	
2010	Redemption Road	Annie	
2010	Beginners	1978 Older Woman	
2017	In My Mind	—N/a	Documentary

=== Television ===
Year	Title	Role	Notes
1985	Scarecrow and Mrs. King	Pamela Densmore	Episode: "We're Off to See the Wizard"
1986	A Time to Triumph	Nurse	Television film
1986	Of Pure Blood	Pru	Television film
1987	The Return of the Six Million Dollar Man and the Bionic Woman	Receptionist	Television film
1991	An Inconvenient Woman	AA Leader	2 episodes
1993, 1999	Acapulco H.E.A.T.	Natasha / Sister	2 episodes
1995	Liz: The Elizabeth Taylor Story	—N/a	Television film
1996	The Big Easy	Caroline	Episode: "That Voodoo That You Do"
1997	Beyond Belief: Fact or Fiction	Beverly Stone	Episode: "Secret of the Family Tomb"
1998	Tracey Takes On...	Wardrobe Lady	Episode: "Hollywood"
1998	Columbo	Rita	Episode: "Ashes to Ashes"
2001	General Hospital	Woman on Cruise	Episode dated 14 December 2001
2004	Gilmore Girls	Carol Stiles	Episode: "Tick, Tick, Tick, Boom!"
2010	FlashForward	Dr. Candace Weaver	Episode: "Goodbye Yellow Brick Road"
