= The Moment (2013 film) =

- Directed by: Jane Weinstock
- Written by: Gloria Norris; Jane Weinstock
- Produced by: Allan Jones; Jane Weinstock; James Welling; Gloria Norris; Mary Jane Skalski; Julia Eisenman
- Starring: Jennifer Jason Leigh; Martin Henderson; Alia Shawkat; Meat Loaf
- Cinematography: James Laxton
- Edited by: Stan Salfas; Ruben Sebban
- Music by: Nathan Larson
- Production company: Momentous Development
- Distributed by: Dada Films
- Release date: April 21, 2013 (Tribeca Film Festival)
- Running time: 92 minutes
- Country: United States
- Language: English

The Moment is a 2013 American psychological thriller film directed by Jane Weinstock, written by Gloria Norris and Weinstock, and starring Jennifer Jason Leigh, Martin Henderson, Alia Shawkat, and Meat Loaf. Leigh plays a war photographer who, suffering from PTSD, becomes unsure whether she is responsible for her ex-boyfriend's disappearance.

== Plot ==
Having previously broken up with her boyfriend John, photographer Lee returns to John's house to retrieve her cameras. There, she discovers mounting evidence that John has not been home for a long time. Worried, she contacts the police, and Sergeant Goodman takes her report, though he suggests that John may simply not want to contact her. At an exhibition of her work, her daughter Jessie rebukes her efforts at reconciliation, and Lee mistakes a stranger for John. Haunted by her experiences in Somalia, Lee experiences a mental breakdown and leaves the bathroom completely naked. Her ex-husband and daughter escort her out and have her committed to an upscale psychiatric hospital.

At the hospital, Dr. Bloom expresses skepticism at Lee's insistence that she has killed John. Instead, Dr. Bloom suggests that Lee may have created a false memory to cope with the stress in her life. Peter, a defense attorney who blames himself for the subsequent murder of a legal aide by a murderer he helped to free, offers to put his office at her disposal. Lee is stunned by the resemblance between John and Peter, but tells Dr. Bloom that they are polar opposites in personality and demeanor. Flashbacks and psychotherapy sessions reveal that Lee and John met in a hospital after he was involved in a car accident, and she was the victim of a suicide bombing.

Peter hires a private investigator to research John's disappearance, and further flashbacks fill in details about John and Lee's romance. Intrigued by John's background as a wrongly-convicted felon, Lee invites him to pose for her as a model. Although wary of more attention from photographers, he agrees, and they begin to develop a bond. At the same time, Jessie develops a resentment toward their growing closeness. Later flashbacks reveal repressed memories that John had briefly dated Jessie before becoming involved with Lee. Furious, Lee breaks up with John, and Jessie wishes that her mother had died in the suicide bombing.

Peter, Lee, and Jessie all grow closer to each other and begin to unravel more drama. Jessie apologizes to her mother and admits that she knew there was an attraction between John and her mother, but Jessie still chose to pursue John. She swears her mother to secrecy, and Lee promises never to tell Peter. Meanwhile, Peter and Jessie go hiking together, and Lee panics when they do not return in time for a scheduled dinner. Peter's brief disappearance conjures all sorts of conspiracies in Lee's mind, and Sgt. Goodman expresses suspicion that either Lee or Jessie may be John's murderer after he finds a bracelet owned by Lee and worn by Jessie. After Peter cuts short an interview by Lee with the police, he reveals that he is dating Jessie.

Peter's research reveals evidence that John may still be alive. However, it turns out to be Thomas, John's houseguest, using John's credit card. Peter alerts Sgt. Goodman, who searches the premises and finds John's decomposing body and a suicide note. Freed of suspicion from both herself and the police, Lee begins to recover and soon leaves the psychiatric hospital; at the same time, she realizes that Peter and John look nothing alike, and the perceived similarities in appearance were only her imagination. Although she has promised Jessie to stay closer to home, she takes another job in the Middle East and asks Jessie to understand. Jessie finally accepts that her mother is a war photographer and gives her blessing. When Lee returns to active work, she is suddenly struck by the fear that all the positive moments in her life may be a false memory.

== Cast ==
- Jennifer Jason Leigh as Lee
- Martin Henderson as John / Peter
  - Alexander Fazel as Real Peter
- Alia Shawkat as Jessie Jamil
- Marianne Jean-Baptiste as Dr. Bloom
- Meat Loaf as Sergeant Goodman
- Alessandra Torresani as Emma
- Navid Negahban as Malik Jamil
- Xavier Jimenez-March as Thomas
- Kerrie Keane as Adele
- Anna Diop as Hawa

== Production ==
The original idea came from an Edith Wharton novel which Weinstock was unable to option. She and co-writer Norris then took the basic premise and went in new directions. Financing was difficult for Weinstock, as the film's genre-crossing made it a difficult sell to studios, who were more interested in a straight psychological thriller. The global recession also worked against them; in order to reduce budget costs, the production was moved to California. The title refers to both the moment a photograph is taken and the moment when decisive action is taken. Weinstock did not base the characters or situations on personal experience, but she did relate to aspects, such as complicated mother-daughter relationships and bad romantic relationships. Leigh was cast when Weinstock sent the script to her manager; Leigh expressed enthusiasm for the script, and the rest of the cast joined once she was attached. Weinstock wanted to put together the film non-sequentially to represent Lee's fractured memories. Weinstock cited the film's editing as the biggest challenge, as the non-linear story allowed them to go in many different directions; at one point, they changed the entire structure of the film.

== Release ==
The Moment premiered at the 2013 Tribeca Film Festival. It was released in New York on June 6, 2014, and in Los Angeles on June 20, 2014.

== Reception ==
Rotten Tomatoes, a review aggregator, reports that 11% of nine surveyed critics gave the film a positive review; the average rating was 1.98/10. Metacritic rated it 22/100 based on eight reviews. Ronnie Scheib of Variety wrote, "Jennifer Jason Leigh is as radiant and uncompromising as ever in this convoluted and repetitive psychological thriller". Frank Scheck of The Hollywood Reporter wrote, "Although Jennifer Jason Leigh delivers a compelling turn, this Hitchcock-style drama ties itself in too many knots." Ben Kenigsberg of The New York Times compared it to the work of David Lynch, but said that the film's conceit "seems too pat to undergird a work of genuine surrealism". Betsy Sharkey of The Los Angeles Times called it "more muddled than the mind and the maze it is caught up in." Sam Weisberg of The Village Voice called it an "electrifying" psychological thriller that "plays slightly like Vertigo with the gender reversed". Diego Costa of Slant Magazine rated it zero stars and called it a "vacuous exercise in genre emulation". Amy R. Handler of Film Threat rated it 3.5/5 stars and wrote, "Though some may find The Moment's non-linear format needlessly difficult, and its story too much like an evening soap opera, I really enjoyed the movie." Handler also compared it to Lynch's work.
