= Vincent Ward (director) =

New Zealand film director, screenwriter and artist

Vincent Ward ONZM
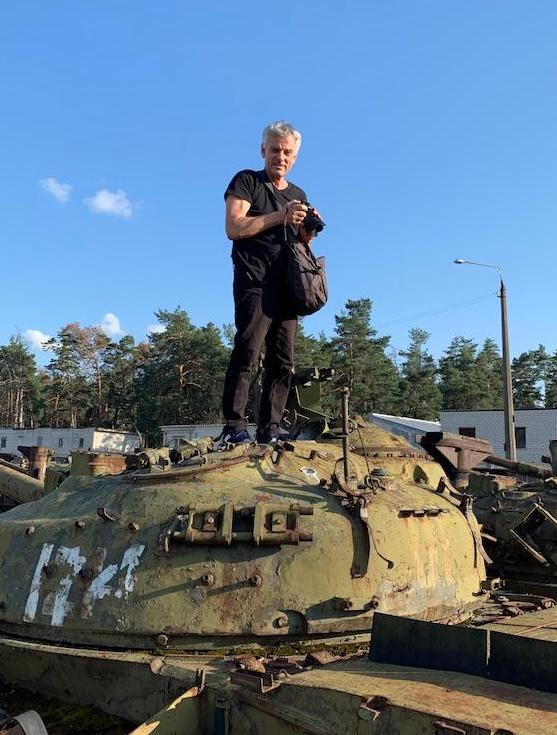
- Ward in 2018
- Born: 16 February 1956 (age 70); Greytown, New Zealand
- Years active: 1978–present

Vincent Ward (born 16 February 1956) is a New Zealand film director, screenwriter and artist.

== Life and career ==
Vincent Ward was born on 16 February 1956 near Greytown, New Zealand. He attended Ilam School of Fine Arts at the University of Canterbury in Christchurch, New Zealand where he received a Diploma in Fine Arts (with Honours) in 1981. In 2014 the University of Canterbury awarded him an Honorary Doctorate in Fine Arts and an adjunct professorship.

His debut short feature, A State of Siege, adapted a novel by Janet Frame. It was released theatrically and reviewed by The Los Angeles Times who described it as, 'Rigorously constructed with one exquisitely composed image following another ... film becomes poetry'. The film won a Special Jury Prize at the Miami Film Festival 1978 and a Golden Hugo Award at the Chicago Film Festival that same year.

Ward lived in remote Te Urewera with a Tūhoe woman named Puhi and her adult schizophrenic son Niki and made a documentary called In Spring One Plants Alone, which won the 1982 Grand Prix at Cinéma du Réel (Paris), and a Silver Hugo at the Chicago Film Festival.

Ward's next three films, Vigil (1984), The Navigator: A Medieval Odyssey (1988) and Map of the Human Heart (1993) were the first films by a New Zealander to be officially selected ‘in competition’ at the Cannes Film Festival. Between them they garnered close to 30 national and international awards (including the Grand Prix at festivals in Italy, Spain, Germany, France and the United States).

Vigil (1984), follows an imaginative, solitary child living on a remote farm and is partly inspired by Ward's own rural upbringing in the Wairarapa. It was produced by John Maynard and shot in Taranaki. Child actor Fiona Kay played the central role.

Ward's second feature, a fantasy-adventure film, The Navigator: A Medieval Odyssey (1988), was inspired by an experience he had in Germany. He recounts attempting to cross the autobahn on foot and ending up dodging traffic. The experience made such an impression on him, it was the key image that sparked the idea for the film. The Navigator follows a group of 14th-century Cumbrian villagers who tunnel through the earth, and find themselves in modern-day Auckland. Ward says “what I wanted to do was look at the 20th Century through medieval eyes, its as if the demons of our contemporary world, our technological monsters of destruction, could be foreseen in the nightmares of medieval men”. Rolling Stone's review hailed it as “A visionary film of rare courage and imperishable heart.” The film won the Grand Prix at four film festivals including; Sitges Film Festival, Fanta Film Festival, and Oporto Film Festival 1998/89. And took home Best Film and Best Director at both the Australian and New Zealand film industry awards in 1989.

In 1990, Ward wrote a treatment for Alien 3, and was originally slated to direct it before being replaced by David Fincher, while part of his treatment was used in the film, thus receiving a "story by" credit in the end. The heart of his original script, known as 'the monks in space' version, was however not captured in the final film and has since been recognised by the London Times Online, who in 2008 gave it the top spot on their list of 'greatest sci-fi movies never made'.

Ward's next film Map of the Human Heart (1993) charts a relationship between an Inuk boy, a Métis girl and a visiting British cartographer. Ward and his co-writer Louis Nowra spent time travelling and researching the project together in Canada and Vincent went on to travel extensively in the Arctic before they began writing the script. Ward suffered minor frostbite whilst location scouting in the Arctic that was still visible throughout the shoot. The film stars Jason Scott Lee, Anne Parillaud and Patrick Bergin, and features Jeanne Moreau and John Cusack in minor roles. It was produced by Tim Bevan and Ward, and it was screened as a work in progress at Cannes Film Festival in 1992, it was later nominated for best film at the Australian Film Institute Awards. American reviewer, Roger Ebert, said in his review: "The best movies seem to reinvent themselves as they move along, not drawing from worn-out sources, and “Map of the Human Heart” is one of the year’s best films."

In the 1990s Ward spent several years in and out of Hollywood, where he developed multiple projects before he signed on to direct What Dreams May Come (1998) a screenplay adapted by Ronald Bass from Richard Matheson's 1978 novel. What Dreams May Come was released in the United States on 2,600 screens and starred Robin Williams, Annabella Sciorra, Cuba Gooding Jr. and Max von Sydow. It reached US$71 million in theatrical sales and performed strongly in the video market. The film was nominated for Best Production Design and Best Visual Effects at the 1999 Academy Awards and won an Oscar for visual effects. It continues to be popular with audiences scoring 84% on Rotten Tomatoes.

The 2003 epic, The Last Samurai was based on a project Ward spent four years developing with the film's producers. Eventually, after Ward approached several directors, including Francis Ford Coppola and Peter Weir, he got Edward Zwick to helm the film. Ward was an executive producer of the film.

During his time in Hollywood, Ward became interested in acting and trained under acting coach Penny Allen. He had a small part in Mike Figgis’ film Leaving Las Vegas (1995), and a larger role in Figgis’ next film One Night Stand (1997). He was given one of the leading role in a US independent feature film The Shot (1996), and a role in Geoff Murphy's film Spooked (2004).

In 2005, he returned to New Zealand and made River Queen. Starring Samantha Morton, Kiefer Sutherland, Stephen Rea, Temuera Morrison and Cliff Curtis.

Rain of the Children followed in 2008, wherein Ward retells the story of Puhi, the elderly Tuhoe woman who was the subject of his earlier documentary In Spring One Plants Alone. Rain of the Children won the Grand Prix at Era New Horizons Film Festival. The film was nominated for best director and won best composer at the Qantas Film and TV Awards in New Zealand. Vincent Ward was also nominated for best director at the Australian Directors Guild Awards.

Ward has had 2 full retrospectives of his films. In 1984 at Germany's Hof International Film Festival and in 2008 at Poland's Era New Horizons Film Festival.

The Boston Globe has called Vincent Ward "one of film's great image makers", while Roger Ebert, one of America's foremost film critics, hailed him as "a true visionary."

== Painting and photography ==
Since 2010 Ward has launched a second career as a painter and video artist. In 2012 he had his first major solo show, Breath, at New Zealand's cutting edge public gallery, the Govett-Brewster Art Gallery/Len Lye Centre in New Plymouth. This was followed by two other public gallery showings in Auckland and a solo pavilion at the 9th Shanghai Biennale 2012.

Ward received an honorary Doctorate in Fine Arts from the University of Canterbury (2014) and an adjunct professorship. In 2015 he had a guest professorship at the China Academy of Art, in Hanzhou, as well as a residency at the Shanghai University School of Fine Arts.

Ward is represented in New Zealand by Milford Galleries and by Void Gallery in Melbourne Australia.

Art writer and reviewer Anthony Byrt (Art Forum) described the work as "intense... stunning... virtuosic" and said "Ward has never shied away from the truth: he digs and digs until he gets somewhere other filmmakers and artists don't often visit: a psychic space where violence, memory, myth, sex and religion mingle in a landscape scarred by history."

Rhana Devenport, director Govett-Brewster Art Gallery, wrote in her catalog for the exhibition: Ward's ongoing concerns with metamorphosis, falling, light, fear, memory, darkness and the transformative moment have led him to create a series of vast, physically imposing works that delve into other-worldly landscapes and transcendent states, to evocations of loss, redemption and unconscious realms.

== Filmography ==
Short film

Year	Title	Director	Writer	Producer
1978	A State of Siege	Yes	Yes	No
1981	In Spring One Plants Alone	Yes	Yes	Yes

Feature film

Year	Title	Director	Writer	Producer
1984	Vigil	Yes	Yes	No
1988	The Navigator: A Medieval Odyssey	Yes	Yes	No
1992	Alien 3	No	Story	No
1993	Map of the Human Heart	Yes	Yes	Yes
1998	What Dreams May Come	Yes	No	No
2005	River Queen	Yes	Yes	No
2008	Rain of the Children	Yes	Yes	Yes

Executive producer

- The Last Samurai (2003)

== Bibliography ==
- The Navigator, A Medieval Odyssey. Screenplay (Faber and Faber: 1989).
- Edge of the Earth: Stories and Images from the Antipodes (Auckland: Heinemann Reed, 1990).
- The Past Awaits, people, images, film. Large-format, full-colour photographic book of images and stories (published in New Zealand by Craig Potton Publishing, 2010).
- Inhale | Exhale. Large format. Full color reproductions of Vincent Wards artwork from his 2011–2012 exhibitions (Breath Govett Brewster Art Gallery, Inhale | Exhale Gus Fisher Gallery and Pah Homestead, Auckland Station Shanghai Biennale) (Ron Sang Publications, 2012).

== Awards and honours ==
Australian Film Institute

Year	Title	Category	Result
1988	The Navigator: A Medieval Odyssey	Best Direction	Won
1993	Map of the Human Heart	Best Direction	Nominated

Cannes Film Festival

Year	Title	Category	Result
1984	Vigil	Palme d'Or	Nominated
1988	The Navigator: A Medieval Odyssey	Palme d'Or	Nominated
