= Hotspur =

Hotspur may refer to:

== Arts and entertainment ==
- The Hotspur, a former British boys' comic
- Hotspur, a three-issue Eclipse comic book series
- HMS Hotspur, a fictional Royal Navy ship in the novel Hornblower and the Hotspur
- MCRN Hotspur, a fictional warship in the science-fiction novel series The Expanse
- Hotspur, a fictional family in the novel Sir Harry Hotspur of Humblethwaite by Anthony Trollope

== Football clubs ==
- Tottenham Hotspur F.C., based in Tottenham, London, England
- Holyhead Hotspur F.C., based in Holyhead, Anglesey, Wales
- Pietà Hotspurs F.C., based in Pietà, Malta
- Victoria Hotspurs F.C., based in Victoria, Malta
- Linton Hotspur F.C., based in West Linton, Scotland

== Military and transportation ==
- HMS Hotspur, several British ships
- USS Hotspur (AP-102), a US Navy transport ship
- General Aircraft Hotspur, a Second World War British glider
- Hawker Hotspur, a Second World War British fighter
- Hotspur, British Railways class 7 "Britannia" locomotive 70011
- Land Rover Hotspur, an armoured vehicle used by police in Northern Ireland

== Places ==
- Hotspur, Victoria, a locality in Australia
- Hotspur, Ontario, a community in Canada

== Other uses ==
- Henry Percy (Hotspur) (1364–1403), English knight nicknamed Hotspur
