= The Shadow Trader =

New Zealand television mini series

- Written by: Sue McCauley
- Story by: Debra Daley
- Directed by: Wayne Tourell
- Starring: Annie Whittle; Miranda Harcourt; James Faulkner; Peter Elliott
- Composer: Dave McArtney
- Country of origin: New Zealand
- Original language: English
- No. of seasons: 1
- No. of episodes: 2

Production
- Producer: Finola Dwyer
- Editors: Christine Munro; Roger Grant
- Running time: 90 minutes

Original release
- Release: July 9 – July 11, 1989

The Shadow Trader is a 1989 New Zealand television mini series. Shot over a period of 11 weeks, it is a mystery thriller set around high finance and the racing industry. Director Wayne Tourell said that it was "the first television drama shot in New Zealand solely on single camera video, à la film style."

== Cast ==
- Annie Whittle as Tammy Costello
- Miranda Harcourt as Joanna McCarthy
- James Faulkner as David Constance
- Dorothy McKegg as Lillian Parker
- Peter Elliott as Chris Simmonds
- Andy Anderson as Don Santos
