= Martin Henderson =

New Zealand actor (born 1974)

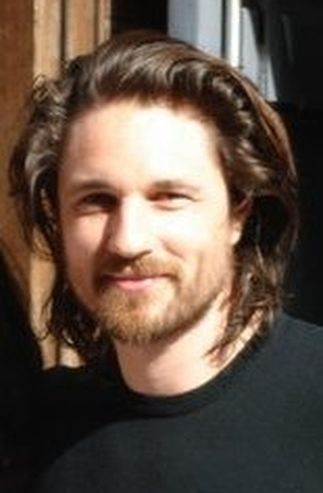
- Henderson in 2006
- Born: 8 October 1974 (age 51); Auckland, New Zealand
- Education: Birkenhead Primary; Northcote Intermediate Westlake Boys High
- Occupation: Actor
- Years active: 1989–present

Martin Henderson (born 8 October 1974) is a New Zealand actor. He is known for his roles on the American medical drama series Off the Map as Dr. Ben Keeton (2011), the medical drama series Grey's Anatomy as Dr. Nathan Riggs (2015–2017), the Netflix romantic drama Virgin River as Jack Sheridan (2019–present), and for his performances as Noah Clay in the horror film The Ring (2002) and Wayne Gilroy in the slasher film X (2022). In his home country, he is known for his teenage role as Stuart Neilson in the soap opera Shortland Street (1992–1995).

== Early life ==
Henderson was born in Auckland to Ian and Veronica Henderson. They divorced when he was five. He began acting at the age of thirteen, appearing in Strangers, a local television production. He attended Birkenhead Primary Northcote Intermediate and Westlake Boys High schools. He played rugby as a flanker and his team won the championship in 1990 and 1991. He turned down going to study at university when he was 17, in favour of acting. He initially considered studying science and business.

== Career ==
=== Early work ===
In 1989 he played Zane, one of the leads in Strangers on Network Two and in 1991 he played Jack Taylor in the series Raider of the South Seas. At age 17, in 1992, Henderson starred as Stuart Neilson in the New Zealand prime-time soap opera Shortland Street. He played the role until 1995. Shortland Street became New Zealand's longest-running drama and soap opera. He subsequently lived in Australia for three years and appeared in a number of Australian films and television productions including Echo Point and Home and Away.

=== Move to the United States ===
Henderson moved to the United States in 1997 to pursue a career in Hollywood films and to train in a two-year program at the Neighborhood Playhouse in New York City with a student visa. To pay the tuition, he took a job at night as a restaurant food runner. While at school, he starred as Hamlet in the off-Broadway play Ophelia Thinks Harder. He left the school halfway through the two-year course and moved to Los Angeles.

Heath Ledger helped him financially during a period of numerous auditions without securing any role. Henderson first landed a voice over part in a Fanta commercial, speaking with an Australian accent. In 1999, he appeared in Kick, for which he was nominated for an AACTA Award for Best Actor in a Supporting Role in 2000. After more than a year unsuccessfully auditioning for film roles in Los Angeles, in 2001 he was cast in a supporting role in the John Woo-directed war film Windtalkers. In 2002, Henderson starred opposite Naomi Watts in the horror film The Ring. Following the box office success of the film, he was cast as Drew in Perfect Opposites, and subsequently as the lead character in the biker film Torque, released in early 2004. Later that year, he starred opposite Aishwarya Rai in the British romantic film Bride and Prejudice and appeared in Britney Spears' "Toxic" music video. In 2005, he appeared in the award-winning Little Fish starring Cate Blanchett. In 2006, Henderson received rave reviews in London's West End in a theatre production of Fool for Love with Juliette Lewis.

He was set to star alongside Jordana Brewster in the television series adapted from the 2005 film Mr. & Mrs. Smith. However, the series was not picked up by any network. In 2006, he appeared in the movie Flyboys. He also appeared in a commercial for the 2008 Cadillac CTS, and the House episode "Painless". In 2010, Henderson was cast in Grey's Anatomy creator Shonda Rhimes' short-lived television series Off the Map as a New Zealand doctor. In 2014, he starred in the multi-platform Australian drama television series Secrets & Lies and in the SundanceTV drama series The Red Road.

In 2015, Henderson appeared in Everest, with Jake Gyllenhaal. In June that year, he joined the cast of Grey's Anatomy, as a potential love interest for series lead Ellen Pompeo's Meredith Grey, making his first appearance in November, as Dr. Nathan Riggs. The actor exited two years later, his final appearance in October 2017. Henderson told Deadline that his departure was a storytelling-based decision, adding, "This [was] my final year so I was expecting Nathan’s storyline to be wrapped up." In 2016, he starred in the film Miracles from Heaven opposite Jennifer Garner.

Since 2019, Henderson has co-starred on the Netflix series Virgin River alongside Alexandra Breckenridge, playing the role of Jack Sheridan, a former marine with PTSD. The seventh season commenced filming in spring of 2025. He was cast in A24 horror film X (2022) as Wayne Gilroy.

== Personal life ==
As of 2017, he lives in Los Angeles with his dog.

== Filmography ==
=== Film ===
Year	Title	Role	Notes
1999	Kick	Tom Bradshaw	Nominated—AFI Award for Best Actor in a Supporting Role
2000	The Summer of My Deflowering	Luke	Short film
2002	Windtalkers	Private Thomas Nellie	
2002	The Ring	Noah Clay	
2003	Skagerrak	Ian / Ken	
2004	Torque	Cary Ford	
2004	Perfect Opposites	Drew Curtis	
2004	Bride and Prejudice	William Darcy	
2005	Little Fish	Ray Robert Heart	Nominated—AFI Award for Best Actor in a Supporting Role; Nominated—FCCA Award for Best Actor in a Supporting Role
2006	Flyboys	Reed Cassidy	
2006	Smokin' Aces	Hollis Elmore	
2007	Battle in Seattle	Jay	
2009	Cedar Boys	Mathew	
2010	Home by Christmas	Young Ed	
2013	The Moment	John / Peter	
2013	Devil's Knot	Brent Davis	
2015	Everest	Andy Harris	
2016	Miracles from Heaven	Kevin Beam	
2018	The Strangers: Prey at Night	Mike	
2018	Juveniles	Oliver	
2018	Hellbent	Jeb Dupre	
2022	X	Wayne Gilroy	

=== Television ===
Year	Title	Role	Notes
1989	Strangers	Zane	Main (6 episodes)
1990	Betty's Bunch	Video Addict One	—N/a
1990	Raider of the South Seas	Jack Taylor	Main (8 episodes)
1992–1995, 2017	Shortland Street	Stuart Neilson	Main (303 episodes, Seasons 1–4 & 26)
1995	Echo Point	Zac Brennan	—N/a
1996	Sweat	Tom Nash	Main (26 episodes, Season 1)
1996	Home and Away	Geoff Thomas	Recurring (7 episodes)
1997–1999	Big Sky	Scotty Gibbs	Main (53 episodes, Seasons 1–2)
2009	House	Jeff	Episode: "Painless"; Nominated—AFI International Award for Best Actor
2011	Off the Map	Dr. Benjamin "Ben" Keeton	Main (13 episodes, Season 1)
2012	Rake	Joshua Floyd	Guest (2 episodes, Season 2)
2014–2015	The Red Road	Harold Jensen	Main (12 episodes, Seasons 1–2)
2014	Secrets & Lies	Ben Gundelach	Main (6 episodes, Season 1)
2015–2017	Grey's Anatomy	Dr. Nathan Riggs	Main cast (45 episodes, Seasons 12–14)
2019–present	Virgin River	Jack Sheridan	Main role
2020	The Gloaming	Gareth McAvaney	Main Role (8 Episodes)
2021–present	My Life Is Murder	Will Crowe	Recurring (Seasons 2–5)
2024	Madam		

=== Web series ===
Year	Title	Role	Notes
2013–2014	Auckland Daze	Martin Henderson	3 episodes

=== Music video appearances ===
Year	Title	Artist	Role	Notes
2004	"Toxic"	Britney Spears	Boyfriend	Uncredited
