= Kate Harcourt =

New Zealand actress (born 1927)

Dame Kate Harcourt DNZM JP
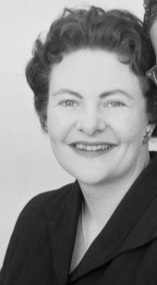
- Harcourt in 1959
- Born: Catherine Winifred Fulton; 16 June 1927 (age 99); Amberley, New Zealand
- Occupation: Actress
- Years active: 1960s–present
- Spouse: Peter Millais Harcourt (m. 1965; died 1995)
- Children: 2, including Miranda
- Relatives: Geraldine Harcourt (niece); Thomasin McKenzie (granddaughter); Davida McKenzie (granddaughter)

Dame Catherine Winifred Harcourt (née Fulton; born 16 June 1927), known professionally as Kate Harcourt, is a New Zealand actress. Over her long career she has worked in comedy as well as drama in theatre, film, TV and radio.

== Personal life ==
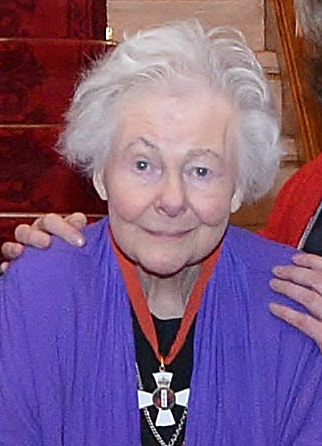
Harcourt in 2018

Harcourt was born and grew up on a sheep station in the rural area of Amberley, New Zealand. Her mother was Winifred Harriet (née Austin) and her father was Gordon Fulton. Harcourt was the youngest of three children, with an older brother, John Fulton, a prominent Canterbury farmer, and president of the Canterbury Jockey Club, as well as an older sister. From age nine onward she attended boarding school, first at Amberley House and then at Woodford House (Hawke's Bay).

Music was important to Harcourt in her early years as it was to her mother too. She went to Christchurch to train as a kindergarten teacher partly so she could continue with her singing and piano. She also attended the Joan Cross Opera School in London.

Harcourt is the mother of actress Miranda Harcourt and former Fair Go television presenter Gordon Harcourt, and grandmother of actresses Thomasin McKenzie, Davida McKenzie and journalist Peter McKenzie. She played a part in the movie adaptation of The Changeover. Harcourt met her husband Peter Harcourt (1923–1995) at Wellington Repertory Theatre. He was from the family that founded Harcourts International real estate. Peter Harcourt died on 6 March 1995 of cancer, two years after being appointed a Companion of the Queen's Service Order in the 1993 New Year Honours for service to the community as an actor, broadcaster and presenter for 54 years since 1941. The Ngā Whakarākei O Whātaitai / Wellington Theatre Awards annually has an award called The Peter Harcourt Outstanding New Playwright.

== Career ==
Harcourt returned to New Zealand from London and took up a teaching position at Woodfood House in Havelock North. After that she moved to Wellington initially teaching at Marsden College, before working at the department store Kirkaldie and Stains organising and MC'ing weekly fashion shows for seven years.

Her entry into national entertainment came as a regular voice in the morning Listen with Mother which was a radio show for pre-schoolers on Radio New Zealand. She was later host of the children's TV show Junior Magazine.

Harcourt has acted in numerous stage and screen works. Stage work includes comedy with Hens' Teeth, and acting in a version of Hedda Gabler. She had a long association with theatre company Downstage starting out putting up posters for them. She lists acting in New Zealand playwright Renée's Wednesday to Come as one of her career favourites. Harcourt played Mary in the world premiere at Downstage Theatre in 1984.

In 1998 Harcourt performed on stage alongside her daughter Miranda Harcourt in the biographical Flowers from my Mother's Garden at the New Zealand Festival of the Arts. Written by Harcourt's daughter and son-in-law Stuart McKenzie, it was partly based on letters between mother and daughter. A review stated that the play shared "the experiences of a mother, daughter and extended family with an ingenious simplicity that belies the depth of insight. It's a prime example of how universal the particular can be."

== Honours ==
In the 1996 Queen's Birthday Honours, Harcourt was appointed as a Dame Companion of the New Zealand Order of Merit, for services to the theatre.

== Theatre and screen work ==
=== Film ===
Year	Production	Role	Production company / director	Ref.
2017	The Changeover	Winter Carlisle	Changeover Films Ltd, dir. Stuart McKenzie, Miranda Harcourt	
2013	Hope & Wire	Dotty	GPP / Hope & Wire Productions	
2008	Separation City	Mrs Simpson	Separation City Limited, dir. Paul Middleditch	
2007	Apron Strings	Nan (Core Cast)	Dir. Sima Urale	
2007	Garage Sale	Margie	GS Productions Ltd, dir. Paul Murphy	
2003	Without a Paddle	Old Woman	Viacom Ltd	
2002	The Lord of the Rings: The Two Towers		3'6" Ltd, dir. Peter Jackson	
1988	Send a Gorilla		Dir. Melanie Read	
1984	Mr Wrong		Dir. Gaylene Preston	
1982	Carry Me Back	Mrs. Brewster	Dir. John Reid	
1981	Trespasses		Dir. Peter Sharp	
1980	Beyond Reasonable Doubt		Dir. John Laing	

=== Television ===
Year	Production	Role	Production company / director	Ref.
2015	Lumen	Chambermaid	Ninth Floor NZ Productions	
2008	The Table Plays – Jack in the box	Nan	First Hand Productions, dir. Keith Hunter	
2007	A Tall Long Faced Tale	Sophie/ Pirate Mother voice	Production Shed.TV Ltd	
2007	The Killian Curse 2		TVNZ	
2005	The Insider's Guide to Love	Shaun	Gibson Group	
2005	Shortland Street	Mavis Miller	South Pacific Pictures	
1997	William Tell		Cloud 9 Entertainment Ltd	
1997	Mirror, Mirror		Dir. Gibson Group	
1996 1997	Hercules		Pacific Renaissance	
1995	Plain Tastes		Montana Sunday Theatre, dir. Niki Caro	
1994	Fallout	Margaret Thatcher	South Pacific Pictures, Avalon Studios	
1991	Rodney and Juliet		Dir. Fane Flaws	
1987	Gloss: Between the Lines	(final ep)		
1986	Worzel Gummidge			
1986	Seekers			
1986	Open House		TVNZ	
1985	Night of the Red Hunter			
1984	Inside Straight			
1983	Mark ll		Dir. John Anderson	
1982	Gliding On			
1981	Open File			
1980	Cleaning Company			
1980	Country GP		TVNZ	
1983	Hooks and Feelers		Dir. Melanie Read	
1964–1965	Junior Magazine	Presenter		

=== Short film ===
Year	Production	Role	Production company / director	Ref.
2017	The Pact	Betty	Happiness Ltd	
2013	Pigeon		Mo Fresh Productions	
2012	The Silk	Mrs Blackie	Dir. Nathalie Boltt, Clare Burgess	
2010	Pacific Dreams	Grace Leahy	Morepork Films Ltd / Inspire Films Ltd	
2007	The Shoe Box	Martha Wilson	Dir. Chaz Harris	
2005	The Plant	Beryl	Isola Productions	
1994	The Dig		Dir. Neil Pardington	
2012	Rhode Island Film Festival	Best Actress in a Short Film	Pacific Dreams	
2011	Rhode Island Film Festival	Best Actress	Pacific Dreams	

=== Web series ===
Year	Production	Role	Production company / director	Ref.
2017	Lucy Lewis Can't Lose s2	Librarian	Redletter TV	

=== Theatre ===
Year	Production	Role	Production company / director	Ref.
2020	The Older the Better		Hens Teeth	
2014	Destination Beehive		Circa Theatre, dir. Jan Bolwell	
2012	Flowers from my Mother's Garden	Kate Harcourt	Downstage Theatre, dir. Tim Spite	
2010	Auntie & Me	Auntie	Wgtn Opera House / Tour, dir. Kevin Baddeley	
2007	Babar The Elephant	Narrator	NZ Symphony Orchestra	
2007	Uncle Vanya	Nurse	Circa Theatre, dir. Susan Wilson	
2006 07	Music Hall	core cast	Centerstage, dir. Kevin Baddeley	
2006	Truth About Love		Expressions Theatre, Lower Hutt	
2006	Mum's Choir	Auntie (core cast)	Downstage Theatre, dir. Cathy Downes	
2003	My Fair Lady	Mrs Higgins	Dir. Stephen Robinson	
2002	Halfmen of O		Calico Theatre, Napier	
2001	Musicians of Bremen		Gypsy Capital E / Tour	
1998 1999	Flowers From My Mothers Garden	Harcourt/McKenzie	Te Papa Soundings Theatre / Int. Fest of the Arts	
1998 1999	Son's	Mrs McFarlane	Te Papa Soundings Theatre / Int. Fest of the arts	
1998 1999	Weekends	Iris Pollard	Circa Theatre	
1996	Hens Teeth	Various	NZIFA / Circa Theatre	
1993	Ophelia Thinks Harder	Gertrude	Circa Theatre	
1993	Joyful and Triumphant	Lila Bishop	Centrepoint Theatre	
1992	The Importance of Being Earnest	Lady Bracknell	Centrepoint Theatre	
1991 92	Hens Teeth	Adelaide Festival, Auckland Festival		
1990	Oracles and Miracles	Mother	National Tour	
1990	Hedda Gabler	Bertha	Downstage / Edinburgh / Oslo / Sydney / Festival	
