= John Callen =

English-born New Zealand actor and director

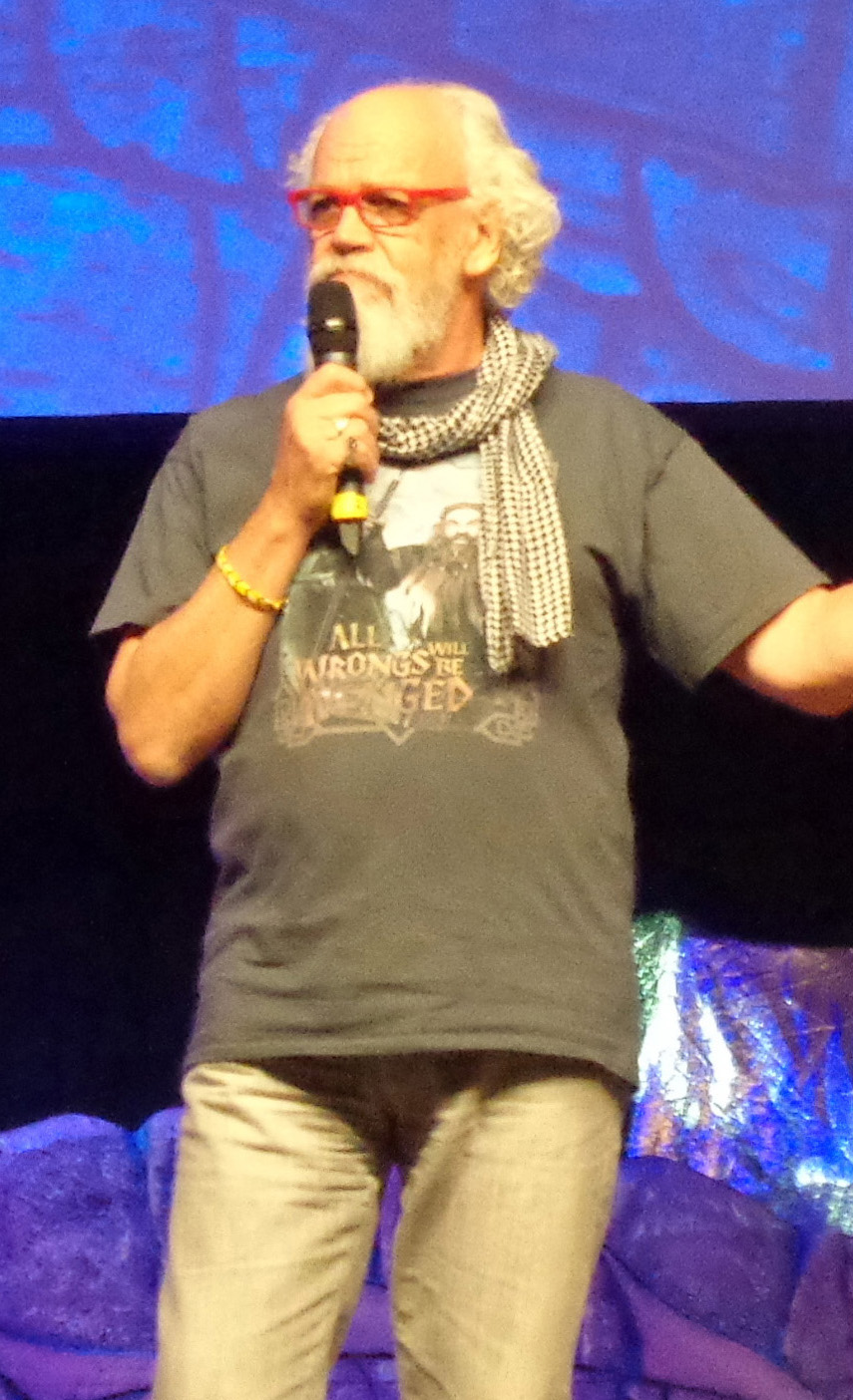
- Callen on 6 April 2015 at the Hobbitcon III convention in Bonn, Germany
- Born: 4 November 1946 (age 79); England
- Occupations: Actor, director

John Callen (born 4 November 1946) is an English-born New Zealand actor and director. He portrayed Óin, brother of Glóin in the 2012–2014 film trilogy The Hobbit.

== Career ==
Callen has performed in movies, including The Rainbow Warrior (as David Lange, the 32nd Prime Minister of New Zealand) and TV shows, as well as directing The Tribe, and lent his voice to Power Rangers Jungle Fury. He has performed in Goodbye Pork Pie, Pictures, Send a Gorilla, Feathers of Peace, Fly (Best Actor in a Short Film), Treasure Island Kids (x3), Love Birds in 2010 (with Sally Hawkins and Rhys Darby), and many TV series and films including Close to Home, Pioneer Women, Roche, Moynihan, 221B Baker Street, Xena – Amazon High (with Selma Blair and Karl Urban), The Man Who Lost His Head (with Martin Clunes), and Bliss (2011).

He has also directed many works for television including Shortland Street, The Tribe, Epitaph, Taonga, and The Kiwi Who Saved Britain (2010). Most recently he appeared in Love Knots and Good Grief series 2. He has performed in and/or directed more than 100 stage plays including performances as Macbeth, Shylock, Polonius and Claudius, and has won best actor and best supporting actor for his theatre work.

He has appeared in a number of TV adverts and voiced more than 150 documentaries and thousands of adverts. He recently won NZ Actors Equity Lifetime Achievement Award.

== Filmography ==
=== Films ===
Year	Work	Role	Notes
1981	Goodbye Pork Pie		Directed by Geoff Murphy
1988	Send a Gorilla	Chris Dean	Directed by Melanie Read
1993	The Rainbow Warrior	Prime Minister David Lange	Directed by Michael Tuchner and starring Sam Neill & Jon Voight
2006	Treasure Island Kids: The Battle of Treasure Island	Conrad	Directed by Gavin Scott
2011	Love Birds	Professor Craddock	
2012	The Hobbit: An Unexpected Journey	Óin	
2013	The Hobbit: The Desolation of Smaug	Óin	
2014	The Hobbit: The Battle of the Five Armies	Óin	
2014	Syrenia	Joseph Ford	https://www.imdb.com/title/tt3456012/

=== Television ===
- Moynihan (1976) - Moynihan (Episode "You Can't Win 'Em All")
- The Governor (1977) - Private Landers (Episode "The Lame Seagull")
- Inside Straight (1984) - Bill (Episode "Episode #1.1")
- Roche (1985) - Pat Donnelly (Episode "Cowboys")
- Seekers (1986) - Bill Aspen / Bill (4 episodes)
- Worzel Gummidge Down Under (1989) - Bailiff (Episode "Them Thar Hills")
- The Rainbow Warrior (1993 TV Movie)
- Amazon High (1997 TV Movie) - Oba
- Power Rangers Mystic Force (2006) - Mucor (voice) (Episode "Code Busters")
- The Man Who Lost His Head (2007 TV Movie) - Nigel Harrison
- Power Rangers Jungle Fury (2008) - Sonimax (voice) (4 episodes)
- Moe's Christmas (2017 TV Movie) - Santa
- Touch Wood (2019) - Grandpa Charlie (Episode "Thank You, Kind Sir")

=== Video games ===
- Star Wars: Knights of the Old Republic II - The Sith Lords (2004) - Zuka

=== YouTube ===
- Viva La Dirt League - Inspiring commander (2021) (Episode "Silent hero genius - Battle Plan"), Old mentor (2021) (Episode "Mentor"), Reader (2023) (Episode: "Being forced to read in video games"), Santa (2023) (Episode: "When fake Santa runs into real Santa"), The Administrator (2024) (Episode: "Who is the Windows Administrator?")
