= New Zealand Writers Guild =

NZWG
- New Zealand Writers Guild
- Founded: 1975
- Headquarters: Auckland, New Zealand
- Location: New Zealand
- Members: 507
- Key people: Peter Cox, president
- Affiliations: NZCTU, IAWG, UNI
- Website: www.nzwritersguild.org.nz

The New Zealand Writers Guild (NZWG) is a New Zealand trade union which represents writers in the fields of film, television, radio, theatre, video and multi-media. The guild's name in Māori language is Puni Taatuhi o Aotearoa. It provides services, events, networks, lobbying, and legal advice to writers mostly in the film and television industry. The Guild is affiliated to three major union organisations, the New Zealand Council of Trade Unions, the International Affiliation of Writers Guilds and the Union Network International.

== Description ==
The Guild's members include most of the professional script writers working in New Zealand. There were 517 registered members of the Guild as of 2 November 2016. The Guild was founded in 1975. It was initially established to set minimum rates and conditions for writers working in television. It has expanded to encompass all script writing fields.

The NZWG lobbies government to improve conditions for writers, comments about matters relevant to writers and represents the interests of writers when dealing with funding bodies and other industry organisations. The guild also publishes and provides information and advice to writers. Some of the services offered include negotiating on script credits, advice for contracts with producers, minimum rates for writers and a script registration service to help writers to protect their ideas.

The NZWG provides members with a weekly e-bulletin. Members are also provided with access to the NZWG library which includes film and television scripts, books on screen writing and industry publications from around the world. Full members host their profiles on the NZWG website (updated from Dec 2016).

Script to Screen emerged from the guild and now operates as an independent entity.

Recent successful initiatives include NZWG Seed Grants - providing NZ writers with support to develop scripts, and the annual SWANZ Awards. The SWANZ Awards, which began in 2010, support writers at all stages of their careers, with support coming from major government and private players in Aotearoa New Zealand's cultural endeavors, e.g., the New Zealand Film Commission, NZ on Air, and South Pacific Pictures, as well as extensive participation by members of other related professional associations, such as Women in Film and Television-New Zealand (WIFT-NZ). WIFT members have been active in selecting award-winners as well as being among the winners, e.g., Jessica Charlton, along with her co-writer Juliet Bergh, in 2012.

== Governance and office ==
The NZWG board is made up of several screenwriters working in the NZ entertainment industry.

Board members have included:

Pip Hall, Steve Barr, Allan Baddock, Alan Brash, Kathryn Burnett, Andrew Gunn, Fiona Samuel, Peter Cox, Caroline Grose, Benedict Reid, Alison Davie, Barry Duffield, Roseanne Liang, Mark Prebble, Mike Riddell, D F Mamea, Sean Molloy, and Athina Tsoulis.

Executive directors have included:

Alice Shearman, Steven Gannaway, Philippa Boyens, Dominic Sheehan and Susy Pointon.

The main office for the NZWG is located in the Grey Lynn area of Auckland.
