= Child of Fortune (novel) =

1978 novel by Yuko Tsushima

- Author: Yuko Tsushima
- Translator: Geraldine Harcourt
- Language: Japanese
- Genre: Literary fiction, autofiction, I-novel
- Publisher: Kodansha (Japanese); Penguin Classics (English)
- Publication date: June 29, 1978 (Japanese); October 30, 2018 (English)
- Publication place: Japan
- Awards: Women's Literature Prize
- ISBN: 978-4061976986
- Preceded by: 歓びの島 (Island of Joy)
- Followed by: 氷原 (Ice Field)

Child of Fortune (寵児, Chōji; lit. Favorite) is a 1978 novel by Yūko Tsushima. In Japan, it won the Women's Literature Prize in the same year. An English translation by Geraldine Harcourt was published in 2018 by Penguin Classics.

== Synopsis ==
The novel follows Koko, a middle-aged woman and piano teacher, who raises her 11-year-old daughter, Kayako, alone in an apartment and once again gets pregnant after a brief affair.

== Critical reception ==
The Japan Times called it "A novel at once powerfully uplifting and achingly sad" and lauded Geraldine Harcourt's "elegant translation". The Japan House in Los Angeles observed how Tsushima tackled the I-novel form with a "distinctly female spin". Abhrajyoti Chakraborty in The New Yorker cautioned against reading Tsushima's works, including Child of Fortune, through a strictly biographical lens, stating that such an approach would be "to deny her narrators a selfhood independent of society, and to deny Tsushima the freedom, as a writer, not to be conflated with her protagonists." For LitHub, Rónán Hession recommended the book in a list of books that excelled in empathetic writing.

After Harcourt's death in 2019, Newsroom wrote a tribute article on her behalf, stating that "Harcourt's translations seem to hold and carry the voices of the original, which strikes me as an unfathomable kind of magic" specifically with regard to Child of Fortune and Territory of Light.
