= NZFC =

NZFC may refer to:

- New Zealand Film Commission, government agency in New Zealand
- New Zealand Football Championship, the top level division of association football in New Zealand
- Nantong Zhiyun F.C., a Chinese football club
