= Writers Guild =

Writers Guild may refer to:

- Australian Writers' Guild
- New Zealand Writers Guild
- Writers Guild of America
  - Writers Guild of America, East
  - Writers Guild of America, West
- Writers Guild of Canada
- Writers' Guild of Great Britain
