= Wednesday to Come =

Play by Renée

Wednesday to Come is the first play in a trilogy by New Zealand playwright Renée. The second play in the trilogy is Pass It On, and the third is Jeannie Once. The play follows the women of a family during the Great Depression in New Zealand.

== Background ==
Wednesday to Come by writer Renée is her best known play. It was written for a Playmarket script competition and Renée had received a New Zealand Arts Council Grant to support the writing. It was presented at a playwrights conference in May 1984 directed by George Webby who went on to direct the premier production.

Renée forged a path in New Zealand with her writing 'about working-class women, takatāpui and Māori' and Wednesday to Come included four generations of working class women. The first performance took place at Downstage Theatre in Wellington on 17 August 1984, directed by George Webby. The play was published in 1985 by Victoria University Press.

An example of Renée's feminist lens in the play is the statement by the character Iris speaking to her position as a working-class woman:

Who will remember us? We need someone because it seems to me that everyone’s forgotten about us. And even if they do remember it’ll only be bits. We’re the ones they leave out when they write up the books.

Wednesday to Come set during the 1930s is the first in a trilogy of plays featuring the same family. The second play is Pass It On (1986) set during the 1951 New Zealand waterfront dispute and the third play is a prequel Jeannie Once (1991) set in 1879 featuring the great-grandmother of Jeannie from Wednesday to Come.

== Characters ==
- Granna – in her late seventies
- Mary – fifty-five
- Iris – thirty-four
- Cliff – fifteen
- Jeannie – thirteen
- Ted – thirty-six
- Molly – twenty-eight
- Dot – thirty-five

== Synopsis ==
The play is set in early spring of 1934. It takes place in Mary's family house, halfway between Palmerston North and Wellington. Domestic tasks such as ironing, washing, dishwashing and cooking take place during the play. Granna, Iris, Mary, Jeannie and Cliff are in the kitchen, waiting for Ted to come home. He arrives with a coffin, and it becomes apparent that Ben has killed himself while working at a labour camp in the Great Depression.

== Productions ==
Producer (Location)	Date	Crew	Cast
Downstage Theatre (Hannah Playhouse), Wellington	17 August – 22 September 1984	Director: George Webby Designer: Janet Williamson Lighting: Stephen Blackburn	Granna: Davina Whitehouse Mary: Kate Harcourt Iris: Jane Waddell Cliff: Tim Homewood Jeannie: Lucy Sheehan Ted: Cliff Wood Molly: Michelle Leuthart Dot: Ruth Dudding
Court Theatre (Christchurch)	3 November 1984	Director: Alex Gilchrist Designer: Tony Geddes	Granna: Gwyneth Hughes Mary: Judie Douglass Iris: Wickham Pack Jeannie: Eilish Moran Ted: John Curry Molly: Janet Fisher Dot: Yvonne Martin Cliff: Christian Boje
Theatre Corporate (Auckland)	9/11/1984–22/12/1984	Director: Sarah Peirse Designer: John Parker Production Manager: Murray Lynch	Granna: Yvonne Lawley Mary: Dorothy McKegg Iris: Elizabeth Hawthorne Jeannie: Alison Bruce Cliff: Phillip Gordon Ted: Ross Duncan Molly: Vivienne Laube Dot: Teresa Woodham
Fortune Theatre (Dunedin)	7/6/1985–29/6/1985	Director: Lisa Warrington	Granna: Pamela Pow Mary: Shirley Kelly Iris: Miranda Harcourt Jeannie: Hilary Halba Cliff: James Maclaurin Ted: Nic Farra Molly: Anne-Marie Speed Dot: Beverley Reid
Globe Theatre (Dunedin)	4/6/1992–13/6/1992	Director: Renée Set design: Bruce Appleton Lighting design: Bruce Appleton Costume design: Maryanne Douglas	Granna: Marion Coxhead Mary: Mary Sutherland Iris: Bernadette Doolan Jeannie: Petka Dragonoff Cliff: Chris Holdsworth Ted: John Forman Alex Bolton, Belinda Meyer
Russell St Theatre (Melbourne)	13/5/1993–12/6/1993	Director: Janis Bolodis Lighting design: Jamieson Lewis Designer: Trina Parker	Granna: Iris Shand Mary: Helen Tripp Iris: Robynne Bourne Jeannie: Shanti Gudgeon Cliff: Eugene Wheelahan Ted: Robert Menzies Molly: Christen O'Leary Dot: Beth Child
Downstage Theatre (Wellington)	27/5/2005–25/6/2005	Director: Geraldine Brophy Costume design: John Senczuk Lighting design: Lisa Maule Set design: John Hodgkins	Granna: Kate Harcourt Mary: Jane Waddell Iris: Miranda Harcourt Jeannie: Ellen Simpson Ted: Jed Brophy Cliff: Michael Whalley Molly: Rachel More Dot: Katherine McRae
Circa Theatre (Wellington)	23/7/2022–20/8/2022	Director: Erina Daniels Set and lighting design: Natala Gwiazdzinski Costume design: Cara Louise Waretini Sound design: Maaka Phat	Granna: Jane Waddell Mary: Grace Hoete Iris: Neenah Dekkers-Reihana Jeannie: Mia van Oyen Ted: Jonny Potts Cliff: Reon Bell Molly: Hannah Kelly Dot: Amanda Noblett

Amateur productions include

- Theatrevue at the Left Bank Theatre, Hamilton, in April 1985, directed by Marc Shaw
- Marlborough Repertory Society at the Boathouse Theatre (Blenheim), March 1987, directed by Pam Logan
- Te Awamutu Little Theatre, in April/May 1987, directed by David Broadhurst
- Globe Theatre, Dunedin, in 1995, directed by Hilary Halba
- Riccarton Players in Christchurch, in 2005, director by Doug Clarke
- Hutt Repertory in 2012, directed by Doug Buchanan

== Response ==
The premier production at Downstage attracted positive reviews. It was described as a 'triumph', Downstage was rewarded for programming it, Renée was acknowledged as one of New Zealand 'finest playwrights', and reviewers also acknowledged the presentation of a women's perspective and experience's usually absent from centre-stage. The prime minister of the time David Lange attended and had his photo taken for the newspaper.

Playmarket published in 1986 a schools study guide of Pass It On and Wednesday to Come in their ACT Magazine (v.11 n.3 Jun 1986).

Extracts from Wednesday to Come were included in A Country of Two Halves, and Whaddarya?, productions by Young and Hungry National Schools Tour, which appeared at BATS Theatre in Wellington and toured schools nationally in 2018, in July 2021 respectively.
