= Trial Run (1984 film) =

- Directed by: Melanie Read
- Screenplay by: Melanie Read
- Produced by: Don Reynolds
- Starring: Annie Whittle
- Cinematography: Allen Guilford
- Edited by: Finola Dwyer
- Production companies: Double Feature Investments; Cinema and Television Productions
- Release date: 1984
- Running time: 90 minutes
- Country: New Zealand

Trial Run is a 1984 New Zealand film directed by Melanie Read starring Annie Whittle. The film is a feminist revision of the thriller genre.

== Plot summary ==
Rosemary Edmonds, a photographer and runner, must temporarily leave her husband and two children when she moves into a remote coastal cottage to carry out an assignment to photograph a colony of rare penguins. It soon becomes apparent that she is being stalked in the cottage by an unknown tormentor. In a twist ending, the "stalker" is revealed to be Rosemary's own teenage son.

== Cast ==
- Annie Whittle as Rosemary Edmonds
- Judith Gibson as Frances Hunt
- Christopher Broun as James Edmonds
- Philippa Mayne as Anne Edmonds
- Stephen Tozer as Michael Edmonds
- Martyn Sanderson as Alan West
- Lee Grant as Mrs Jones
- Frances Edmond as Police Constable Miller
- Teresa Woodham as publisher
- Allison Roe as Allison
- Karen Sims as reporter
- Maggie Eyre as Miss Walsh
- Margaret Blay as ghost

== Production ==
Trial Run was the first New Zealand feature film to be written and directed by a woman, (Note: Some sources give priority to Yvonne Mackay's The Silent One (1984), although Mackay's role was as director, not screenwriter.) and had a largely female cast and crew. Marathon runner Allison Roe and reporter Karen Sims appear briefly as themselves in a television interview seen early in the film.

== Reception ==
The film received mixed reviews. In New Zealand, The Press described it as "enjoyable and satisfying in its small way", while Rip It Up felt the film suffered from a "rather sketchy script". In the UK, critic F. Maurice Speed called it a "fascinating and cleverly worked thriller"; Leslie Halliwell and John Elliot found the film generated some suspense but criticised its surprise ending as weak; while Time Out and The Guardian found the final revelation of the culprit's motives to be "preposterous" and "verging on the incomprehensible".

Several film historians have compared Trial Run to Gaylene Preston's Mr. Wrong (1985), another New Zealand thriller with feminist themes.
