= The Marching Girls (TV series) =

- Created by: Fiona Samuel
- Written by: Fiona Samuel; Anne Kennedy; Judith Fyfe
- Directed by: Melanie Read; Lex Van Os; Tony Wilson; John Anderson
- Composer: Peter Blake
- Country of origin: New Zealand
- Original language: English
- No. of seasons: 1
- No. of episodes: 7

Production
- Producers: Stephen La Hood
- Cinematography: Wayne Vinten
- Editors: Clive Bayliss; Victoria Quade
- Running time: 60 minutes

Original release
- Release: October 21 – December 2, 1987

The Marching Girls is a New Zealand television series that aired on One in 1987. It follows the Taita Supremes marching team as they prepare to compete in the North Island Championships. Most episodes had a focus on an individual character.

Sheryn Pahina was the actors tutor, teaching them marching and, with three of her daughters, choreographing the teams final routine where they wore chains and leathers and marched to Iron Lung's heavy metal music.

== Episodes ==
1. Mahara's Story
2. Leonie's Story
3. Kerry's Story
4. Shona's Story
5. Donna-Marie's Story
6. Doreen's Story
7. No Marching Girl Is An Island

== Cast ==
- Patupatu Ripley as Mahara
- Shelley Luxford as Leonie
- Jan Fisher as Donna-Marie
- Hilary Halba as Michelle
- Brenda Kendall as Nicole
- Rachel Lang as Lou
- Carmel McGlone as Doreen
- Katherine McRae as Janice
- Perry Piercy as Kerry
- Shari Wilson as Shona
- Liddy Holloway as Naomi
- Joy Watson as Lorraine
- Ross Girven as Barry

== Reception ==
The Marching Girls got 10 percent of viewers in its first episode ratings, scoring best with women over 40. The series received nine nominations at the 1988 Listener Film and Television Awards.

Writing on the early episodes Ken Strongman in The Press was critical about many aspects of this series but finished "Now and again, in brief flashes, "The Marching Girls" is far better than this review suggests." Ruth Zankker of The Press wrote "It's a pity that the series, which is chockers with moments of well observed NewZild life, should be spoilt by lack of production time."
