= Illustrious Energy =

- Directed by: Leon Narbey
- Written by: Leon Narbey and Martin Edmond
- Produced by: Chris Hampson and Don Reynolds
- Starring: Shaun Bao; Harry Ip
- Cinematography: Alan Locke
- Edited by: David Coulson
- Music by: Jan Preston
- Release date: 1988
- Running time: 95 min
- Country: New Zealand
- Language: English

Illustrious Energy is a New Zealand film released in 1988. It was filmed in Otago and was directed by Leon Narbey.

== Cast ==
- Shaun Bao as Chan
- Harry Ip as Kim
- Peter Chin as Wong
- Desmond Kelly as Surveyor
- Peter Hayden as Reverend Don
- Heather Bolton as Mrs Wong
- Geeling Ng as Li
- David Telford as Stan Pasco

== Reception ==
Lynell George from LA Weekly gave the film a mixed review, praising the lead actors but stating that the "film's weakness lies in the script". Honolulu Star-Advertiser's Peter Rosegg says it is "a beautiful film, with long, meaningful shots of stunning, wide-screen scenery" but not enough happens early in the film and when it finally gets moving it is "low-key and under dramatized". Burl Burlingame, writing in Honolulu Star-Bulletin, says it "starts out so low-key it's almost comatose" but encourages viewers to stick with it as it "picks up steam". Michael Wilmington in the Los Angeles Times mentions the film noting that it is "richly photographed" but otherwise "it's a lugubrious tale".

Helen Martin in New Zealand film, 1912-1996 wrote "While the characters are individually drawn, their story suggests myth and archetype, inviting the film to be read as an allegory asking questions about history and the human condition. The dream-like rhythm is created by a measured pace and by the extraordinary beauty of the images. From the opening shot the landscape dominates, from gorgeous, intractable sky to the bare plains with their coarse, towering rock faces, dwarfing the birds flying by and the men digging in the hard earth. The narrative is rich in documentary detail conveyed through meticulous production design which used Reverend Don's photographs as source material for costume ideas."

Douglas Jenkin from NZ Listener said "In my opinion this is the most assured and sophisticated of recent New Zealand films. The sensitive, intelligent screenplay by director Leon Narbey and Martin Edmond realistically evokes the way early Chinese immigrants lived. And it does so by viewing the world as they did. The landscape and their relationship to it predominates and gives the film some of its most striking images (the cinematography throughout is excellent)" Reviewing for North & South Brian McDonnell wrote "Leon Narbey’s arresting images render human figures and elemental landscapes with breathtaking assurance. Illustrious Energy makes few concessions to commercial values but is near faultless as a work of art." In Illusions 11 Tony Chuah criticised the film fot the "use of conceptions of Chineseness that verge on cliche".

== Awards ==
New Zealand Film and TV Awards 1988

- Best Performance, Female in a Supporting Role - Heather Bolton - won
- Best Performance, Male in a Supporting Role - Peter Hayden - won
- Best Film Director - Leon Narbey - won
- Best Cinematography - Alan Locke - won
- Best Film Editing - David Coulson - won
- Best Contribution to a Film Soundtrack - Bob Allen, Gethin Creagh, Mike Hopkins - won
- Best Production Design - Jeanelle Aston - won
- Best Film Score - Jan Preston - won
