= Joan Tully =

Australian agricultural scientist (1907–1973)

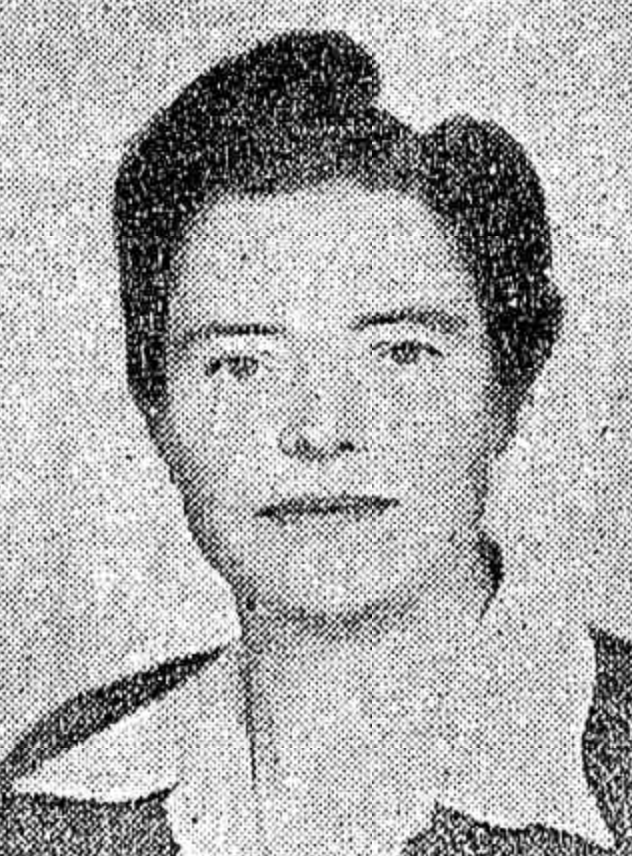
- Born: Joan Hearman; 9 September 1907; Mortlake, Surrey, UK
- Died: 11 June 1973 (aged 65); Brisbane, Queensland, Australia
- Education: Presbyterian Ladies' College, Perth
- Alma mater: University of Western Australia
- Scientific career
- Fields: agricultural science
- Institutions: C.I.S.R.

Joan Tully (née Hearman; 9 September 1907 – 11 June 1973) was an Australian agricultural scientist and academic. She was one of the first female lecturers in agricultural science in Australia.

== Life ==
Tully was born in Mortlake, Surrey, England, to Minnie (née Merrifield) and Walter Edgar Hearman. Her family emigrated to Western Australia when she was a child, settling in Donnybrook. Her younger brother, John Hearman, later became a state MP. Tully boarded at Presbyterian Ladies' College, Perth, before going on to the University of Western Australia, where she completed a Bachelor of Science degree in 1932. She then went to study in England, receiving her doctorate in horticulture from the University of London in 1936. Upon returning to Australia, Tully joined the Forests Department of Western Australia as a research officer. However, her time there was short-lived, as in 1938 she went to Griffith, New South Wales, to work as a plant physiologist for the federal government's Council for Scientific and Industrial Research (CSIR).

Tully gave up her post with the CSIR in February 1945, having married the previous year. She was widowed later in 1945, and returned to work to help provide for her four step-children. For a short period, she was seconded to the federal Department of Agriculture, working on the Murrumbidgee Irrigation Area (MIA). In 1952, Tully was awarded a Fulbright Scholarship, which she used to study at Cornell University, in Ithaca, New York. She returned to Australia in 1953, and 1956 transferred to the CSIR's Melbourne station. In 1957, Tully was seconded to the Department of Psychology at the University of Melbourne, conducting research into farmers' decision making with Oscar Oeser and Fred Emery. She moved to the university's Department of Agriculture in 1959, where she completed a research project on farmers in Rochester, Victoria.

In 1961, Tully took up a position as a lecturer at the University of New England, in Armidale, New South Wales. The following year, she was appointed as a senior lecturer at the University of Queensland's Department of Agriculture. Her teaching emphasised the links between agriculture and behavioural science. Tully was promoted to reader in 1971, and the following year made a fellow of the Australian Institute of Agricultural Science. She died in Brisbane in 1973, of a heart attack.
