= Woman Running in the Mountains =

1980 novel by Yūko Tsushima

- Author: Yūko Tsushima
- Translator: Geraldine Harcourt
- Language: Japanese
- Genre: Literary fiction
- Publisher: Kodansha (Japanese); Pantheon Books (English); New York Review Books (English reissue)
- Publication date: 1980 (Japanese); 1991 (English); 2022 (English reissue)
- ISBN: 978-4061832411
- Preceded by: 燃える風 (Burning Wind)
- Followed by: 水府 (Water Palace)

Woman Running in the Mountains (山を走る女, Yama o hashiru onna) is a 1980 novel by Yūko Tsushima, published by Kodansha. In 1991, an English translation by Geraldine Harcourt was published by Pantheon Books. In 2022, Harcourt's English translation was reissued by New York Review Books as a classic with an introduction by Lauren Groff.

== Synopsis ==
Set in seventies Japan, the novel follows a woman named Takiko Odaka as she heads to a hospital to give birth to a boy. While her parents disapprove of her pregnancy, which resulted from an affair with a married man, Takiko embraces the challenge of motherhood—which she views as an escape from the pressures and hardships of her family—while she and her child live in Tokyo.

== Critical reception ==
The New York Times wrote that "the book captures the intimate transformations, physical and existential, of a solitary young mother." The publication also recommended the novel for their Editor's Choice column in February 2022. In LitHub, Groff observed Tsushima's unprecedented handling of single parenthood as a topic in Japanese literature while also cautioning readers against interpreting her novels as I-novels or autofiction. Ultimately, Groff called it "a book that shines with hope." The Los Angeles Times argued that the New York Review Books reissue was especially relevant for the COVID-19 pandemic, a time when the struggles of parenthood became much more pronounced. Minnesota Star Tribune lauded Harcourt's "fine translation" and praised Tsushima's "atmospheric, lovely descriptions" and "dreamlike, almost mystical sequences". The Japan Society noted some sense of antiquatedness in Harcourt's translation from the nineties but nonetheless appreciated its "lucid quality, emphasising the artistic cleanliness of Tsushima’s prose all the more." The Asian Review of Books observed the novel's attention to the experiences of motherhood, noting that "For a reader who is also a mother, Takiko’s experiences are notably familiar."
