= New Zealand Film and Television School =

Higher education institute (2000–2018)

The New Zealand Film and Television School
- Type: Higher education institute
- Active: 2000–2018
- Location: 86 Vivian Street, Wellington, New Zealand; 41.29557°S 174.77822°E
- Website: Official website at the Wayback Machine (archived 27 January 2018)

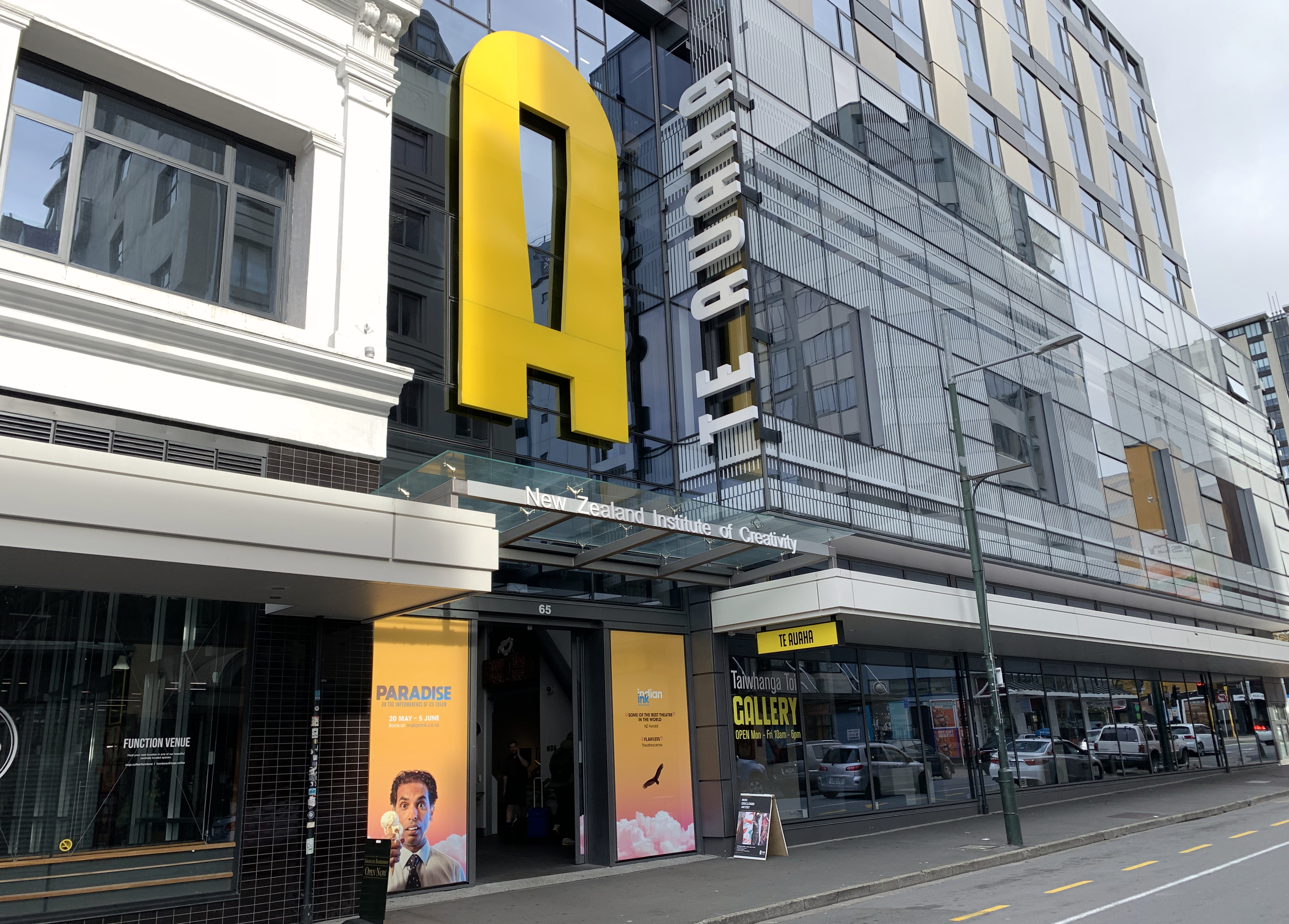
The school’s new location at Te Auaha, Dixon Street, Wellington, New Zealand

The New Zealand Film and Television School was a higher education institution centred on the visual arts based in Wellington, New Zealand. It was founded in 2000, and acquired in 2012 by Whitireia New Zealand. In 2018 it was absorbed into Whitireia at its new campus Te Auaha.

== History ==
The school was founded as a charitable trust by a group of local filmmakers including Robin Laing, Alun Bollinger and John Reid. It began classes on 31 August 2000 (with a formal opening ceremony taking place in May 2001) and was originally based in the suburb of Newtown. The initial director, Ruth Jeffery, said at the time that school would ensure more locally-trained filmmakers at a time when "there's more money around, [and] there are going to be more films made in this country". Its setup costs were partly funded by the Wellington City Council; mayor Mark Blumsky said that it would ensure that film production in Wellington continued following the Lord of the Rings trilogy.

A school named the New Zealand Film and Television School had previously operated in Christchurch until 1999, when it closed following rent problems and a dispute with students. The Wellington school was set up as a new non-profit organisation with no relationship to the Christchurch school, apart from acquiring some of its courses.

The school offered a full-time 40 week-long course in filmmaking. Unlike other film schools in New Zealand, it specialised in the use of film stock rather than video. In 2006, the school collaborated with acting students from Toi Whakaari to create short films which were screened at the City Gallery. As of 2009, the school had around 50 students each year, with at least two applicants for every place. In 2011, students were divided into two intakes of 24 students each year.

The school was purchased by Whitireia New Zealand in 2012, and initially kept its brand and location. In 2018 the film course became part of Whitirea based at its new Te Auaha campus on Dixon Street.

== Notable faculty ==
- Waka Attewell, cinematographer
- Ian Mune (born 1941), character actor, director, and screenwriter
- Gaylene Preston (born 1947), documentary filmmaker
- Sima Urale, filmmaker (Head Tutor in 2012)

== Notable alumni ==
- Jess Charlton, cinematographer
- Alex Galvin (born 1975), director of Eternity (2013)
- Jason Lei Howden, film director and visual effects artist
- David Schurmann (born 1974), filmmaker, explorer, speaker & CEO
- Mikhail Svetov (born 1985), Russian politician and blogger
- Tusi Tamasese (born 1975 or 1976), film director
