= Geraldine Harcourt =

New Zealand translator (1952–2019)

- Born: Geraldine Millais Harcourt; 25 May 1952; Auckland, New Zealand
- Died: 21 June 2019 (aged 67); Wellington, New Zealand
- Occupation: Translator
- Relatives: Kate Harcourt (aunt); Miranda Harcourt (cousin); Thomasin McKenzie (cousin once removed); Davida McKenzie (cousin once removed)

Geraldine Millais Harcourt (25 May 1952 – 21 June 2019) was a New Zealand translator of modern Japanese literature.

== Early life and education ==
Harcourt was born in Auckland on 25 May 1952. She graduated from the University of Auckland, and first went to Japan in 1973.

== Career ==
Harcourt developed a close working relationship with Japanese fiction writer Yūko Tsushima, and translated many of her works into English. These include:

- Yūko Tsushima, Child of Fortune (1978)
- Yūko Tsushima, Territory of Light (1979)
- Yūko Tsushima, Woman Running in the Mountains (1980)
- Yūko Tsushima, The Shooting Gallery & Other Stories (1973–1984)
- Yūko Tsushima, Of Dogs and Walls (2018)

Works by other Japanese authors translated into English by Harcourt include:

- Shizuko Gō, Requiem (1985)
- Hirotada Ototake, No One's Perfect (1998)
- Yūko Tanaka, The Power of the Weave: The Hidden Meanings of Cloth (2013)
- Takeshi Nakagawa, The Japanese House in Space, Memory, and Language (2006)

== Awards ==
In 1990, Harcourt was awarded the Wheatland Translation Prize. She won the 2018–2019 Lindsley and Masao Miyoshi Translation Prize for her translation of Territory of Light, published by Penguin in 2017.

== Death ==
Harcourt died in Wellington on 21 June 2019.
