= Esther Mary Baber =

Esther Mary Baber (21 March 1871 – 19 November 1956) was a New Zealand headmistress. She was born in Christchurch, New Zealand on 21 March 1871. She ran the Fitzherbert Terrace School for many years, which later became the Samuel Marsden Collegiate School.

In 1935, she was awarded the King George V Silver Jubilee Medal.
