= Send a Gorilla =

New Zealand comedy film

- Directed by: Melanie Read
- Written by: Melanie Read
- Produced by: Robin Laing; Dorothee Pinfold; Peter Sainsbury
- Starring: Carmel McGlone; Katherine McRae; Perry Piercy
- Cinematography: Wayne Vinten
- Edited by: Paul Sutorius
- Production company: Energy Source
- Release date: 1988
- Running time: 90 minutes
- Country: New Zealand
- Language: English

Send a Gorilla is a 1988 New Zealand comedy film directed by Melanie Read.

== Synopsis ==
Valentine's Day is the busiest day in the year for three young women and their singing telegram service. Their Send A Gorilla Singing Telegram Company has started badly they are short-staffed and drowning in orders. The boss is missing, and one of the singers has lost her voice.

== Cast ==
- Carmel McGlone as Clare
- Katherine McRae as Joy
- Perry Piercy as Vicki
- John Callen as Chris Dean
- Lani John Tupu as Ian Hunter
- William Kircher as Ned
- Jim Moriarty as Joe
- Nathan Waldron as Jason
- Rima Te Wiata as Lisa
- Daniel Benseman as Toby
- Michael Haigh as Mr. Tack
- Stephen Clements as Carl / Fireman
- Kim Buchanan as Charlene
- Stanley Findlay as Anthony
- Ann Pacey as Mrs. McKinley
- Miranda Harcourt as Kerry-Anne
- Ian Watkin as Sir Richard Olphert
- Mark Wright as Kitchenhand
- Joy Watson as Daphne
- Wiki Oman as Donna
- Jane Waddell as Janine
- Dulcie Smart as Jane
- Renita Chan as Lois Wing
- Peter McAllum as Policeman
- Ross Jolly as Stranger in Grams Office
- Danny Mulheron as Owner of Boxer Dog
- Whillow Patterson as Ani
- Turei Reidy as C.O.
- Katy Platt as Female DJ
- Christianne Phillips as Twin
- Marianne Govaerts as Twin
- Ian Rae as Darryn the hairdresser
- Stephen Lovatt as Darryn's Friend
- Liz Mullane as Hairdresser
- Felicity Samuel as Female Customer
- Brian Carbee as Male customer
- Lorae Parry as Sender of revenge gram
- Jon Brazier as Dave - the filnger
- Theresa Healey as Anne - the mistress
- Duncan Smith as Keith
- Joanna Briant as Linda
- Alice Fraser as Keith's mother
- Gerald Bryan as Ian's lawyer
- Kate Harcourt as Lawyer's secretary
- Onehau as Clare's lawyer
- Peter Dennett as Construction worker #1
- Ralph Johnson as Construction worker #2
- Helen Lagen as Policewoman with dogs
- Michael Wilson as John
- Tony Box as Mechanic
- Vivienne Brown as Woman selling ice cream
- Sandra Coory as Ticketseller
- Joanne Simpson as Woman in cupboard
- Louise Graham as Friend of woman in cupboard
- Keiko Kirk as Yoko Matsumara
- Andrei Albulescu as Yoko's secretary
- Heather Benfield as Music examiner
- Murray Keane as Youth outside P.O.
- Keith Richardson as Police Constable at P.O.
- Stephen Gledhill as Function organizer
- Bill Walker as Drunk on stage
- Guy Boyce as Drunk on stage
- Michael Heath as Drunk at table
- Shelly Luxford as Radio station receptionist
- Kara Kavers as Woman in coffee bar
- Vicky Hunwick as Messenger
- Debbie Gee as Policeoman
- Leon de Villalier as Elderly car thief
- Natalie Wong as Sue
- Alan Jollifie as Ralph
- Ralph Williams as Man from Shalimar
- Richard Lawrence as Motorcyclist
- Gerald Brian as Radio voice

== Reviews ==
Jim Murphy of the Age's Green Guide says that despite not being the "tidiest" of films it "is nevertheless original, energetic and imbued with an infectious silliness that overcomes much of its gaucherie." In Variety David Stratton calls it a "farcical flop" saying "Under Read's frantically energetic, but empty direction, the principal actresses can only flounder helplessly." Helen Martin in New Zealand film, 1912-1996 wrote the "narrative creaks under the weight of a welter of issues - solo parenthood, child custody, inner city development, animal rights, relationship fidelity - and a jumble of sub-plots."

- 1994 The Women's Companion to International Film - "...the film has a lot of crazy energy..."
- 2000 Reframing women: a history of New Zealand film - "...a feminist critique of the commercialisation of romance..."

== Awards and nominations ==
- Nominated for 3 New Zealand Film and TV Awards
- 1989 Montreal Women's Film Festival - Audience Choice - Second Place.
