= Teesh and Trude =

2002 film directed by Melanie Rodriga

- Directed by: Melanie Rodriga
- Written by: Vanessa Lomma; Wilson McCaskill
- Produced by: Melissa Hasluck; Melanie Rodriga
- Starring: Susie Porter; Linda Cropper; Peter Phelps
- Cinematography: Rob Bygott; Dale McCready
- Edited by: Merlin Cornish
- Music by: Tim Count; Keith Van Geyzel; Mitey Ko (motif)
- Distributed by: ScreenWest; SBS Independent; Showtime Australia
- Release dates: 18 July 2002 (Brisbane Film Festival); 27 March 2003 (Australia)
- Running time: 93 minutes
- Country: Australia
- Language: English

Teesh and Trude is a 2002 Australian drama film directed by New Zealander Melanie Rodriga, and was adapted from an original stage-play by Wilson McCaskill. The film was produced and shot entirely in Western Australia with Production Investment Funding Support from ScreenWest and Lotterywest. It was shot on video at Murdoch University where Rodriga teaches.

The film received three nominations at the Australian Film Institute Awards in 2003 and one at the Film Critics Circle of Australia Awards.

== Plot ==
Teesh (Susie Porter), an unemployed single mother in her twenties, shares a flat with an older, divorced friend, Trude (Linda Cropper). Teesh is starting to crack under the strain of taking care of her son Kenny (Mason Richardson) and her problems only get worse when her abusive father (Bill McClusky), who's just been released from prison, visits.

Trude is also having problems with her macho boyfriend Rod (Peter Phelps), who must complete a major paving contract at the shopping mall to save his ailing construction company. Meanwhile, Trude pines after her own children, who are apparently living with their father in a different state.

== Cast ==
- Susie Porter as Letitia (Teesh)
- Linda Cropper as Trudy (Trude)
- Jacob Allan as Les
- Peter Phelps as Rod
- Bill McClusky as Bob
- Mason Richardson as Kenny
- Igor Sas as Gary
- Kazimir Sas as Craig
- Francoise Sas as Lelia
- Adam Crouch as Wes

== Critical reception ==
The Age wrote, "Not since Mallboy has there been a local drama as depressing as this." It added that, "It isn't Ken Loach or Mike Leigh but it's in that ambit and the acting is very gritty."

Urban Cinefile said that "This may not be the worst local film of the year, but at 93 minutes it still seems to last forever."

David Stratton said "The film was obviously produced on the most minimal budget, and its theatrical origins are very obvious, but, despite these limitations, the film impresses because of the excellent acting."

== See also ==
- Cinema of Australia
