= Melissa Hasluck =

Australian film producer, director and editor

Melissa Hasluck (born 1965) is an Australian film producer, director and editor.

Hasluck was born in Perth, Western Australia in 1965 and was educated at Presbyterian Ladies' College and the University of Western Australia. She completed a bachelor of arts degree in French, and lived in Europe before returning to Australia to study film and television at Swinburne University of Technology, Melbourne. She graduated from Swinburne in 1992.

In 1997, Hasluck won a West Australian Screen Award for Emerging Producer for her work on the six-part series Artists Up Front. In 1999, Hasluck was awarded a ScreenWest New Producer Fellowship, which she used to work on projects in Australia and overseas.

Hasluck founded her own production company, Cecile B Deux Mels, and produced the feature film Teesh and Trude in 2002.

== Filmography ==
Year	Title	Role	Notes
1995	Scratchings	Producer and editor	
1997	Artists Up Front	Director	
1999	Christina's Birthday	Producer	
2001	Bad Credit and Aliens	Producer	
2001	Pink Pyjamas	Producer	
2002	Teesh and Trude	Producer	
