= Getting to Our Place =

1999 New Zealand documentary

- Directed by: Gaylene Preston; Anna Cottrell
- Produced by: Gaylene Preston
- Edited by: Paul Sutorius
- Music by: Jonathan Besser
- Production company: Gaylene Preston Productions
- Release date: 1999
- Running time: 72 minutes
- Language: English

Getting to Our Place is a 1999 New Zealand documentary about building the national museum Te Papa.

== Synopsis ==
Shows the decision making process behind the building of Te Papa.

== Credits ==
- David Gascoigne – Subject
- Howard Morrison – Subject
- Jonathan Besser – Composer
- Jennifer Bush – Associate Producer
- Anna Cottrell – Co-Director, Field Director
- Mary Daysh – Field Director
- Michael Hedges – Sound Mix
- Michael Huddleston – Sound Recordist
- Robin Laing – Associate Producer
- Craig Mullis – Sound Recordist
- Gaylene Preston – Co-Director, Producer
- Kit Rollings – Sound Design
- Darryn Smith – Camera Operator
- Geoff Steven – Executive Producer
- Jason Stutter – Online Editor
- Paul Sutorius – Editor
- Chris Terpstra – Camera Operator
- Dave Tingey – Sound Recordist
- Mary Wall – Post-Production Supervisor
- Jonno Woodford-Robinson – Online Editor

== Reviews ==
- Auckland International Film Festival.
