= Presbyterian Ladies' College, Perth =

Independent, day and boarding school in Peppermint Grove, Western Australia

Location
- 14 McNeil Street; Peppermint Grove, Western Australia, 6011; Australia; 31°59′41″S 115°46′7″E

Information
- Type: Independent, day and boarding
- Motto: Latin: Labore Et Honore (By Work and With Honour)
- Denomination: Uniting Church
- Established: 1915
- Sister school: Scotch College, Perth
- Chairman: Claire Poll BJuris, LLB, BA
- Principal: Cate Begbie
- Chaplain: Nalin Perera
- Employees: ~141
- Years: PK–12
- Gender: Girls
- Enrolment: ~1200 (2007)
- Colours: Black Watch tartan, green, navy and white
- Slogan: Enriching your daughter's future
- Affiliation: Independent Girls Schools Sports Association
- Website: plc.wa.edu.au

The Presbyterian Ladies' College (informally known as PLC), is an independent, day and boarding school predominantly for girls, situated in Peppermint Grove, a western suburb of Perth, Western Australia.

Established in 1915 by the Presbyterian Church of Australia, PLC came under the control of the Uniting Church in Australia in 1977 following church union. The college moved to the current 8-acre (32,000 m^{2}) property in 1917. PLC's grounds consist of a junior school for years Pre-Kindy to Year 6, a middle school for Years 7 to 9, a senior school for Years 10 to 12, sporting grounds, arts centres and boarding facilities. The school currently caters for approximately 1200 students, with boys and girls enrolled from pre-kindergarten to pre-primary and girls only from Year 1 to Year 12. PLC also provides accommodation for up to 150 boarders in Years 7 to 12.

The college has been an IB World School since December 2006, and is authorised to offer the IB Primary Years Programme and IB Middle Years Programme and the IB Diploma Programme. PLC is also registered to offer the Western Australian state curriculum to Years 11 and 12. PLC is affiliated with the Association of Heads of Independent Schools of Australia, the Junior School Heads Association of Australia, the Australian Boarding Schools' Association, and the Alliance of Girls' Schools Australia.

== History ==
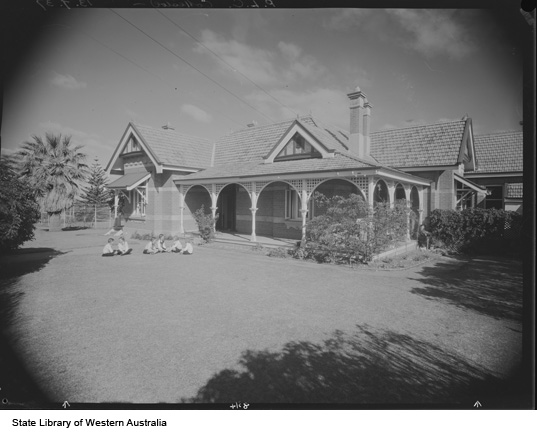
PLC students and building, 1937

On 19 August 1915, George Nisbet Dods, Moderator of the Presbyterian Church in Western Australia, called together a group of ministers and church elders to discuss the proposal of establishing a Presbyterian college for girls, since the Church had already established the Scotch College, Perth for boys. Present at this meeting were Rev Dods, Rev Alexander Crow, Principal Oxer, Rev Daniel Ross, Peter Corsair Anderson (principal of Scotch College, Perth), John Maxwell Ferguson, Donald John Carmichael, Inspector of Schools James Klein and Alexander David Ross.

Ormiston College had been established in 1907 by Constance Wilson and her two sisters in Palmerston Street, North Perth. The newly formed committee agreed to purchase Ormiston College, and the school was named Presbyterian Ladies' College and Kindergarten (Ormiston House). Wilson was taken up on her offer to continue acting as principal until a permanent one was appointed. The successful applicant was Agnes Scorgie, a certified teacher from Glasgow University. She had also studied modern language at three European universities, and had taught for twelve years at Glasgow High School. Scorgie arrived in Fremantle on 24 February 1916 and took up her duties immediately.

In January 1917, the school's committee was constituted as the first College Council. After considering several permanent locations for the school, it eventually settled on the purchase of William Gerald Lefroy's property on the corner of View and McNeil Streets, Peppermint Grove. After modifications and additions to the property, all boarders were transferred from North Perth, and the first classes began on the new campus in July. The school was officially opened by the Governor of Western Australia, William Ellison-Macartney, on 11 August 1917. The North Perth campus remained operating as a day school until the end of 1918.

== Academic performance ==
The school has traditionally performed well in the Western Australian Certificate of Education examinations and appear regularly among the top 10 schools in the state.

Year	% +75 in WACE (Note: Based on the number of Stage 3 course enrolments in the school where a WACE course score of 75 or above was achieved)	State ranking (Note: Ranking of school compared to other schools in the state)	% +65 in WACE (Note: Based on the number of Stage 3 course enrolments in the school where a WACE course score of 65 or above was achieved)	State ranking	% graduation (Note: Percentage of Year 12 cohort that graduated with a WACE certificate)
2009		4		8	97.86
2010	31.31	4	70.56	4	99.39
2011	29.54	5	71.72	3	100
2012	23.13	12	63.15	5	99.34
2013	32.20	4	62.26	4	100
2014	27.96	6	55.62	9	97.53
2015	27.94	7	60.16	6	99.29
2016					100

== Co-curriculum ==
Music

PLC offers music ensembles to both junior and senior students, including a stage band, three concert bands, three string orchestras, several string quartets, a combined chorale with Trinity College, a combined string chamber orchestra with Scotch College as well as a combined symphonic wind ensemble and vocal ensemble with PLC's brother school, Scotch College.

The school also features an all female pipe band, one of only a small number throughout Australia. The pipe band is a long-standing tradition of the school and reflects PLC's Scottish heritage.

Visual art

At PLC there is an annual visual art exhibition exhibiting works of current students done during the school year ranging from sculpture to textiles and painting. Works from PLC have been selected over the years and in 2012 to be shown in the annual "Year 12 Visual Art Perspectives" at the Art Gallery of Western Australia.

Performing arts

PLC also offers performing arts subjects, such as drama and dance. Dance and drama performances are shown annually at the school, as well as year based curriculum performances. The school's Hazel Day Drama Centre is a professional-standard theatre venue.

Sport

The Presbyterian Ladies' College physical education programme provides students of all abilities with opportunities to partake in recreational activities such as yoga and aerobics, and team sports such as netball, basketball, cricket, tennis, hockey, volleyball, soccer, softball, rowing, and water polo.

Inter-school competition is enabled through PLC's membership of the Junior School Heads Association of Australia for primary students, and the Independent Girls Schools Sports Association for middle and senior students.

== Notable alumnae ==
Alumnae of the Presbyterian Ladies' College are known as Old Collegians, and may elect to join the schools alumni association, the PLC Old Collegians' Association. Some notable Old Collegians include:

Academic

- Gillian Moore – Principal of Pymble Ladies' College (1989–2007); deputy principal of Methodist Ladies' College, Perth (1983–88)

Entertainment, media and the arts

- Claire van der Boom – Actress
- Estelle Blackburn – Journalist and author
- Katharine Brisbane – Theatre critic; publisher; co-founder of Currency Press Pty Ltd
- Jill Alison Crommelin – Journalist for The West Australian, The Australian Women's Weekly, The Straits Times (Singapore) and the Sunday Independent (also attended St Mary's Anglican Girls' School)
- Diane Dunbar – Curator of fine art at the Queen Victoria Museum and Art Gallery, Launceston
- Dame Alexandra Hasluck née Darker – Author and social historian
- Melissa Hasluck – Film producer
- Jacinta John – Actor, director, producer
- Mary-Ellen Murdoch King – Director of Orchestra Victoria; director of the Melbourne International Comedy Festival
- Sara Macliver – Classical soprano
- Judy Nunn – Author and actress
- Paula Voce – Seven News Perth presenter
- Sue-Anne Wallace – Chief executive officer, Fundraising Institute Australia Ltd; Director of Techplas Pty Ltd, founding director Queensland University of Technology Cultural Precinct, former director of Education and Curatorial Programs Museum of Contemporary Art, Sydney
- Tahnee Atkinson – Australia's Next Top Model season 5 winner, graduated 2010
- Courtney Chircop – Finalist in Make Me a Supermodel, graduated 2008
- Olivia DeJonge – Actress, graduated 2015
- Poppy Lissiman - Designer, graduated 2005

Law

- Michelle Gordon – Justice of the High Court of Australia (also attended St Mary's Anglican Girls' School)

Medicine and science

- Megan Clark – Chief executive of the Commonwealth Scientific and Industrial Research Organisation (CSIRO), inaugural head of Australian Space Agency, Rio Tinto board director
- Margaret Mary Henderson – Consultant physician and consultant emeritus, Royal Melbourne Hospital (also attended Melbourne Girls Grammar)
- Joan Tully – Agricultural scientist (CSIRO, University of Melbourne, University of Queensland)

Sport

- Hannah Vermeersch – Olympic rower (Australian women's eight, London 2012)
- Nina Kennedy – Bronze medallist pole-vaulter in Commonwealth Games 2018
- Jacqueline Swick – Australian representative rower 2022 World Rowing Championships

== See also ==
- List of schools in the Perth metropolitan area
- List of boarding schools
- List of pipe bands
