= Jess Charlton =

New Zealand cinematographer and scriptwriter

Jessica Charlton is a New Zealand cinematographer and scriptwriter who has worked since 2009 on over 30 short films, television productions, and feature-length films as well as music videos, web series, and documentaries.

== Life and career ==
Charlton was born in London but raised in Invercargill and Queenstown. She graduated from The New Zealand Film & Television School in around 2009.

In 2012 she shared with Juliet Bergh the New Zealand Writers Guild awards for Best Feature Film Script and New Writer Award for Existence, a feature-length drama starring Loren Horsley (co-star of Eagle vs Shark) and Matt Sunderland. It premiered in the 2012 New Zealand International Film Festival, and was also accepted that year as part of the Industry-only Breakthru Screenings at the Melbourne International Film Festival.

NZ on Screen calls Existence a "low budget," "salvagepunk" film, and describes it as "a rare entry in the Kiwi sci-fi feature catalogue." The New Zealand International Film Festival said in a press release that it ties into an older, more established tradition of New Zealand storytelling, the "man alone" story set in scenic natural environments, often found in New Zealand 1980's films such as The Navigator, The Quiet Earth, and Vigil.

Existence is also notable because the production team is "predominantly" female, including the producers Mhairead Connor and Melissa Dodds. Meridian Energy gave the filmmakers special permission to film at the Makara West Wind Farm, on Wellington's south coast, as part of a 24-day shoot. Additionally, the Existence team were among the last filmmakers to have the benefit of working with leading New Zealand filmmaker Graeme Tetley on developing their script.

In 2010 Existence had been one of the first recipients of the New Zealand Film Commission's $250,000 Escalator grant, and was the first film completed as part of that scheme. That year the Escalator scheme offered financial and other support to provide "four teams of talented, visionary filmmakers a fast track to making a first feature film." Escalator limits a project's budget to NZ$250,000, and requires "creative filmmaking ideas explicitly conceived with low budget production in mind." Beyond the funding, the Existence team have praised the Escalator scheme's additional benefits, especially its "boot camp" (a 4-day workshop), calling it "a great stepping-stone into feature film production."

Charlton also worked on the short "sci-fi, action/adventure film" Flip (2019; written and directed by Jessica Grace Smith). Like Existence, the film deals with an isolated mother trying to save her family in a "post-apocalyptic" environment.

In 2017 Charlton was the filmmaker for Jessica Grace Smith's award-winning short film Everybody Else is Taken, and was the director and cinematographer for the short film Discord. She was the cinematographer for the 2020 documentary feature Loimata, The Sweetest Tears. In 2022 she was the executive producer of short film Buzzkill.
