= Davida McKenzie =

New Zealand actress

- Born: 2006 or 2007 (age 19–20); Wellington, New Zealand
- Occupation: Actress
- Mother: Miranda Harcourt
- Relatives: Thomasin McKenzie (sister); Kate Harcourt (maternal grandmother); Geraldine Harcourt (cousin once removed)

Davida McKenzie (born 2006 or 2007) is a New Zealand actress. She gained recognition by being cast in Silent Night (2021) and has since appeared in major productions, including the horror film Leviticus (2026).

== Early life ==
McKenzie is the daughter of director Stuart McKenzie and actress Dame Miranda Harcourt, and the sister of actress Thomasin McKenzie. She is the granddaughter of actress Dame Kate Harcourt and Peter Harcourt, whose family founded the real estate company Harcourts International in Wellington. She went to school at Samuel Marsden Collegiate School in Wellington's Karori suburb until 2024. Like her sister, McKenzie initially did not want to be an actress and wanted to stray away from the film industry world.

== Career ==
McKenzie started acting in small film and TV projects since she was eight years old. In February 2020, McKenzie was cast as Kitty in the Christmas apocalyptic black comedy film Silent Night. In 2023, she played the lead role of Ruth in the crime documentary film The Speedway Murders and took part in the short film Our Party alongside her older sister, Thomasin.

In 2026, McKenzie starred in the LGBTQ horror film Leviticus, which premiered at the Sundance Film Festival and on 18 June 2026 in Australia. She will star in Taika Waititi's upcoming science fiction film Klara and the Sun, which is set to be released on October 23, 2026.

== Filmography ==
=== Film ===
Year	Title	Role	Director(s)	Notes
2021	Silent Night	Kitty	Camille Griffin	
2023	The Speedway Murders	Ruth	Adam Kamien; Luke Rynderman	
2026	Leviticus	Izzie	Adrian Chiarella	
2026	Klara and the Sun	Simone	Taika Waititi	

== External link ==
- Davida McKenzie at IMDb
