= Heather Bolton =

New Zealand actress

- Born: ~1960-1961; New Zealand
- Occupation: Actress

Heather Bolton is a New Zealand actress. She won the 1986 National Mutual GOFTA Award for Best Female Performance in a Leading Role - Film for Mr Wrong, the 1987 Gofta Film and Television Award for Best Female Performance in a Supporting Role - Film for Arriving Tuesday and the 1988 Listener Film and Television Award for Best Female Performance in a Supporting Role - Film for Illustrious Energy.

Bolton played the lead role of Meg in Mr Wrong, She featured in Arriving Tuesday as Jenny and Illustrious Energy as Mrs Wong, and played Rose Anderson on Country G.P.. Other screen appearances include in the "Taxi Hijack" episode of Inside Straight

On stage Bolton has toured with Aunt Daisy in 1991 and from 1986 spent 16 months with the Melbourne Theatre Company In the 1990s she relocated to Australia where she has appeared in Smokescreens (Chapel off Chapel, 2002), Roulette (Chapel off Chapel, 2002). Miracles (Playbox, 1998), Speaking in Tongues (Playbox, 1998), She Came Shining (La Mama, 1999), and Shadow and Spendour (Playhouse, Adelaide Festival Centre, 1992).

Bolton studied at the New Zealand Drama school in 1980-81.
