= Robin Laing (producer) =

New Zealand film producer

Robin Laing MBE is a New Zealand film producer. She is the founding president of WIFT in New Zealand and also a founding chair of The New Zealand Film & Television School.

== Awards and nominations ==
- 1989 Chicago International Film Festival - Gold Plaque: Victory Over Death
- 1990 New Zealand Film Awards - Nominated for Best Film: Ruby and Rata
- 1993 MBE for "services to the New Zealand film industry"
- 2008 Great Southern Film & Television Award for Outstanding Contribution to the New Zealand Screen Industry

== Filmography ==
- Poppy (2021)
- The Heart Dances - the journey of The Piano: the ballet (2018)
- The Vintner's Luck (2009)
- The Making of Perfect Strangers (2004) Short
- Perfect Strangers (2003)
- Early Days Yet (2001) TV
- Stickmen (2001)
- Getting to Our Place (1999) TV
- Thinking About Sleep (1999) short
- Kiwiana - Kiwi As (1997) TV
- The Imploding Self: A Journey Through the Life of Fergus McLafferty (1995) short
- War Stories Our Mothers Never Told Us (1995)
- Flip & Two Twisters (1995) TV
- For Love or Money (1995) TV
- Putting Our Town on the Map (1995) TV
- Stroke (1993) short
- Work of Art (anthology series) (1993) TV
- The Making of Bread and Roses (1993) Subject
- Bread & Roses (1993)
- Matrons of Honour (1992) TV
- Absent Without Leave (1992)
- Married (1992) TV
- Mother Tongue (1992) TV
- Xmas for Lou (1992) TV
- Pleasures and Dangers (1991) TV
- Ruby and Rata (1990)
- Send a Gorilla (1988)
- Dangerous Orphans (1986)
- Mr Wrong/Dark of Night (1984)
- The Lost Tribe (1983) Wardrobe Supervisor
