= Yūko Tsushima =

Japanese fiction writer (1947–2016)

Satoko Tsushima
- 津島里子
- Tsushima in 1995
- Born: March 30, 1947; Mitaka, Tokyo, Allied-occupied Japan
- Died: February 18, 2016 (aged 68)
- Education: Shirayuri Women's University
- Occupation: Writer
- Writing career
- Pen name: 津島 佑子 (Tsushima Yūko)
- Language: Japanese
- Genre: Fiction
- Notable works: Hikari no ryōbun (光の領分); Kusa no Fushido (草の臥所); Hi no yama – yamazaruki (火の山―山猿記)
- Notable awards: Izumi Kyōka Prize for Literature; Noma Literary New Face Prize; Noma Literary Prize; Yomiuri Prize; Tanizaki Prize

Satoko Tsushima (津島 里子, Tsushima Satoko; 30 March 1947 – 18 February 2016), known by her pen name Yūko Tsushima (津島 佑子 Tsushima Yūko), was a Japanese fiction writer, essayist and critic. Tsushima won many of Japan's top literary prizes in her career, including the Izumi Kyōka Prize for Literature, the Noma Literary New Face Prize, the Noma Literary Prize, the Yomiuri Prize and the Tanizaki Prize. The New York Times called Tsushima "one of the most important writers of her generation." Her work has been translated into over a dozen languages.

== Early life ==
Tsushima was born in Mitaka, Tokyo, the third child (younger of two daughters) of famed novelist Osamu Dazai and Michiko Ishihara, a teacher at a girls' school. Her father committed suicide when she was one year old; she later drew on the aftermath of this experience in writing her short story "The Watery Realm".

== Career ==
While attending Shirayuri Women's University she published her first fiction. At age 24 she published her first collection of stories, Carnival (Shaniku-sai). A prolific writer, she was the winner of several literary prizes. In 1972 her story Pregnant with a Fox (Kitsune wo haramu) was a runner-up for the Akutagawa Prize. She was awarded the Izumi Kyōka Prize for Literature in 1977 for Kusa no Fushido (Bedchamber of Grass), and the first annual Noma Literary New Face Prize for Hikari no ryōbun (Territory of Light) in 1979. In 1983 she was awarded the Kawabata Yasunari Literature Prize for her short story Danmari ichi (The Silent Traders), and in 1986 she won the Yomiuri Prize for her novel Yoru no hikari ni owarete (Driven by the Light of the Night). In 1998 she was awarded the 34th Tanizaki Prize and the 51st Noma Literary Prize for her novel Hi no yama – yamazaruki (Mountain of Fire: Account Of A Wild Monkey). In 2002 she won the Osaragi Jiro Prize for Warai ookami (Laughing Wolf).

== Writing style ==
Tsushima's work is often characterized as feminist, though she did not apply this label to her own work. Her writing explores the lives of marginalized people, usually women, who struggle for control of their own lives against societal and family pressures. She has cited Tennessee Williams as a literary influence. Unlike many of her contemporaries, whose writing about women tended to assume a nuclear family, Tsushima wrote about women who had been abandoned by family members. Her stories, several of which draw on her own experience as a single mother, focus on the psychological impact of abandonment on those left behind.

== Works translated into English ==
- Child of Fortune (寵児, Chōji, 1978) (translation by Geraldine Harcourt)
- Territory of Light (光の領分, Hikari no ryōbun, 1979) (translation by Geraldine Harcourt)
- Woman Running in the Mountains (山を走る女, Yama wo hashiru onna, 1980) (translation by Geraldine Harcourt)
- The Shooting Gallery & Other Stories (射的ほか短編集, 1973–1984) (translation by Geraldine Harcourt)
- A Sensitive Season (発情期)
- South wind (南風)
- The Silent Traders (黙市)
- The Chrysanthemum Beetle (菊虫)
- Missing (行方不明)
- The Shooting Gallery (射的)
- Clearing the Thickets (草叢)
- An Embrace (抱擁)
- Laughing Wolf (笑い狼, Warai Okami, 2001) (Michigan Monograph Series in Japanese Studies, 73; translation by Dennis Washburn)
- Of Dogs and Walls (犬と塀について, inu to hei nitsuite , 2018),(translation by Geraldine Harcourt, Penguin Classics)
- Wildcat Dome(ヤマネコ・ドーム, Yama Neko Domu, 2013),(translation by Lisa Hofmann-Kuroda, Penguin Classics)
