= Pass It On (play) =

Play by Renée

Pass It On is the second play in a trilogy by New Zealand playwright Renée. The first play in the trilogy is Wednesday to Come, and the third is Jeannie Once. It takes place during the 1951 New Zealand waterfront dispute. Characters Cliff and Jeannie appeared as teenagers in Wednesday to Come.

== Background ==
The first performance was on 1 March 1986 by Theatre Corporate in Auckland, directed by Roger McGill. The play has been published by Playmarket. The name Pass It On references illegal pamphlets that were published with a request: 'Please pass this notice on'.

== Characters ==
- Nell – thirty-four, Cliff's wife
- Cliff – thirty-two
- Jeannie – thirty
- Gus – thirty-four

== Synopsis ==
The play begins in February 1951, at the beginning of the 1951 New Zealand waterfront dispute. Cliff is a waterside worker, and on strike. Jeannie and Gus are involved with the union, publishing a Bulletin, putting the waterside workers' views across due to emergency regulations preventing publication of anything supporting of them in mainstream media. The play traces the change in relationship between Cliff's wife, Nell, and Jeannie. The play culminates with a march to advertise a public meeting to get public support for the strikers.

The play is structured with 29 scenes with the use of voice overs, double scenes and a slow motion sequence in the 1986 Downstage Theatre production.

== Productions ==
| Location / Producer | Date | Crew | Cast | Sources |
|---|---|---|---|---|
| Theatre Corporate, Auckland | 1 March 1986 – 12 April 1986 | Director: Roger McGill Designer: Donald Grant Sutherland Lighting: Andrew Mayo | Nell: Jennifer Ward-Lealand Cliff: John Watson Jeannie: Judith Gibson Gus: Michael Hurst | |
| Hannah Playhouse / Downstage Theatre, Wellington | 18 April 1986 –17 May 1986 | Director: Phillip Mann | Jeannie: Jane Waddell Duncan Smith Danny Mulheron Brenda Kendall Simon O'Connor Michele Amas Liz Mullane Mark Wright | |

== Reception ==
Reviewers of the 1986 Downstage production said it showcased the skills of the writer, the performance were all 'impressive' and the play had a 'strong impact'.

Playmarket published in 1986 a schools study guide of Pass It On and Wednesday to Come in their ACT Magazine (v.11 n.3 Jun 1986).
