= Samuel Marsden Collegiate School =

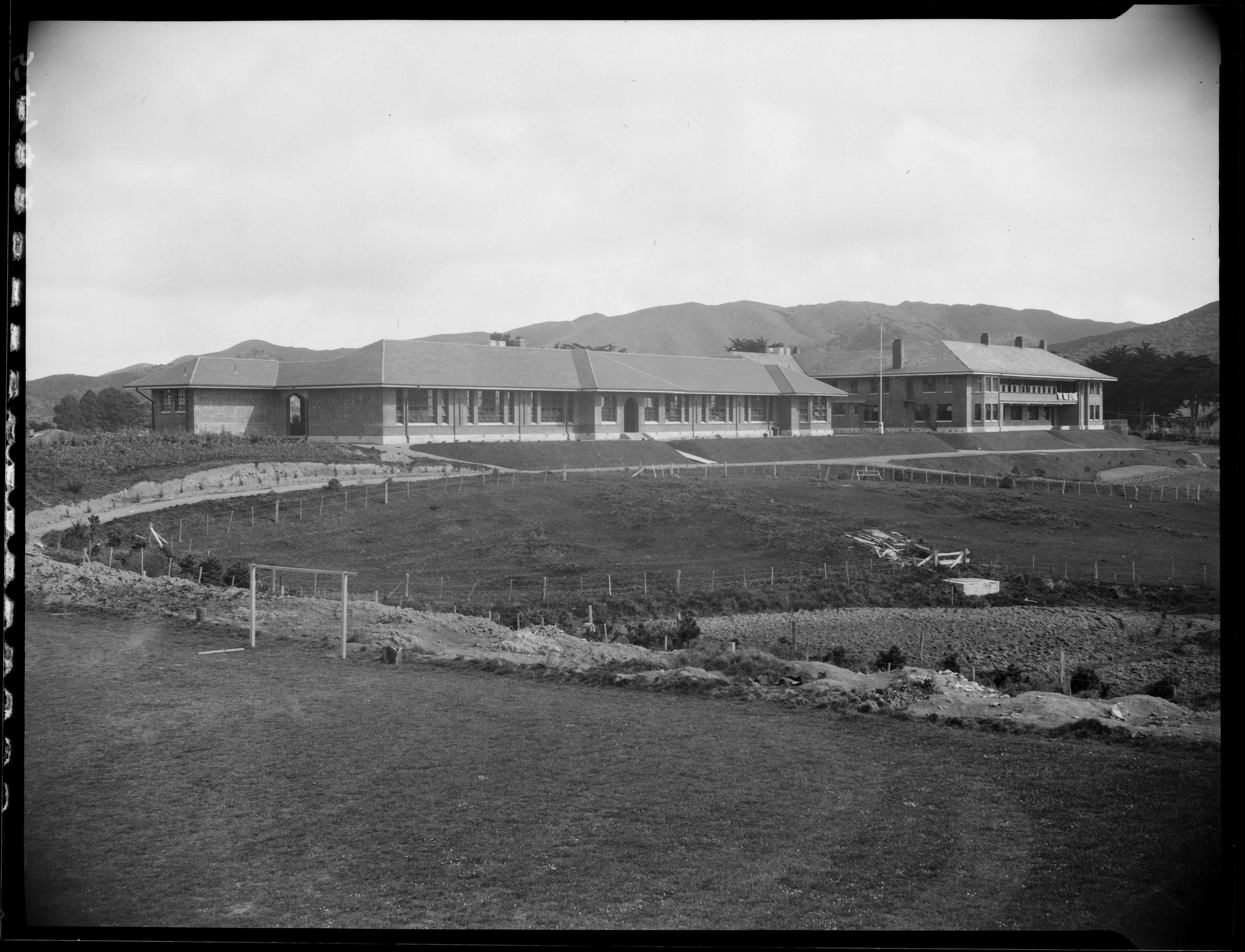
- Samuel Marsden Collegiate School buildings c. 1927

Location
- Marsden Avenue, Karori, Wellington; 41.283945°S 174.744353°E

Information
- Type: Private composite girls school, years 1–13
- Motto: Latin: Ad Summa (Aim For the Highest)
- Established: 1878; 148 years ago
- Ministry of Education Institution no.: 280
- Principal: Paula Wells
- Enrolment: 391
- Socio-economic decile: 10
- Website: marsden.school.nz

Samuel Marsden Collegiate School is a private girls school located in the Wellington suburb of Karori in New Zealand. It has a socio-economic decile of 10 – on a scale from 1 to 10, 10 reflecting the highest proportion of students from high socio-economic communities – and provides year one to 13 education for girls, with a co-educational pre-school.

== History ==
The school is named after the Anglican Missionary Samuel Marsden. It was established in 1878 by Mrs Mary Ann Swainson as a day and boarding school for girls from Wellington and the surrounding areas. The school was originally known as the Fitzherbert Terrace School, and Esther Mary Baber was for many years the headmistress. In 1920, the school was bought by the Anglican Diocese of Wellington, and moved to Karori in 1926. Samuel Marsden Collegiate has had 11 principals, only one of whom, Rev. Gerald Clark, has been male.

== Present day ==
In January 2022 Paula Wells became Samuel Marsden Collegiate School's 13th Principal taking over from Narelle Umbers who returned to Melbourne after 4 years in the role. Previously the school was led by Jenny Williams until 2017 and before that Gillian Eadie, who retired in 2008.

Marsden, as the school is often called, currently has around 500 students. In 2006 it was split from 3 to 4 'schools', the Marsden Primary (previously known as the Lower School), Middle School, Upper School and Senior School. Marsden now has five schools: Preschool, Marsden Primary, Middle School, Upper School and Senior School. In practice the latter three schools are treated as one, often just referred to as the 'upper school'.

The upper school consists of six houses: Swainson-Riddiford, Baber, Hadfield-Beere, Richmond, Jellicoe and Johnson, all named after friends and benefactors of the school. Girls are placed in houses arbitrarily except when closely related to an old girl, in which case they are placed in the same house as their relative. The Lower School (Marsden Primary) has three separate houses, Sprott, Innes and Fitzherbert, again reflecting the school's history.

Its exam results rank consistently in the top schools in New Zealand. Samuel Marsden Collegiate School students complete the New Zealand National Certificate of Educational Achievement (NCEA). The school was an early adopter of technology and won the New Zealand Computer Institutes Award for Excellence in the use of IT in Schools: Secondary and Primary in 2000.

== Marsden Whitby ==
Established as Whitby Independent College in January 2004, on the site of the old Duck Creek Golf Course, the school was subsequently bought by Samuel Marsden Collegiate School in 2005 and renamed Marsden Whitby. Marsden Whitby's houses bear no relation to the long history of the Karori school. Instead carrying the nautical theme that the suburb of Whitby is known for – Endeavour, Resolution, Discovery and Adventure. Marsden Whitby also differed from the older school because it was the only independent co-educational high school in the Wellington region.

On 1 July 2019 Samuel Marsden Collegiate School Trust Board announced it had made the decision to close Marsden School Whitby at the end of the 2019 school year.

On 9 August 2019 Fiso Group Ltd announced plans to acquire the school and rename it Whitby Collegiate with plans to start operating formally from the start of the school year in 2020. The sale of Marsden Whitby to Fiso Investment Group Ltd was finalised on 10 December 2019.

== Enrolment ==
As a private school, Samuel Marsden Collegiate School charges tuition fees to cover costs. For the 2025 school year, tuition fees for New Zealand residents are $22,588 per year for students in years 1 to 6, $29,012 per year for students in years 7 to 12, and $29,376 per year for students in year 13.

As of July 2026, the school has roll of 391 students, of which 15 (3.8%) identify as Māori. As a private school, the school is not assigned an Equity Index.

== Notable alumnae ==
- Noeline Baker (1878–1958), suffragist, wartime women's labour administrator, gardener and peace educator
- Lady June Blundell (1922–2012), community activism and welfare work
- Vidyamala Burch (born 1959), mindfulness teacher
- Madeleine Chapman (born 1994), editor for The Spinoff and North & South, Samoan cricketer and javelin thrower
- Anne Gambrill, New Zealand High Court judge
- Miranda Harcourt (born 1962), actress and acting coach
- Kate Hawley (born 1970s) costume designer international award winner
- Dame Bronwen Holdsworth (born 1943), businesswoman and arts patron
- Sue Kedgley (born 1948), New Zealand politician, campaigner for women's affairs, environmental and community issues
- Shirley Maddock (1928–2001), New Zealand's first television news writer, first television interviewer and first female television producer
- Katherine Mansfield (1888–1923), prominent New Zealand modernist short story writer
- Dr Diana Mason (1922–2007), obstetrician
- Fiamē Naomi Mataʻafa (born 1957), Prime Minister of Samoa
- Davida McKenzie (born 2006 or 2007), professional actress
- Thomasin McKenzie (born 2000), professional actress
- Sheilah Winn (1917–2001), arts patron and philanthropist
