= Mr. Wrong (1985 film) =

1985 New Zealand horror film

- Directed by: Gaylene Preston
- Written by: Gaylene Preston; Geoff Murphy
- Based on: Elizabeth Jane Howard story
- Produced by: Gaylene Preston; Robin Laing
- Starring: Heather Bolton; David Letch; Perry Piercy
- Cinematography: Thomas Burstyn
- Edited by: Simon Reece
- Music by: Jonathan Crayford
- Production company: Preston-Laing Productions
- Release date: 1985
- Running time: 88 minutes
- Country: New Zealand
- Language: English

Mr. Wrong is a 1985 New Zealand horror film, directed by Gaylene Preston. The film was based on an Elizabeth Jane Howard short story. It was released in the US as Dark of the Night.

== Synopsis ==
Meg moves to Wellington from a small town and buys a Jaguar car from a dealer. While driving to her parents' home for the weekend, she is troubled by supernatural phenomena, including strange sounds from the car and a dream of a woman walking in the rain. While in her home town, Meg reconnects with a former schoolmate, Wayne.

Driving back to the city in the rain, Meg offers a ride to a hitchhiker who seems to be the same woman from her dream. As the woman silently gets in the back seat she is immediately joined by an unnamed man who sits in the front passenger seat. His demeanour quickly makes Meg very uncomfortable, and while driving to a nearby service station she realises the woman has disappeared. When the man denies there was a woman in the back seat, Meg insists he get out of the car, and he exits angrily, seemingly vanishing. Meg begins to question her own sanity.

Meg works at an antique store, and while wrapping items in old newspapers she discovers an article about a Mary Carmichael, whose photograph Meg recognises as the female hitchhiker. Mary went missing years ago, and although bloodstains were discovered in her car, her body was never found. Meg is dismayed to find that her Jaguar's logbook indicates that Mary was its previous owner, and immediately puts the vehicle up for sale. However, she is unable to dispose of the car because of its ghostly behaviour: one caller's dog takes fright at the Jaguar, and the car refuses to unlock for another prospective buyer. Meanwhile, Meg begins to notice the male hitchhiker stalking her around town, but no one else is able to confirm her sightings.

One evening, Meg is home alone after her flatmate has gone to a party. Bruce, a lecherous ex-boyfriend of her flatmate, unexpectedly shows up and attempts to force himself on Meg, but Wayne arrives and helps her send Bruce away. Meg declines Wayne's offer to stay the night, and he departs. Later that night Meg hears a strange noise and goes to investigate. The stalker has broken into her flat and waits with a knife to attack her. Before he can do so, the car's horn suddenly sounds and Meg hurries outside to check it. The horn stops of its own accord, and Meg finds herself locked out of the house by the stalker. She decides to drive to Wayne's home, but is followed by a man driving a green car. She manages to elude the driver by speeding across a railway line in front of an oncoming train. It is then revealed that the other driver was the well-intentioned Wayne, while the stalker – who previously murdered Mary – is hiding in Meg's back seat. The killer tries to strangle Meg, but she burns him with the dashboard's cigarette lighter and flees the car on foot. Mary's ghost then takes control, locking her killer inside the car and driving the car off a bend where it catches fire, killing the man. Mary's ghost smiles at Meg before walking away and disappearing.

== Cast ==
- Heather Bolton as Meg
- David Letch as The Man (Mr Wrong)
- Perry Piercy as Mary Carmichael
- Suzanne Lee as Val
- Margaret Umbers as Samantha
- Danny Mulheron as Wayne Wright
- Gary Stalker as Bruce
- Michael Haigh as Mr Whitehorn
- Phillip Gordon as Clive (car salesman)
- Kate Harcourt as Meg's mother
- Rebecca Gibney as Clive's secretary

== Production ==
Mr. Wrong was the first film made by Preston-Laing Productions (Gaylene Preston and Robin Laing). Howard's original short story featured a grim conclusion with the protagonist murdered in her car by the killer; the film changed this for a more upbeat ending where justice is served.

== Reception ==
The film received positive reviews from New Zealand critics, with The Press calling it "an assured, gripping thriller" and Athina Tsoulis from Broadsheet saying "this film is witty and entertaining, and superbly shot." Overseas reviews were more mixed; the New York Times described it as "a mild effort" that "isn't quite sure whether it wants to be a chiller or a comedy." The Los Angeles Times said the film "may be vulnerable to the charge of silliness from time to time, but it leaves us wanting to see Preston's next film."

Helen Martin in New Zealand film, 1912-1996 wrote "The fairy-tale texture and comic touch ensure the film is no solemn feminist tract. The excitement of vicarious terror builds through well-crafted use of thriller conventions—prowling camera, noir lighting and production design, spooky soundtrack— and a carefully managed succession of red herrings reinforce the ideology. Unconventionally there is no violence or bloodletting until the explosive climax." She notes "Mr Wrong subverts the thriller to look at sexual violence towards women and at the 'Cinderella syndrome' of rescue by a Mr Right." William Dart from Rip It Up noted "Using the genre of the thriller, Mr Wrong is transformed into an allegorical tale of a pursued and persecuted heroine, even if Bolton is a refreshingly atypical heroine with her delightfully matter-of-fact performance. A thriller has its special demands in terms of pacing, and Preston meets these with considerable ease, the film culminating in a suspenseful final sequence worthy of Hitchcock."

Film historians have compared Mr. Wrong to Melanie Rodriga's Trial Run (1984), an earlier New Zealand thriller with feminist themes.

== Awards ==
- 1986 National Mutual GOFTA Awards (New Zealand)

Best Female Performance in a Leading Role - Film: Heather Bolton

Nominated for Best Film Score: Jonathan Crayford

- 1986 Créteil International Women's Film Festival (France)

Most Popular Film.
