= Melanie Rodriga =

New Zealand-Australian film maker, lecturer and author

Melanie Rodriga (née Read; born 30 September 1954) is a New Zealand-Australian film maker, lecturer, and author.

== Early life ==
Born in Kuala Lumpur, Malaysia, Rodriga was the third child of Daphne Mary (Billie) and Albert Thomas (Bertram) Read. She is of Eurasian (Malay-Chinese-Portuguese) ancestry on her mother's side and British ancestry on her father's side. Her father was a pianist arranger of the British Dance Band Era, playing with Bert Ambrose and Henry Hall, among others. The family moved from Malaysia to Sydney in 1961, and lived in the eastern suburb of Vaucluse. Rodriga graduated from Kambala CofE Foundation School for Girls in 1972. She then traveled to England where she studied filmmaking at Ravensbourne Polytechnic, Bromley, Kent.

== Early career ==
Rodriga's career began in Sydney in 1974 at the Australian Broadcasting Corporation, where she was trained in production management and film editing for both drama and documentary. Her first film as writer/director was the 1976 experimental short Curiosities. In 1979 she edited Witches and Faggots, Dykes and Poofters. This was one of the first documentaries about the lives of gay and lesbian people in Australia set against the backdrop of the first Sydney Mardi Gras and the arrests that followed. In 1980, having moved to New Zealand, Rodriga began writing and directing her first three short films: Second Sight, about Sally Rodwell and Deborah Hunt of theatre group Red Mole, Them's The Breaks, a documentary about street kids, and Hooks and Feelers, a short feature based on the Keri Hulme story.

== Later career ==
Rodriga's first feature-length film, Trial Run (1984), starred Annie Whittle and was edited by Finola Dwyer. It was the first film in New Zealand to be written and directed by a woman. Whittle's character relocates to a remote cottage which appears to be haunted by a previous occupant. Conceived by Rodriga as a feminist thriller, and seen by some critics as a feminist form of "Kiwi Gothic," Trial Run was feminist in its work practices as well as its ethos: twenty of the twenty-nine people on the production crew were women. Together with Gaylene Preston's Mr Wrong, Trial Run marked a turning point in New Zealand cinema. According to Barbara Cairns, "From this moment on, the centrality of the white, male hero, or anti-hero ... was if not displaced, then constantly undermined." Cairns argues that Rodriga's Trial Run was the more daring of the two films as it focused "not on the unknown, external danger to women, which the thriller uses most potently, but on threats within the family." In 1986-87 Rodriga directed three episodes of the seven-part TV series The Marching Girls. This pioneering series was conceived by actor-writer Fiona Samuel as a response to the lack of challenging female roles in New Zealand television. Rodriga's next feature, Send a Gorilla, was conceived and developed with three of her Marching Girl colleagues. Set on Valentine's Day, the film was a feminist critique of the commercialisation of Romance. The film is frenetic and has some fine comic moments, while having a serious feminist subtext. In the 1990s Rodriga focused on TV drama and documentary (and changed her surname to Rodriga early on in the decade). The People Next Door (1994) was New Zealand's first prime time documentary dealing with gay and lesbian culture. In 1997 Rodriga moved to Perth, Western Australia. While teaching screen production and screenwriting at Murdoch University, Rodriga directed her third feature film, Teesh and Trude (2002) starring Linda Cropper, Susie Porter, Peter Phelps and Bill McCluskey. Teesh and Trude tells the story of a day in the life of two working-class single mums in Perth, Western Australia. The film was nominated for three Australian Film Institute Awards in 2003. Critics were divided by the film's gritty social realism:

This is a story that won't appeal to viewers who live similar lives or take refuge in sudsers such as Neighbours, which looks like a sugar-frosted Cinderella fantasy compared with this. Strong humanity and even a faint sense of optimism emerge in the final reel as the women assert themselves against the innate bullying and objectification that has been their lot and downfall. It isn't Ken Loach or Mike Leigh but it's in that ambit and the acting is very gritty - Linda Cropper's Trude and Susie Porter's Teesh radiate desperation that is almost palpable and Peter Phelps, as the blustering no-hoper Rod, delivers a penetrating observation of a type that is frighteningly accurate

— Doug Anderson, The Age Newspaper

In 2010, Rodriga wrote, directed and produced her fourth feature film myPastmyPresent, shot on location in the Margaret River region of Western Australia. myPastmyPresent is a young lesbian love story with Buddhist themes shot with an entirely undergraduate crew. It played at the 16th Seattle Lesbian & Gay Film Festival. In 2015 the feature film 'Pinch' (w/d Jeffory Asselin) which Rodriga executive produced, won best feature at the WA Screen Awards.

== Academics ==
Rodriga has a PhD from Murdoch University in Perth, where she ran the Graduate Screen Program].

== Personal life ==
Rodriga's sexual orientation as fluid. She is a lesbian and queer as of 2018. She has written that she disagrees with "the assumption that sexuality is biologically or genetically driven" and believes in "allowing young people the freedom to make up their own minds about their sexual preference(s)."

== Filmography ==
Year	Title	Type	Notes
1976	Curiosities	Short film	Director, writer
1977	Tinker, Taylor, Soldier, Sailor	Documentary	Editor
1977	The Man who Broke the Bank	Documentary	Editor
1979	Witches and Faggots, Dykes and Poofters	Documentary	Editor
1980	Wild South	Documentary	Editor
1981	Them's the Breaks	Documentary	Director, writer, producer, and editor
1981	Second Sight	Documentary	Director, writer, producer, and editor
1982	Hooks and Feelers	Short film	Director, writer
1984	Trial Run	Feature film	Director, writer
1985	The Minders	Short film	Director, editor
1986/87	Marching Girls	TV	Director
1988	Send a Gorilla	Feature film	Director. Nominated for 3 New Zealand Film and TV Awards
1991	New Zealand Rivers Waikato	Documentary	Director, editor
1993	Standing in the Sunshine	Documentary	Director
1994	Once a Convent Girl	Documentary	Director
1994	TrueLife Stories: The Pip Brown Story	Short film	Director, writer
1994	The People Next Door	Documentary	Director, writer
2002	Teesh and Trude	Feature film	Nominated for 3 Australian Film Institute Awards; director, producer and script consultant
2010–2011	myPastmyPresent	Feature film	Director, writer, editor and producer

== Reviews ==
- Film Ink Review of Teesh & Trude by Drew Turney
- SBS Movie Show Review of Teesh & Trude
- Variety Review of Teesh & Trude by David Stratton
