= Bliss (2011 film) =

- Written by: Fiona Samuel
- Directed by: Fiona Samuel
- Starring: Kate Elliott
- Music by: Don McGlashan
- Country of origin: New Zealand
- Original language: English

Production
- Producer: Michele Fantl
- Cinematography: Dave Cameron
- Editor: Margot Francis
- Running time: 96 min

Original release
- Network: TV One
- Release: 28 August 2011

Bliss is a 2011 New Zealand television film written and directed by Fiona Samuel. It is about the early life of writer Katherine Mansfield. It features Kate Elliott as Mansfield. It received nine nominations in the 2012 New Zealand Television Awards, winning three awards.

== Cast ==
- Kate Elliott as Katherine Mansfield
- Sarah Peirse as Annie Beauchamp
- Elliott McKee as Garnet Trowell
- Julia Croft as Ida Baker
- Ian Hughes as George Bowden
- Simon London as Floryan Sobieniowski
- Peter Elliott as Harold Beauchamp
- Tandi Wright as Lily Trowell

== Reception ==
Michele Hewitson in The New Zealand Herald said "KE played KM flawlessly, which means that, according to this story, she played her to maximum irritating effect. This KM is a real pain in the bum and I found myself wishing that somebody would give her a good slapping." She concluded "It made for good-looking television at least." Trevor Agnew of the Press wrote "Bliss didn't waste money on crowd scenes or elaborate sets. Instead the budget went on costumes, hats and wigs that seemed just right for the characters." Later reviewing the DVD he said "A solid cast turns Fiona Samuel's script into a convincing portrait of an ebullient young woman bursting free of convention and finding her true talent."

== Awards ==
2012 New Zealand Film and Television Awards

- Best Director - Drama/Comedy: Fiona Samuel
- Best Editing - Drama/Comedy: Margot Francis
- Best Original Music: Don McGlashan
