= Renée (writer) =

New Zealand feminist writer and playwright (1929–2023)

Renée ONZM
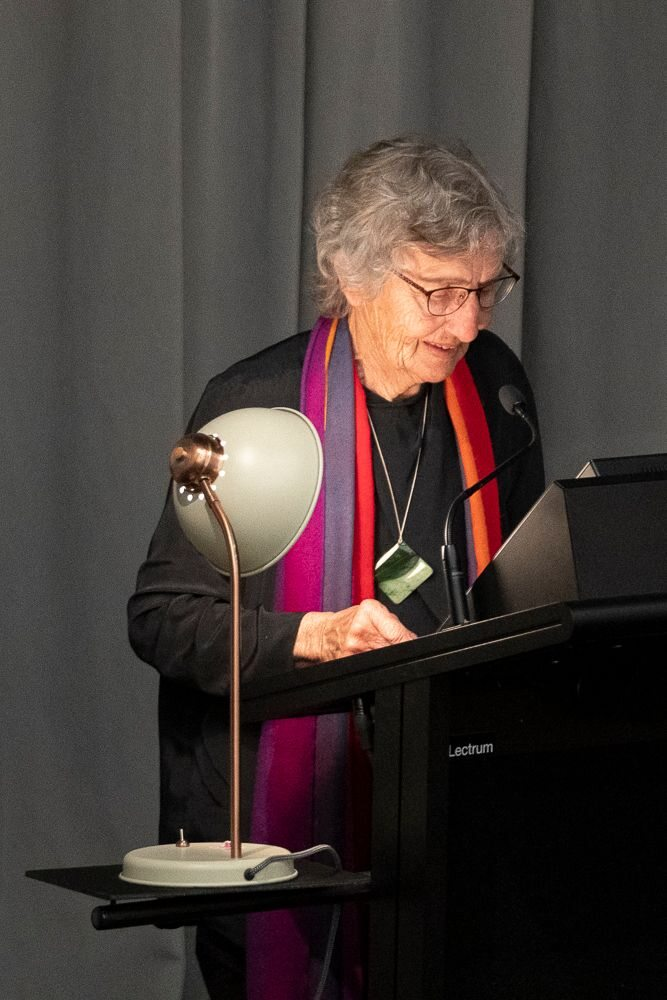
- Renée in 2021
- Born: Renée Gertrude Jones; 19 July 1929; Napier, New Zealand
- Died: 11 December 2023 (aged 94); Wellington, New Zealand
- Other name: Renée Taylor
- Education: University of Auckland (BA)
- Occupations: Playwright; novelist; short story writer
- Notable work: Wednesday to Come (1984); Pass It On (1986)
- Children: 3
- Awards: Prime Minister's Award for Literary Achievement in Fiction (2018)

Renée Gertrude Taylor ONZM (née Jones; 19 July 1929 – 11 December 2023), known professionally as Renée, was a New Zealand feminist writer, playwright, novelist and short story writer. She started writing plays in her 50s, with her first play, Setting the Table, written in 1981, and with her most well-known works being the trilogy of plays beginning with Wednesday to Come (1984). Renée described herself as a "lesbian feminist with socialist working-class ideals", and her plays feature strong female characters who are often working class.

Renée wrote into her 90s, and in addition to over twenty plays wrote short stories and novels in a range of genres including family life, romance and crime, and an autobiography in 2017. She received a number of notable awards during her career, including the Prime Minister's Award for Literary Achievement in Fiction in 2018.

== Early life ==
Renée was born in Napier, New Zealand, on 19 July 1929. She was of Māori (Ngāti Kahungunu), Irish, English, and Scottish ancestry. Her mother was Māori and her father was Pākehā (New Zealand European); he committed suicide when she was four years old. Renée's mother taught Renée to read at an early age.

Renée attended Greenmeadows School in Napier, and enjoyed participating in two or three plays at school. Renée had hoped to stay in school, but had to leave at the age of 12 to work in the local woollen mills and then a printing factory; she had been asked by her mother to start work in order to enable her two younger siblings to attend high school.

In later years, she said that she "never got over" not going to high school and that the absence of friends her own age was in part what led to her love of reading. Her early favourite works included Anne of Green Gables and books by Agatha Christie and Dorothy L. Sayers.

She married at age 19 and had three sons, and at the time worked at a chemist's shop. Her marriage ended in 1981, when she entered into a long-term relationship with a woman. It was around this time, which coincided with the start of her writing career, that Renée chose to use only her first name as her professional name; she explained that this was because it was the name her mother gave her and the only name she felt was hers. She said she did not realise it was a political statement at the time.

== Early writing career and education ==
Renée began writing short stories, reviews and humorous columns for newspapers around age 30 when her three children were young. She also began acting for the Napier Repertory Theatre. For twenty years she directed and performed in plays for several theatrical groups and schools in the Hawke's Bay area.

When Renée started in theatre, she began reading more works by New Zealand authors. By discovering the bilingual magazine Te Ao Hou, she came across authors like Jacquie Sturm and Rowley Habib. In 2021, recalling this time, she said: "at last I was reading about the people and the country I knew".

While studying extra-murally at Massey University, Renée began working as an English and history teacher at Wairoa College. In 1979, ten years after starting her degree studies at the age of 40, Renée completed her Bachelor of Arts at University of Auckland. She said she began becoming interested in feminist thinking and literature while studying in Auckland, and she was also influenced by attending the United Women's Convention in Wellington in 1975, where she realised that "a lot of the things I thought and felt resentful about were things other women thought and felt too."

During her time studying, Renée worked as a cleaner at Auckland's Theatre Corporate. Six years later, she returned to the Theatre Corporate as a Playwright in Residence. She went on to write many plays which feature women and working-class people in leading roles, and described herself as a "lesbian feminist with socialist working-class ideals".

== Writing career: 1981–2000 ==
Renée began writing plays in her 50s; her first play, Setting the Table, was written in 1981. She began writing it on New Year's Day in 1981, and the first draft was completed in five days. It features working-class, lesbian and Māori characters. In a 1982 interview with New Zealand feminist magazine Broadsheet, Renée explained that her goal was to write a play with strong, intelligent and funny female characters with political themes.

She was a pioneering figure for women in the New Zealand theatre landscape. Fellow New Zealand playwright, Lorae Parry, has said:

Renée opened the stage door and strode in, announcing her arrival and standing centre stage. She opened the door with a bang, not with a whimper and many of us followed. It was time. Someone needed to do it. Renée had the guts.

Renée's best-known plays form a trilogy, beginning with Wednesday to Come (1984) which shows the effect on a family of the 1930s Great Depression in New Zealand. It was performed for the first time at the Downstage Theatre. In the play, four generations of women must deal with the consequences of a male family member's suicide. The play is set around a coffin and features scones being baked live on stage. The second play, Pass It On (1986), follows the two children in Wednesday to Come now that they have grown up and married. It celebrates the role of working-class women in the 1951 New Zealand waterfront dispute.

The third and final play of the trilogy, Jeannie Once (1991), is a prequel to Wednesday to Come about the life of Wednesday to Come's Granna as a seamstress in 1890s Dunedin. One of the characters in Jeannie Once is a Māori servant, Martha, who ends up being committed to a mental asylum. Jeannie Once features elements of music hall. A 1994 review in Hecate described it as "in many respects, stronger and more complex" than the first two plays, exploring New Zealand's history and the role of women in families; it criticised the play however for being "too safe" and not strongly confronting feminist issues.

In 1988, Renée was invited to attend the First International Women Playwrights Conference in New York as one of three keynote speakers. She also attended the Pacific Writers Conference in London and took part in a reading tour of Britain and Europe together with Patricia Grace.

In addition to her plays, Renée also wrote a short-story collection, Finding Ruth (1987), and three novels in the 1990s which all feature themes of non-traditional families. In 1998 she published Let's Write Plays, a textbook for high school students, and the essay collection Yin and Tonic. She held the Robert Burns Fellowship in 1989, and was the writer-in-residence at the University of Waikato in 1995.

Many of Renée's plays have been published and anthologised, both in New Zealand and overseas; extracts of her work were included in Te Ao Marama (volume 1, 1990) edited by Witi Ihimaera, and in Intimate Acts (1997), a collection of lesbian plays published by Brito and Lair, New York.

== Later life and death: 2000–2023 ==
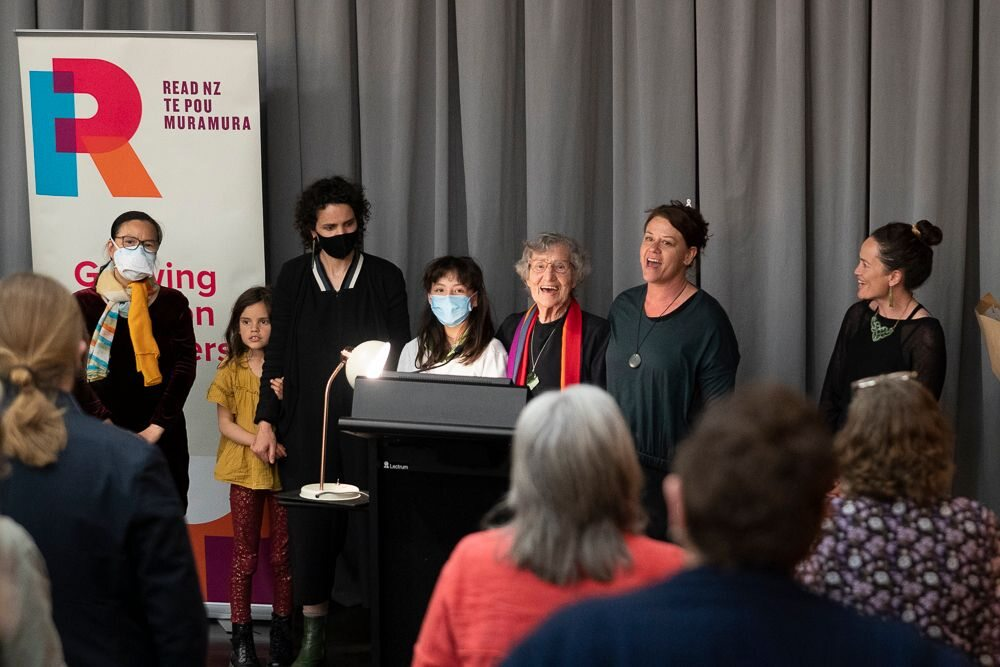
Renée sings a waiata with her family at the Read NZ Te Pou Muramura Pānui in 2021

Renée continued to write into her later years, with novels written in her 70s including The Skeleton Woman: A Romance (2002) and Kissing Shadows (2006). She held the Randell Cottage Writers' Residency in 2005, and the University of Otago's Children's Writers' Residency in 2007. In October 2017 her memoir These Two Hands was published by Mākaro Press.

In her 80s Renée began writing crime fictions and teaching workshops on how to write it. This led to two crime novels, The Wild Card (published in the year of her 90th birthday, 2019) and Blood Matters (2022). Both crime novels were shortlisted for the Ngaio Marsh Award for Best Crime Novel. Her plays continue to be read and performed; in 2019 the trilogy beginning with Wednesday to Come was published in a single volume by Victoria University Press as a VUP Classic, and a revival of the first play was staged at the Circa Theatre in 2022. In 2021 she delivered the annual Pānui lecture for Read NZ Te Pou Muramura, at age 92.

Renée was a resident of Ōtaki until she moved to a rest home in October 2023. She died in Wellington on 11 December 2023, at age 94. Shortly after her death The Spinoff published a series of tributes to Renée from Patricia Grace, Mary McCallum, Matariki Williams and many other New Zealand writers and readers.

== Honours and awards ==
Renée received the Queen Elizabeth II Arts Council Literary Fund Playwrights Award for 1986, then the largest award available for playwrights in New Zealand worth $10,000. Peter Tapsell, then New Zealand's Minister for the Arts, described her as one of the most distinguished playwrights in New Zealand. Later in that year, she was separately awarded a Literary Fund bursary worth $10,000 to work on her first novel.

In the 2006 Queen's Birthday Honours, Renée was appointed an Officer of the New Zealand Order of Merit, for services to literature and drama. In 2013 she was awarded the Ngā Tohu ā Tā Kingi Ihaka at the Creative New Zealand Te Waka Toi awards for her lifetime contribution to Māori art.

In 2017 she received the Playmarket Award, a $20,000 prize recognising a playwright who has made a significant artistic contribution to theatre in New Zealand. In 2018 she received the Prime Minister's Award for Literary Achievement in Fiction, worth $60,000 and presented by Jacinda Ardern.

== Selected works ==
=== Plays ===
- 1981 Setting the Table
- 1982 Secrets
- 1982 Breaking Out
- 1982 What Did You Do in the War, Mummy? (Broadsheet revue)
- 1983 Dancing
- 1983 The MCP Show
- 1983 Asking for It (Broadsheet revue)
- 1984 Wednesday to Come
- 1985 Groundwork
- 1986 Pass It On
- 1987 Born to Clean
- 1990 Touch of the Sun
- 1990 Missionary Position
- 1991 Jeannie Once
- 1991 Te Pouaka Karaehe (The Glass Box)
- 1992 Tiggy Tiggy Touch Wood
- 1992 Pink Sports and Mountain Tops
- 1993 Form
- 1993 Heroines, Hussies and High, High Flyers
- 1994 Dreaming in Ponsonby
- 2010 Shall We Gather at the River

=== Fiction ===
- 1987 Finding Ruth (short story collection)
- 1990 Willy Nilly
- 1993 Daisy and Lily
- 1995 Does This Make Sense to You?
- 1997 The Snowball Waltz
- 1997 I Have to Go Home
- 2002 The Skeleton Woman: A Romance
- 2005 Kissing Shadows
- 2019 The Wild Card
- 2022 Blood Matters

=== Other works ===
- 1998 Let's Write Plays (textbook)
- 2017 These Two Hands (autobiography)
