= Territory of Light =

1979 novel by Yuko Tsushima

- Author: Yuko Tsushima
- Translator: Geraldine Harcourt
- Language: Japanese
- Genre: Literary fiction
- Publisher: Kodansha (Japanese); Farrar, Straus and Giroux (English)
- Publication date: 1979 (Japan); February 12, 2019 (English)
- Publication place: Japan
- Pages: 229 (Japanese); 192 (English)
- Awards: Lindsley and Masao Miyoshi Translation Prize
- ISBN: 978-4061962415
- Preceded by: 氷原 (Ice Field)
- Followed by: 最後の狩猟 (Last Hunt)

Territory of Light (光の領分, Hikari no ryōbun) is a novel by Yūko Tsushima, originally serialized in twelve parts in Gunzo from 1978 to 1979 and subsequently published by Kodansha in 1979. In Japan, it went on to win many prizes including the inaugural Noma Literary New Face Prize. In 2019, three years after Tsushima's death, an English translation by Geraldine Harcourt was published by Farrar, Straus and Giroux. It won the Lindsley and Masao Miyoshi Translation Prize.

== Synopsis ==
The novel follows a woman after her husband has left her. Together, she and her two-year-old daughter move into an apartment in Tokyo. In twelve chapters originally serialized in Gunzo, the novel follows their lives over the length of a year. The title of the novel is based on the first chapter's title, but is also symbolic of how the main character's life and mental health deteriorate throughout the novel. In one chapter, water-proof paint is added to the roof, restricting access there, and in another, mesh is put over some windows, making less sunlight flow in.

== Critical reception ==
In addition to winning the Lindsley and Masao Miyoshi Translation Prize, Harcourt's English translation was a finalist for the Best Translated Book Award and the Kirkus Prize. It was recommended in several publications including Vulture and LitHub.

In a starred review, Kirkus Reviews called it a "lovely, melancholy novel" and wrote that "Each chapter is as elegant and self-contained as a pearl or a perfectly articulated drop of water."

In The Atlantic, Rowan Hisayo Buchanan noted Tsushima's careful mastery and subsequent exceeding of how autofiction, or specifically the I-novel form in Japan, is typically written and read.

Zyzzyva called the novel "a tender and relatable story, highlighting both the obstacles and highlights of a transitional stage in life." The Spectator Australia remarked on the strength of Tsushima's voice, especially in its approach to hardships stemming from her own life. LitHub wrote that "Tsushima explores in the lives of women without sentimentality or self-pity, and with a honesty that is eeriely modern. It is a quiet and powerful book." Financial Times said that "Yuko Tsushima’s writing creates a studied, private world, as certain as the closure of a bedroom door" and compared the novel to The Days of Abandonment by Elena Ferrante. Star Tribune wrote: "Deceptively simple and remarkably timely, her story of a marginalized woman trying to cope with the trials of life is certain to entrance a whole new readership and pave the way for further translations of her strangely mesmerizing work." The Guardian noted that "In this short, powerful novel lurk the joy and guilt of single parents everywhere."
