= Miranda Harcourt =

New Zealand actress (born 1962)

Dame Miranda Harcourt DNZM
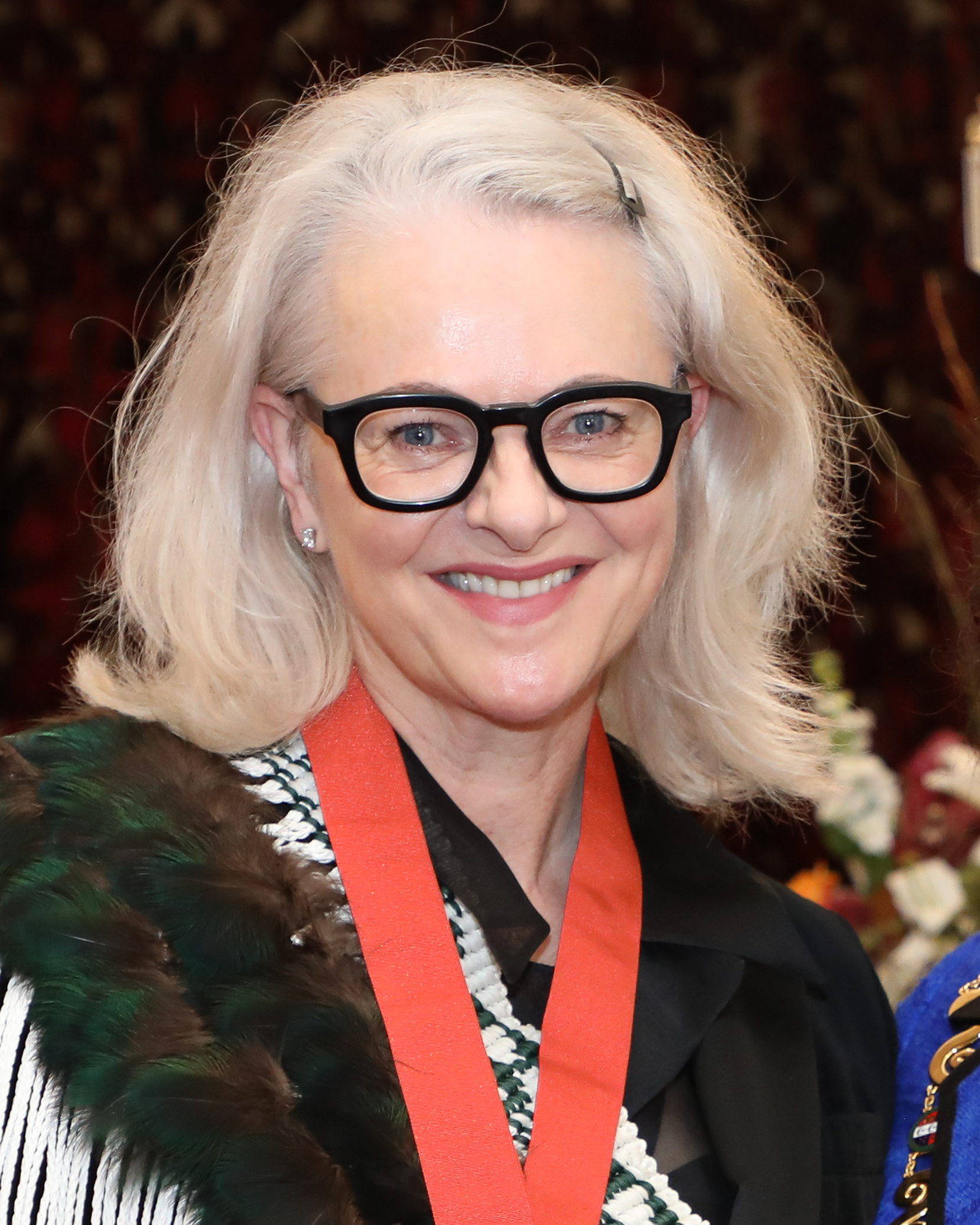
- Harcourt in 2023
- Born: Miranda Catherine Millais Harcourt; 1962 (age 63–64); Wellington, New Zealand
- Occupations: Actress, acting coach
- Years active: 1982–present
- Spouse: Stuart McKenzie
- Children: 3, including Thomasin and Davida
- Mother: Kate Harcourt
- Relatives: Geraldine Harcourt (cousin)

Dame Miranda Catherine Millais McKenzie DNZM (née Harcourt; born 1962) is a New Zealand actress and acting coach. Her career began playing boy characters on Radio New Zealand in the early 1970s. She is best known for her role as Gemma in the 1980s TV drama series Gloss. Harcourt spent three years acting on the show, and her character was so despicable that people spat at and insulted Harcourt in public. Harcourt received a nomination in the 1989 Film and TV Awards for best actress for the role.

== Biography ==
Harcourt is the daughter of Dame Kate Harcourt (née Fulton) and Peter Harcourt. Her younger brother Gordon Harcourt was a presenter on Fair Go. Harcourt graduated from Toi Whakaari, New Zealand Drama School, in 1984. Harcourt was part of a PEP scheme under Darcy Nicholas at the Willis Street Wellington Arts Centre directed by Colin McColl in a play.

In 1990, a sponsored year at London's Central School of Speech and Drama led to an exploration of drama therapy in psychiatric institutions, with the deaf, and in prisons – the latter inspiring her collaboration with writer William Brandt for the solo play Verbatim, where Harcourt acted, solo, portraying nine characters, inmates' relatives, and victims' families.

Harcourt was also a pioneer of verbatim theatre in New Zealand, in creating Verbatim (1993), in collaboration with William Brandt and Portraits (1997) in collaboration with Stuart McKenzie. Performed in front of people convicted of violent crimes, Harcourt says Verbatim "was a reflection back at the people on the inside; what their mothers, their sisters and their children had said about them". The show was well received in New Zealand theatres, at the Edinburgh Fringe Festival, and from the inmates themselves. Harcourt recollected one inmate, a year after the show, asking her where the other actresses were who had starred, having remembered the distinct characters that Harcourt portrayed solo so distinctly that he remembered them as separate, individual women. The Sunday Star-Times described Verbatim as "a small miracle of dramatic theatre". The NZ Times said Harcourt's performance was "frightening in its stamina and emotional range". In The Guardian, reviewer Michael Billington praised Verbatim as "a remarkable solo show about violence.”

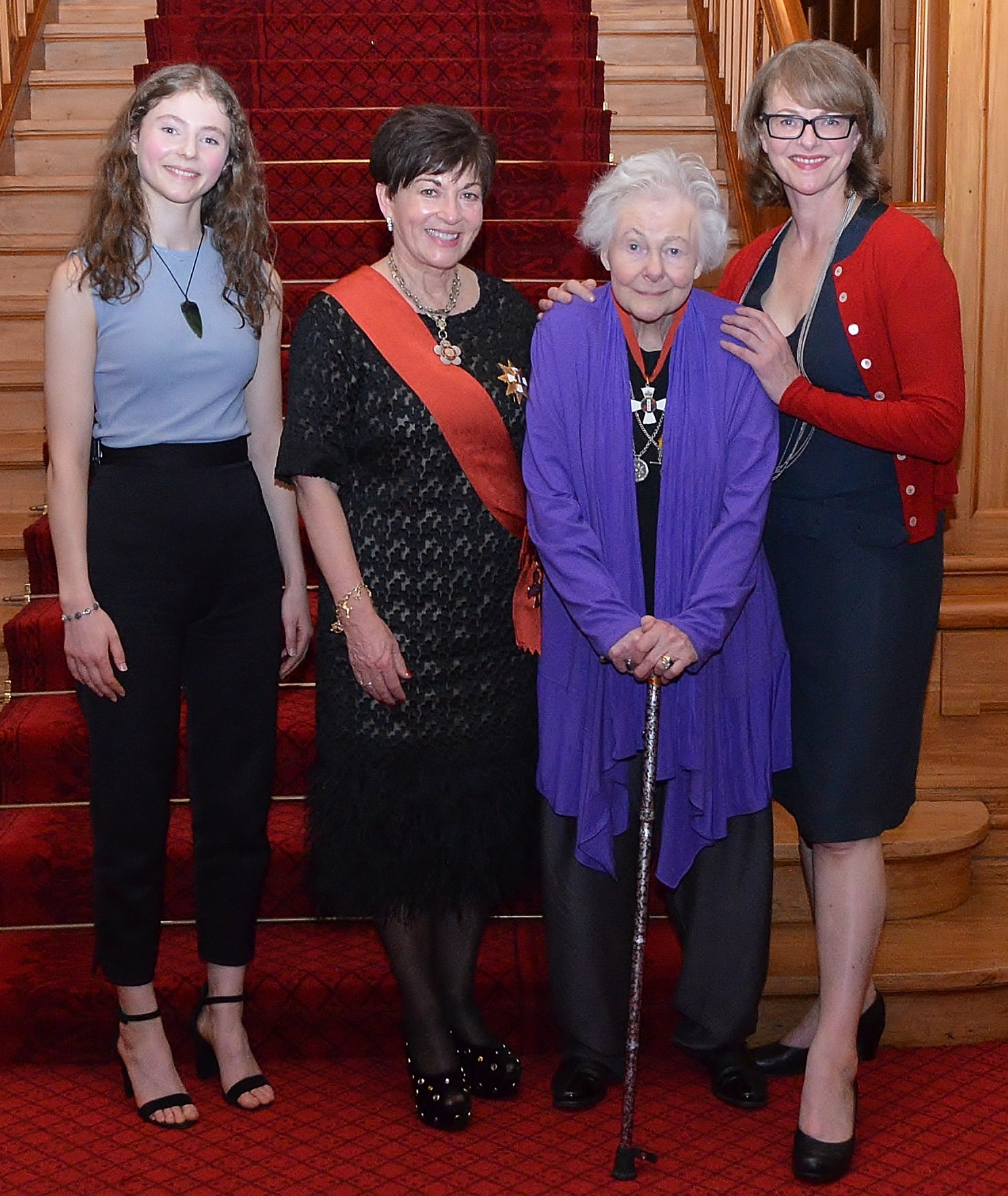
Harcourt (right), at a dinner at Government House, Wellington, on 19 September 2018, to celebrate the 125th anniversary of women's suffrage in New Zealand. Also present are Harcourt's daughter, Thomasin McKenzie (left), her mother, Dame Kate Harcourt (second from right), and the governor-general, Dame Patsy Reddy.

Harcourt and her mother appeared together in Flowers From My Mother's Garden, a collection of shared anecdotes, reminiscences and stories centered on their relationship and family, and co-written by Harcourt and her husband, Stuart McKenzie. The play was commissioned by the 1998 International Festival of the Arts and has been staged in Auckland, Dunedin and Christchurch.

Harcourt is married to Stuart McKenzie. Together they have three children: Peter (born 1998), Thomasin (born 2000), and Davida (born 2006).

=== Directing ===
Harcourt's first short film as a director, Voiceover, written and produced by husband Stuart McKenzie, won Best Short Film at the 1997 NZ Film and Television Awards, and her first play as a director won several awards at the Chapman Tripp Theatre Awards including Best Actor and Best Set Design.

=== Production ===
Harcourt is a partner in the company MAP Film Productions, alongside McKenzie and producer/director Neil Pardington. She has appeared in short films directed by each, including Pardington's The Dig (which was invited to Cannes as part of a special NZ showcase) and McKenzie's darkly comic Ends Meat'. She also executive produced the short A&E (Accident & Eternity) in 2006, and co-produced For Good in 2003.

=== Teaching and coaching ===
Harcourt is currently an acting technique tutor for The Actors Program, Auckland, New Zealand. She was the Head of Acting at Toi Whakaari, New Zealand Drama School, for seven years, and is widely acknowledged for her contributions to the school.

As well as coaching NZ actors and casts, Harcourt has expanded her professional scope to include overseas actors in Australia and America, including AnnaSophia Robb and Carrie Underwood. As part of her role on the board of Film New Zealand, she also helps to market New Zealand actors to overseas film-makers.

Harcourt was the acting coach on a number of international and local feature films, including Bridge to Terabithia (Best Actress 2008 Young Artist Awards as well as Best Ensemble Cast) directed by Gabor Csupo, Jane Campion's Bright Star (in competition for the 2009 Palme d'Or), Peter Jackson's The Lovely Bones and Heavenly Creatures, Jonathan King's Under the Mountain (Best Foreign Actress China's Golden Lion), Gaylene Preston's Home By Christmas (London Film Festival 2010), Yvonne MacKay's TV series Kaitangata Twitch (finalist for the 2010 Prix de Jeunesse, platinum winner WorldFest Houston), and Taika Waititi's Boy (Sundance 2010, winner Best Film NZFTV Awards 2010). Harcourt also teaches Professional Level – Teen Acting for Stage and Screen, as the head tutor at Scots College Creative and Performing Arts School.

== Honours and awards ==
In 1993, Harcourt received the New Zealand Suffrage Centennial Medal, and in the 2002 Queen's Birthday and Golden Jubilee Honours, she was appointed an Officer of the New Zealand Order of Merit, for services to theatre and the community.

Harcourt has twice been awarded Best Actress at the Chapman Tripp Theatre Awards (A Doll's House and Biography of my Skin). She has won New Zealand Film and TV Awards for Best Short Film (Voice Over) and was a finalist as Best Actress (Act of Murder and Gloss) and as Best Supporting Actress (Duggan and For Good (2003)). Harcourt has received the Media Peace Prize (Verbatim). She was also nominated for Best Performance by a Supporting Actress, a General TV Award, for Tangiwai in 2011. In 2014, Harcourt was named NEXT Woman of the Year in the Arts & Culture category.

In 2018, Harcourt received the Art and Culture Award at the New Zealand Women of Influence Awards. In the same year, she received the Award for Achievement in Film at the Women in Film and Television New Zealand Awards.

In the 2023 New Year Honours, Harcourt was promoted to Dame Companion of the New Zealand Order of Merit, for services to the screen industry and theatre.

== Filmography ==
- The Rehearsal, Livia, 2016.
- The Hobbit: The Battle of the Five Armies (Film), Olga, 2014.
- Passion in Paradise (TV Series), Elaine Williams, 2011.
- Rage (Film), Fran Oram, 2011.
- Tangiwai: A Love Story (TV movie), Mabel Love, 2011.
- Paradise Cafe (TV series), Victoria, 2009 – 2011. Appears in 24 episodes.
- Dangerous Ride (Short) 2010.
- Until Proven Innocent (TV movie), Dr Patricia Sullivan, 2009.
- Fracture, Irene Rosser, 2004.
- The Strip (TV series), Natalie, 2003.
- Something Fishy, Natalie, 2003.
- For Good, Mother, 2003.
- City Life (TV series), Rebekah Tennant, 1996. (Appears in 5 episodes).
- Hairy Maclary (TV Series), Narrator (voice), 1995.
- Riding High (TV series), Annabel, 1995. Appears in 7 episodes.
- The Dig (Short), Daughter, 1994.
- Typhon's People (TV movie), Hilary Gladstone, 1993.
- Shortland Street (TV series), Madeline Trent (2000), 1992.
- The Shadow Trader (TV mini-series), Joanna McCarthy, 1989.
- Send a Gorilla, Kerry-Anne, 1988.
- Gloss (TV series), Gemma, 1987.
- Bad Blood, Ivy Smith, 1981.
- Harcourt also starred in the 1996 documentary In the Shadow of King Lear and appeared in archival footage as herself in two instances; Happy Birthday 2 You (2000 TV special), and Look Who's Famous Now (1999 TV movie).
