= New Zealand Film Commission =

New Zealand government agency supporting local film production

- Type: Incentive
- Te Tumu Whakaata Taonga (Māori)

Autonomous Crown entity overview
- Formed: 1982
- Minister responsible: Paul Goldsmith, Minister for Arts, Culture and Heritage

The New Zealand Film Commission (NZFC; Māori: Te Tumu Whakaata Taonga) is a New Zealand government agency formed to assist with creating and promoting New Zealand films. It was established under the New Zealand Film Commission Act 1978 (as amended in 1981, 1985, 1988, 1994 and 1999).

== Functions and responsibilities ==
The New Zealand Film Commission is a Crown entity working to grow the New Zealand film industry. Its statutory responsibility is to encourage, participate and assist in the making, promotion, distribution and exhibition of films made in New Zealand.

Through the financing and administration of incentive schemes it has been involved in more than 300 feature films including Boy, Goodbye Pork Pie, Heavenly Creatures, The Lord of the Rings, The Hobbit, Avatar, Whale Rider and Mr. Pip.

It is also involved in some television series.

=== Film financing and marketing ===
The NZFC assists New Zealand filmmakers by providing grants, loans and equity financing in the development and production of feature films and short films. It administers the Government's Large Budget Screen Production Grant (LBSPG) and Screen Production Incentive Fund (SPIF) and certifies New Zealand films for tax purposes and co-productions. It also actively markets New Zealand films and filmmakers, and organises high-profile New Zealand participation at major international film festivals and markets. It helps with training and career development within the industry by partnering with other industry organisations.

For example, in 2010 the NZFC unveiled a new programme for funding films by filmmakers at the beginning of their careers who have creative ideas for their first feature film specifically designed for low-budget films. ("Directors who have previously received feature film finance from the NZFC" are ineligible.") Called Escalator, the scheme encourages teams, preferably including "their director, writer, producer and possibly a key crew member" to "submit three different proposals for a low budget ([NZ]$250,000) feature film." From those applications, 12 teams are selected to participate in a multi-day "bootcamp" after which they are expected to "prepare a script, production budget, schedule and statement of approach for one of their ideas." Peter Jackson praised the proposal for its "speed or process," reminding his readers that "much frustration has resulted from the slow pace at which a project limps through development at the NZFC."

In fact, the first film to be released with Escalator support was Existence (2012; directed by Juliet Bergh; co-written by Bergh and cinematographer Jessica Charlton), which was part of the scheme's second cohort of applicants. The Commission played a role in bringing Mhairead Connor in as a producer as well as providing Berg and Charlton access to script development assistance from Graeme Tetley as part of their bootcamp experience.

The New Zealand Film Commission often works in conjunction with other government agencies, such as the Ministry for Culture and Heritage, the Ministry of Foreign Affairs and Trade, the Ministry for Tourism and the Ministry for Business, Innovation and Employment.

=== Film On Demand ===
In 2014 the New Zealand Film Commission launched a transactional video on demand service, NZ Film On Demand. The site features NZ films for rent and purchase, with a library of films that will grow over time. The underlying technology of the platform was developed by Hamilton, New Zealand based company Indiereign.

=== Records ===
The main classes of records held include:

- Applications for financial assistance for development, production, distribution and promotion of New Zealand films;
- Contracts in respect of investments made by the commission; and
- Contracts in respect of sales of a New Zealand film represented by the commission.

== Structure ==
The New Zealand Film Commission is governed by a seven-member board appointed by the Minister for Arts, Culture and Heritage. Members represent the film industry and the wider business and arts community. The Board meets every two months to set policy and budgets, monitor progress against targets and budgets and consider applications for feature film production financing.

Day-to-day activities are carried out by a staff of 46 from their Wellington office. The internal structure is based on four business units (Development and Production, Talent Development and Relationships, Marketing and Screen Incentives Administration) and three support groups (Business Affairs, Finance and Strategy and Research) all linked by strong connections across the organisation. Notable staff have included Mladen Ivančić, who was appointed as finance director in 1989 and retired in 2023 after serving as acting CEO on six occasions.

== Controversies ==
In 2019, the New Zealand Film Commission received public attention and criticism for its taxpayer-funded support of Wolf Warrior 2, a film described as Chinese propaganda.

In October 2024, the Film Commission attracted criticism from Minister for Arts, Culture and Heritage Paul Goldsmith and the New Zealand Taxpayers' Union after spending over NZ$145,354.81 to send four staff members to attend the Cannes Film Market in May 2024. The money was reportedly spent on accommodation, food and drink and travel. In response, the Film Commission defended the trip, arguing that operating costs were lower than in 2023. They also outlined that the NZFC attended the Cannes Film Market, the world’s largest international film industry gathering, at a total cost of $145,354.81. Expenses included accommodation in studio apartments, flights for four staff members, and hosting costs for over 270 guests across multiple networking events. The delegation participated in over 100 meetings, events, and appointments with industry leaders such as film commissioners, festival directors, producers, and financiers. These activities are considered part of the NZFC's efforts to support New Zealand’s presence in the global screen sector, which is projected to be worth $390 billion by 2028.
