= Fiona Samuel =

New Zealand writer, actor and director

Fiona Samuel MNZM
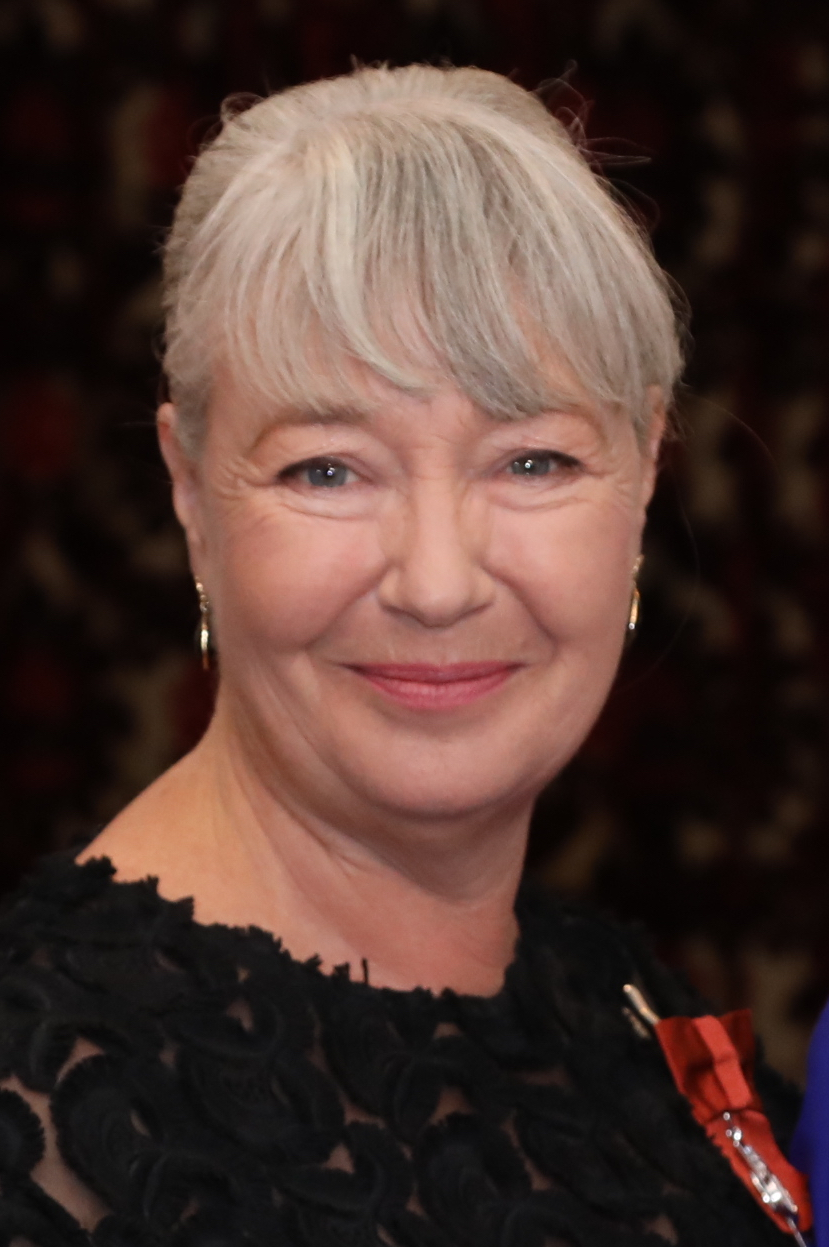
- Born: 1961 (age 64–65); Scotland
- Education: Toi Whakaari: New Zealand Drama School
- Occupation: Writer
- Writing career
- Notable awards: Arts Foundation of New Zealand Laureate (2012)

Fiona Samuel MNZM (born 1961) is a New Zealand writer, actor and director. Her career spans theatre, film, radio and television.

== Early life ==
Samuel was raised in Scotland from 1961 until the age of five. She moved to New Zealand and grew up in Christchurch before moving to Wellington to train as an actor at the New Zealand Drama School. She graduated from Toi Whakaari: New Zealand Drama School in 1980 with a Diploma in Acting.

== Selected works ==
=== Plays ===
- 2010 – Ghost Train
- 2004 – The Liar’s Bible
- 1996 – One Flesh
- 1993 – Lashings of Whipped Cream: A Session with a Teenage Dominatrix
- 1988 – The Wedding Party

=== Publications ===
- 2013 20 New Zealand Playwrights (interview), Playmarket
- 2011 Number 8 Wire; 8 Plays, 8 Decades, Playmarket
- 2011 One Flesh in No. 8 Wire: 8 Plays/8 Decades.
- 1995 Lashings of Whipped Cream: A Session with a Teenage Dominatrix
- 1989 Blonde Bombshell in Three Radio Plays.

== Filmography ==
=== Short films ===
- 2006 Writer and Director - The Garden of Love
- 2001 Written with Murray Keane - Falling Sparrows
- 1996 Writer and Director - Song of the Siren
- 1994 Writer - Bitch
- 1994 Written with Murray Keane - Prickle

== Television ==
- 2014 Writer – Consent – The Louise Nicholas Story
- 2013 Head writer and episode writer – Agent Anna Series 2
- 2011–2013 Story liner and episode writer over three series – Nothing Trivial
- 2011 Episode writer – The Almighty Johnsons
- 2010 Writer and Director – Bliss – The Beginning of Katherine Mansfield
- 2008 Writer and Director – Piece of My Heart
- 2006–2009 Episode writer over three series – Outrageous Fortune
- 2006 Writer and Director – Interrogation: Girl in Woods
- 2001–2004 Episode writer over three series – Mercy Peak
- 2001 Writer and Director – Virginity – A Documentary
- 1997 Writer and Director – Home Movie
- 1994 Writer and Director – A Real Dog
- 1994 Writer – Her New Life
- 1994 Writer – House Rules
- 1987 Creator and Writer – The Marching Girls
- 1986 Voiced Cheeky Hobson/Pongo – Footrot Flats a Dogs Tale

== Radio ==
- 1994 Don't Touch That Dial
- 1993 A Short History of Contraception
- 1991 Words of Love
- 1983 Blonde Bombshell

== Awards and honours ==
- 2019 – Member of the New Zealand Order of Merit, for services to television and theatre.
- 2015 – NEXT Woman of the Year, Arts & Culture category.
- 2014 – NZ Film and Television Awards, Best Television Drama – The Louise Nicholas Story
- 2014 – Script Writers Awards NZ (SWANZ), Best Telefeature Script – The Louise Nicolas Story
- 2012 – New Zealand Arts Foundation Arts Laureate
- 2012 – New Zealand Television Awards. Best Director – Bliss
- 2011 – New Zealand Writers Guild Award, Best Telefeature Script – Bliss
- 2010 – New Zealand Writers Guild Awards, Best Play -Ghost Train
- 2009 – New Zealand Screen Award, Best Actress and Best Supporting Actress - Piece of My Heart
- 2006 – New Zealand Film and Television Awards Best Script: Drama – Interrogation: Girl in Woods
- 2005 – Buddle Findlay Sargeson Fellowship
- 1999 – University of Auckland Literary Fellowship
- 1998 – New Zealand Film and Television Awards Best Drama – Home Movie
- 1996 – Bilbao Film Festival, Mikeldi de Ficcion D'oro, Best Short Film – Song of the Siren
- 1996 – Turin Film Festival, Audience Award – Song of the Siren
- 1994 – Mobil Awards, Best Radio Drama – A Short History of Contraception
- 1994 – Mobil Awards, Best Radio Drama – Don't Touch That Dial
- 1993 – National Radio's Women's Suffrage Centenary Playwriting Award – A Short History of Contraception
- 1984 – Mobil Awards, Best Radio Drama – Blond Bombshell
