= 2017 Australia Day Honours =

The 2017 Australia Day Honours were announced on 26 January 2017 by the Governor General of Australia, Sir Peter Cosgrove.

The Australia Day Honours are the first of the two major annual honours lists, announced on Australia Day (26 January), with the other being the Queen's Birthday Honours which are announced on the second Monday in June.

== Order of Australia ==
=== Companion of the Order of Australia (AC) ===
Order of Australia (Civil) ribbon

Order of Australia (Military) ribbon

==== General Division ====
Recipient	Citation	Notes
The Hon Anna Bligh	For eminent service to the Parliament of Queensland, particularly as Premier, to infrastructure development and education reform, as an advocate for the role of women in public life, and to the not-for-profit sector.	
Her Excellency the Hon Linda Dessau AM	For eminent service to the people of Victoria through leadership roles in the judiciary, to the advancement of economic ties and business relationships, and as a supporter of charitable, sporting and arts organisations.	
The Hon Bob Ellicott QC	For eminent service to the Parliament of Australia, particularly as Attorney-General, to legal practice and innovative policy development, to advancements in global trade law, and to the international arbitration of sporting disputes.	
The Hon Justice Stephen Gageler	For eminent service to the law and to the judiciary through contributions in the areas of constitutional, public, international, common and criminal law, to legal reform, education and academic discourse, and to professional organisations.	
The Hon Julia Gillard	For eminent service to the Parliament of Australia, particularly as Prime Minister, through seminal contributions to economic and social development, particularly policy reform in the areas of education, disability care, workplace relations, health, foreign affairs and the environment, and as a role model to women.	
Prof Andrew Holmes AM	For eminent service to science through developments in the field of organic and polymer chemistry as a researcher, editor and academic, and through the governance of nationally recognised, leading scientific organisations.	
The Hon Dr David Kemp	For eminent service to the Parliament of Australia, notably in the areas of employment, education, training and youth affairs, to the environment, to institutional reform and public policy development, and to the community.	
Dr Martin Parkinson PSM	For eminent service to the Australian community through leadership in public sector roles, to innovative government administration and high level program delivery, to the development of economic policy, and to climate change strategy.	
Dr Michael Spence	For eminent service to leadership of the tertiary education sector, to the advancement of equitable access to educational opportunities, to developing strategic programs focused on multidisciplinary research, and to the Anglican Church of Australia.	
Her Excellency Prof the Hon Catherine Warner AM	For eminent service to the people of Tasmania through leading contributions to the legal community, particularly to law reform, to higher education as an academic, researcher and publisher, and as a supporter of the arts, and environmental and social justice initiatives.	
Prof Keryn Williams	For eminent service to medical science in the field of ophthalmology through the research and development of corneal transplantation, as an academic and mentor, and as a supporter of young women scientists.	

=== Officer of the Order of Australia (AO) ===
==== General Division ====
Recipient	Citation	Notes
Dr Fred Norman Affleck	For distinguished service to the transport and logistics industries through leadership roles, to policy development and planning, and as a supporter of the performing arts.	
Jimmy Barnes	For distinguished service to the performing arts as a musician, singer and songwriter, and through support for not-for-profit organisations, particularly to children with a disability.	
Em Prof MaryAnn Bin-Sallik	For distinguished service to tertiary education as an academic, author and administrator, particularly in the area of Indigenous studies and culture, and as a role model and mentor.	
Dr Graeme Leslie Blackman OAM	For distinguished service to the pharmaceutical industry, to scientific research and policy development, to theological education and the Anglican Church of Australia, and to aged care.	
Massimo Borghetti	For distinguished service to the Australian aviation industry, to the development of national and international tourism opportunities, and as a supporter of the arts and sport.	
Robert Reginald Bowen	For distinguished service to community health in Queensland, particularly through not-for-profit research organisations, to medical biotechnology manufacturing and export, and to fostering innovation.	
William Donald Bowness	For distinguished service to the visual and performing arts through philanthropic contributions, fundraising and advisory roles, and to the building and construction industry.	
Roberta Anne Brazil	For distinguished service to tertiary education governance, to agricultural, environmental and resource management organisations, and to women in rural and regional areas.	
The Hon John Brumby	For distinguished service to the Parliament of Victoria, to economic management and medical biotechnology innovation, to improved rural and regional infrastructure, and to the community.	
Nick Cave	For distinguished service to the performing arts as a musician, songwriter, author and actor, both nationally and internationally, and as a major contributor to Australian music culture and heritage.	
The Hon Stephen Charles	For distinguished service to the law and to the judiciary, particularly in the areas of commercial arbitration and mediation, to judicial administration, and to legal professional organisations.	
Tina Anne Coco	For distinguished service to community health as a leader of, and advocate for, organ and tissue donation and transplantation coordination organisations at the state, national and international level.	
Prof Stephen Colagiuri	For distinguished service to medical research in the field of diabetes and endocrinology as an academic, clinician and author, to global health policy formation, and to professional bodies.	
Lyndsay Genevieve Connors AM	For distinguished service to national public education policy, to improved school performance and equitable funding delivery, and as a role model and mentor of young women.	
Dr Gregory Arthur Constable	For distinguished service to agricultural science as an agronomist and plant breeder, particularly to cotton management and production, and to professional national and international scientific organisations.	
Prof David Jamie Cooper	For distinguished service to intensive care medicine in the field of traumatic brain injury as a clinician and to medical education as an academic, researcher and author.	
Prof Mark Emmanuel Cooper	For distinguished service to biomedical research in the field of diabetes and related renal and cardiovascular diseases, to medical education, and as a mentor of young scientists.	
Prof Gregory Joseph Craven	For distinguished service to tertiary education through leadership and representational roles with a range of institutions, to the Catholic Church in Australia, and to constitutional law.	
Prof Jane den Hollander	For distinguished service to tertiary education through a range of executive administration and advisory roles, as a supporter of professional educational organisations, and to the community.	
Dr Helen Durham	For distinguished service to international relations in the area of humanitarian and criminal law, to the protection of women during times of armed conflict, and to legal education.	
Helen Norma Evans	For distinguished service to global health as an advocate for the improved treatment of infectious diseases in underprivileged populations, particularly for women and children.	
Ahmed Fahour	For distinguished service to business, particularly in the area of postal communications, to the banking and investment sectors, and as a supporter of improved multicultural relations.	
Mick Fanning	For distinguished service to surfing as a professional competitor at the national and international level, and as a supporter of a range of charitable foundations.	
Prof Leon Flicker	For distinguished service to medicine and medical education in the field of geriatrics, as an academic and researcher, and through contributions to improved dementia prevention and care.	
Andrew Forrest	For distinguished service to the mining sector, to the development of employment and business opportunities, as a supporter of sustainable foreign investment, and to philanthropy.	
Prof Raymond Leslie Frost	For distinguished service to science, and to higher education, as an academic, researcher and author, particularly in the field of vibrational spectroscopy, and as a mentor of young scientists.	
Prof James Gehling	For distinguished service to environmental science, and to higher education, as an academic and researcher, in the area of palaeontology, and to the community of the Flinders Ranges.	
Em Prof William Peter Gibson AM	For distinguished service to medicine, particularly in the area of otolaryngology, as a clinician, to the advancement of cochlear implant programs, and to professional medical organisations.	
Prof Gwendolyn Lesley Gilbert	For distinguished service to medical research, particularly the study of infectious disease prevention and control, to tertiary education as an academic, and to public health policy.	
Prof Peter Philip Gray	For distinguished service to science in the field of bio-engineering and nanotechnology as an academic and researcher, and to professional biotechnology associations.	
Prof Patricia Grimshaw	For distinguished service to the social sciences and to the humanities through researching, documenting and preserving Australian history, and the roles of women in society.	
His Honour the Hon John Hardy OAM	For distinguished service to the people of the Northern Territory, and as a patron and supporter of a range of aviation, health, emergency service and charitable organisations.	
Mary Patricia Hemming	For distinguished service to community health as a leader and consultant in the development of therapeutic and pharmaceutical guidelines, nationally and internationally	
Em Prof Tracey Ann Horton	For distinguished service to business and business education through a range of leadership and academic roles, and to the arts in Western Australia.	
Prof Ian William Johnston	For distinguished service to engineering, as an academic, researcher, practitioner and consultant, particularly in the fields of structural foundation engineering and geothermal energy.	
Paul Kelly	For distinguished service to the performing arts and to the promotion of the national identity through contributions as a singer, songwriter and musician.	
Adjunct Prof Lizbeth Moira Kenny	For distinguished service to medicine as a clinician and researcher in the field of radiation oncology, and to executive roles with professional organisations nationally and internationally.	
John David Laidlaw OAM	For distinguished service to the community through philanthropic endeavours with a range of health, social welfare and disability support organisations.	
Terence Henry Lawler	For distinguished service to the community of the Hunter, particularly through advocacy for disability support organisations, to medical research, and to business.	
Ken Lay APM	For distinguished service to law enforcement as Chief Commissioner of the Victoria Police, through structural reforms to recruitment, training and deployment, and to social and community leadership.	
Gary John Liddle	For distinguished service to public administration in the Victorian transport sector through leadership in policy direction, infrastructure development, road safety and regulatory reform.	
Dr Carol Ann Liston	For distinguished service to the preservation and documentation of Australian history and heritage, to professional societies, and to education as a teacher and mentor.	
Em Prof William John Lovegrove	For distinguished service to leadership in the tertiary education sector, to developing academia in regional areas, and to cooperative research in a variety of fields.	
Max Lu	For distinguished service to education, to national and international research in the fields of materials chemistry and nanotechnology, to engineering, and to Australia–China relations.	
Bernard Vincent McKay	For distinguished service to public administration, particularly to the health sector, through the development, promotion and implementation of preventative health campaigns, programs and policies.	
David McKee	For distinguished service to the community through philanthropic, administrative and voluntary service with social welfare and arts organisations in South Australia.	
Em Prof John Griffiths McLean	For distinguished service to science as a veterinarian, toxicologist and academic, to engineering education, and to the regulation of agricultural chemicals and veterinary drugs.	
The Reverend Alistair Macrae	For distinguished service to the Uniting Church in Australia through executive and ministerial roles at state and national levels, and to the promotion of ecumenism, interfaith dialogue and reconciliation.	
Prof Colin Louis Masters	For distinguished service to medical research through international and national contributions to understanding Alzheimer's and other neurodegenerative diseases.	
Dr Alain Guy Middleton	For distinguished service to dentistry as a forensic odontologist, as a global expert in victim identification, and through the development of international standards in disaster response.	
Em Prof William Richard Mulford	For distinguished service to academic administration and management, as a researcher into educational leadership and school effectiveness, and through executive roles with professional associations.	
Anne O'Donovan	For distinguished service to literature through the Australian publishing industry, as a mentor to authors, editors and publishers, and through sustained support for homeless youth.	
Rebecca Peters	For distinguished service to the community as an advocate and campaigner for gun control, and as a global leader in the reduction of the proliferation and misuse of small arms.	
Dr William David Proudman	For distinguished service to medicine as a physician and specialist in renal transplant surgery, and to the profession as a clinician, mentor, researcher and innovator.	
Guy Alan Reynolds AM	For distinguished service to the community through leadership of a range of programs designed to support youth in sporting, educational and employment pursuits.	
Dr Christopher Graham Roberts	For distinguished service to science and the development and commercialisation of medical biotechnology, particularly through the cochlear implant program, and the management of respiratory conditions.	
Ian Frederick Rodwell	For distinguished service to community health as a supporter and advocate for funding to promote research and awareness of motor neuron disease in Australia.	
Khalil Shahin	For distinguished service to business and commerce, to philanthropy as an advocate for corporate social responsibility, and to the multicultural community.	
Em Prof Larry Sitsky AM	For distinguished service to the arts as a composer and concert pianist, to music education as a researcher and mentor, and through musical contributions to Australia's contemporary culture.	
Dr John Graeme Sloman AM, ED	For distinguished service to medicine, particularly to the specialty of cardiology, as a clinician, through advisory roles with a range of medical organisations, and to the community.	
Prof Andrew Justin Stewart Coats	For distinguished service to medical research and tertiary education in the field of cardiology, as an academic and author, and as a mentor and role model for young scientists.	
Alastair Hall Swayn	For distinguished service to architecture in the Australian Capital Territory, through executive roles with professional architectural institutes, and to the community	
David Thodey	For distinguished service to business, notably to the telecommunications and information technology sectors, to the promotion of ethical leadership and workplace diversity, and to basketball.	
Prof David Laurence Vaux	For distinguished service to medicine in the field of biomedical cancer research, to higher education as an academic and mentor, and to professional integrity and ethics.	
Isaac Wakil	For distinguished service to the community through a range of philanthropic endeavours, and as a supporter of charitable, education and cultural organisations.	
Susan Wakil	For distinguished service to the community through a range of philanthropic endeavours, and as a supporter of charitable, education and cultural organisations.	
Prof Gordon George Wallace	For distinguished service to science and research in polymer materials and their use in biomedical applications, and to national and international collaboration with industry.	
Brian Francis Watson	For distinguished service to business and finance through leadership roles in the investment and venture capital sectors, as a philanthropist, and as a supporter of social welfare and medical research organisations.	
Mark Webber	For distinguished service to motor sport as a competitor and ambassador, and to the community through fundraising and patronage of a range of medical and youth support organisations.	
The Hon Justice Mark Weinberg	For distinguished service to the judiciary and to the law, particularly through reforms to criminal law and procedure, to legal education in Victoria, and to the administration of justice in Fiji and Norfolk Island.	
His Excellency Peter Woolcott	For distinguished service to public administration in the field of international relations through senior diplomatic roles, and as a lead negotiator in the non-proliferation and arms control fields.	
The Hon Christopher Reginald Wright QC	For distinguished service to the judiciary and the Supreme Court of Tasmania, to the law as Solicitor-General, and through senior roles with tribunal and review boards at both state and Federal level.	

==== Military Division ====
Recipient	Citation	Notes
RADM Stuart Mayer CSC & Bar, RAN	For distinguished service to the Royal Australian Navy principally in key command roles.	

=== Member of the Order of Australia (AM) ===
==== General Division ====
Recipient	Citation	Notes
Dr Noel Ami Alpins	For significant service to ophthalmology, particularly to the development of innovative refractive surgery techniques, and to professional associations.	
Prof. Jon Charles Altman	For significant service to tertiary education as a researcher and administrator, and to the social sciences and Indigenous economic policy.	
Prof. Patricia Armati	For significant service to medical research in the field of neuroscience, to tertiary education, and to the community.	
Luciana Arrighi	For significant service to the performing arts, particularly to film, theatre and opera, as a costume and production designer.	
Denis Baguley	For significant service to public administration in Victoria through infrastructure project management, and to veterans and their families.	
Prof. Ian Bailey SC	For significant service to the law, particularly in the area of dispute resolution in the construction industry, and to education.	
Kevin Bailey	For significant service to Australia-Timor Leste relations, to philanthropic organisations, to the financial planning sector, and to the community.	
David Barragallo	For significant service to the information technology industry, to higher education, to business, and to people with disabilities.	
Nola Barkl	For significant service to the community, particularly through executive and voluntary roles with a range of women's organisations.	
Gary Barnes	For significant service to public administration in the areas of industry development, major projects, education and human resource programs.	
Alexander Baykitch	For significant service to the law in the field of international commercial arbitration, and to professional legal organisations.	
Dr Vaughan Beck	For significant service to engineering, to tertiary education administration and research, and to professional academies.	
The Hon. Justice Kevin Bell	For significant service to the law and to the judiciary, to native title and human rights, and to the community.	
Margaret Birtley	For significant service to cultural heritage, particularly to the museums sector, to education, and to historical preservation.	
Gillian Biscoe	For significant service to the community through leadership and advisory roles with state, national and international public health organisations.	
Prof. Alan Bittles	For significant service to medical education in the field of genomics, as an academic and researcher, and to professional groups.	
Prof. Jillian Blackmore	For significant service to education as an academic and administrator, to social justice and equity, and to policy reform.	
Susan Blundell	For significant service to education, particularly to the teaching of languages, and to professional learning and tourism bodies.	
Tony Bonner	For significant service to the performing arts as an actor, to surf lifesaving, and to the community through charitable organisations.	
Emeritus Prof. John Bowie	For significant service to science in the field of mass spectrometry, and to education as an academic, researcher and author.	
Prof. John Boyages	For significant service to medicine in the specialty of radiation oncology as a clinician, to medical education, to professional organisations and to people with breast cancer.	
Clinical Assoc. Prof. Stephen Bradshaw	For significant service to medicine as a vascular surgeon, to health practitioner regulation, and to medical education.	
Kim Brennan	For significant service to rowing, to the welfare of elite athletes, to sport as a gold medallist at the Rio 2016 Olympic Games, and to the community.	
Dr Garry Brian	For significant service to ophthalmology, and to the provision of eye health care programs in rural and remote communities.	
David Christopher Brill	For significant service to the broadcast media as a cinematographer and journalist, and to the community of Tasmania.	
Bernard Brookes	For significant service to the retailing sector through leadership roles, to national and international business associations, and to the community.	
Prof. Judith Brown	For significant service to music education as an academic and teacher, to professional organisations, and to the community.	
John Burdett	For significant service to community health through executive roles with medical research institutes, and to the finance sector.	
Dr Noel Burley	For significant service to the community through social welfare initiatives, to engineering, and to scientific research and development.	
Kevin Caroll	For significant service to business as an advocate for Australian manufacturers, and through government and private sector linkages.	
Brian Castles-Onion	For significant service to the performing arts, particularly to opera, as a conductor, musician and repetiteur.	
Dr Robin Chase	For significant service to occupational and environmental medicine, to professional medical organisations, and to education.	
Steven Chopping	For significant service to motor sports through leadership and technical advisory roles, and to national and international professional groups.	
Dr Roberta Chow	For significant service to medicine as a clinician, and to pioneering developments in the use of laser therapy techniques for chronic pain management.	
Emeritus Prof. Sandford Clark	For significant service to the law, to the development of water management and legislation, and to legal education.	
Prof. Simon Clarke	For significant service to medicine as a clinical academic and researcher, particularly in the area of adolescent health.	
Assoc. Prof. Ruth Colagiuru	For significant service to medicine in the field of diabetes, as an academic and researcher, and to health policy development.	
Dr Peter Cooke OAM	For significant service to the performing arts, and to education, as an academic and administrator, particularly to theatre and dance.	
Melanie Cooper	For significant service to the community through philanthropic support for, and leadership roles with, charitable foundations, and to business.	
John Corcoran	For significant service to the law, and to the legal profession, through a range of executive roles, and to the community.	
Noel Cornish	For significant service to business as an advocate for industry policy and development, to tertiary education administration, and to the community.	
Rosemary Craddock	For significant service to local government in South Australia, and to the community of Walkerville.	
John Craik	For significant service to the community through Christian fellowship groups, to youth, and to the life insurance sector.	
The late Dr Patrick Cregan	For significant service to medicine and health care delivery in New South Wales, and to clinical advisory and governance roles.	
Peter Crossing	For significant service to the community through philanthropic support for, and leadership positions with, major cultural institutions, and to business.	
Denele Crozier	For significant service to the community, particularly to women's health, and to social welfare and legal assistance organisations.	
The Hon. Elizabeth Curtain	For significant service to the law, and to the judiciary, in Victoria, to medico-legal and professional groups, and to the community.	
John Dainton	For significant service to conservation and the environment through natural resource management, and to the dairy industry.	
Geraldine Daley	For significant service to the legal profession, and to the law, in New South Wales through a range of organisations, and to the community.	
His Grace the Most Rev. Archbishop Issam Darwish	For significant service to the Melkite Greek Catholic Church in Australia, to the promotion of inter-faith relations, and to the community.	
Janette Davie	For significant service to the tourism sector through executive and advisory roles with travel industry associations, and to the community.	
Emeritus Prof. Christine Deer	For significant service to education as an academic and author, to professional learning associations, and to the community.	
John Dickenson OAM	For significant service to sports aviation as a pioneer of innovative design and development of hang-gliding and para-gliding equipment.	
Claire Dobbin	For significant service to the motion picture industry, particularly to national and international film festivals, through education, and to screenwriting.	
Alison Doley	For significant service to conservation and the environment in Western Australia through revegetation and catchment recovery initiatives.	
Dr Hugh Dove	For significant service to agricultural science as a researcher and editor, and to the study of animal nutrition.	
Dr Susan Downes	For significant service to rural and remote medicine in Western Australia as a general practitioner, and to Indigenous health.	
Dr Iain Dunlop	For significant service to ophthalmology, particularly through executive roles with professional medical organisations, and as a practitioner.	
John Edwards	For significant service to the broadcast media industry as a television producer, and as a role model and mentor.	
Assoc. Prof. William Emmerson	For significant service to medicine, particularly to psychiatry, to medical administration, and through contributions to mental health groups.	
Robin Fardoulys	For significant service to the building and construction industry, to standards and policy development, and to tertiary education.	
Robin Fildes OAM	For significant service to athletics, particularly through executive roles with leading administrative bodies, to business, and to the community.	
Melinda Gainsford-Taylor	For significant service to athletics as a sprinter, at the national and international level, and as a role model for young athletes.	
Peter Garrison SC	For significant service to the law, to the legal profession, and to public administration, in the Australian Capital Territory.	
Joanna Gash	For significant service to the Parliament of Australia, to local government, and to the community of the Shoalhaven.	
Prof. Fadia Ghossayn	For significant service to Australia-Lebanon relations through academic collaboration, cultural and student exchange programs, and to the community.	
Philip Glendenning	For significant service to the community through social welfare organisations, as an advocate for human rights, and to education.	
Russell Hammond	For significant service to the performing arts, particularly to music, as a conductor and administrator, and to professional associations.	
Dr Philip Harding	For significant service to medicine as an endocrinologist, to medical ethics and standards, and to the community.	
Prof. Richard Harvey	For significant service to medicine in the field of cell biology and cardiovascular research, and through scientific leadership roles.	
Dr Donald Hector	For significant service to science in the field of chemical engineering, and to business.	
His Honour Judge Graham Henson	For significant service to the law and to the judiciary, to public administration, to legal standards, and to education.	
Clinical Prof. Harry Iland	For significant service to medicine, and to medical research, in the specialty of haematology, and as a mentor of young scientists.	
Michellie Jones	For significant service to athletes who are blind or have low vision, as a gold medallist at the Rio 2016 Paralympic Games, and to sport as a triathlete.	
Dr Thomas Karmel	For significant service to vocational education research and administration, and to the community through public administration roles.	
Phil Kearns	For significant service to the community through support for charitable organisations, to business, and to rugby union at the elite level.	
Judith Kennedy	For significant service to the winemaking industry, particularly through contributions to promotional events, and to children's health foundations.	
Robert Kennedy	For significant service to the Indigenous community of Central Australia, to economic development and tourism promotion, and to local government.	
Prof. Makhan Singh Khangure	For significant service to medicine in the field of neuroradiology, to education, and to a range of professional medical associations.	
Alan Kinkade	For significant service to medical administration at the state and national level, particularly through financial management and executive roles.	
Ian Klug	For significant service to the business sector, to economic development in Queensland, to accountancy, and to the community.	
Steven Knott	For significant service to the resources and energy industries, to the advancement of women, and to industrial relations.	
Prof. Vijay Kumar	For significant service to medical research in the disciplines of nuclear medicine and biology, to professional organisations, and to the community.	
Prof. Albert Hoi King Lam	For significant service to medicine, particularly of paediatric radiology, as a clinician, and to child health education.	
Judith Lazarus	For significant service to the community through social welfare groups, notably through custodial rehabilitation and resettlement initiatives.	
Patricia Lees	For significant service to the Indigenous community of Mount Isa, and to youth, aged care, legal and health organisations.	
Robert Legge	For significant service to the community through roles at the state, national and international level with the Red Cross	
Bruce Linn	For significant service to the community, notably in the areas of social welfare, education administration, and information technology, and to local government.	
Mark Longworth	For significant service to community health through the development of programs to assist people affected by stroke.	
Conjoint Associate Prof. Sandra Lowe	For significant service to obstetric medicine as a clinician, to medical education, and to professional organisations.	
Ross Peter McCann	For significant service to the environment, to the promotion of sustainable resource use, to chemical engineering, and to the community.	
Robert McEwen	For significant service to cycling at the national and international level as a competitor, coach, and advisor, and to the community.	
Allan Raymond McGill	For significant service to local government in the Northern Territory, to sport, and to the community.	
John Michael McInerney	For significant service to town planning, and to architecture, to professional organisations, to local government, and to the community.	
Norman Leslie McKenzie	For significant service to science, and to the environment, particularly to biological surveys, to conservation and planning, and as an author.	
Cynthia McMorran OAM	For significant service to the community of Western Australia, to regional development and natural resource management, and to aged care.	
The late Christopher Roy McPherson	For significant service to the print media industry in rural and regional areas, to men's health, and to the community.	
The Hon. Justin Mark Madden	For significant service to the Parliament of Victoria, to Australian rules football as a player, and to the community.	
The Hon. Kevin John Mahony	For significant service to the law and to the judiciary in Victoria, to education, and to professional legal bodies.	
Prof. Lynette Margaret March	For significant service to medicine in the areas of rheumatology and clinical epidemiology, as an academic, researcher and clinician.	
Graeme John Martin	For significant service to the real estate industry through executive roles, to professional property institutes, and to education.	
Mitchel Simon Martin-Weber	For significant service to the not-for-profit sector through philanthropic support for a range of organisations, and to business and training.	
Bruce Roger Maslin	For significant service to botany, particularly in Western Australia, as a research scientist, and as an author.	
Emeritus Prof. William Chisholm Maxwell	For significant service to veterinary science in the field of animal reproductive biology through academic and advisory roles.	
Donald Leslie Moffatt	For significant service to the community of the Sunshine Coast, to aero-medical organisations, and to the horse racing industry.	
Michael John Moore	For significant service to community health, particularly to social policy reform, and to the community of the Australian Capital Territory.	
Adjunct Prof. Robert William Morris-Nunn	For significant service to commercial architecture in Tasmania, to tertiary education, to professional institutes, and as a role model.	
Kingsley Alwyn Mundey	For significant service to the community as a supporter of a range of veterans', Indigenous skills development, and cultural organisations.	
Adjunct Prof. the Hon. Nahum Mushin	For significant service to the judiciary, particularly to family law, to legal education, and to the welfare of children.	
Nicolette Dene Norris	For significant service to the community, particularly to the rights, protection and welfare of children.	
Andrew Patrick O'Keefe	For significant service to the broadcast media as a television presenter, and to social welfare and charitable organisations.	
Assoc. Prof. Geoffrey Thomas Painter	For significant service to medicine in the field of ophthalmology, and to international relations, particularly to eye health in Asia and the Pacific.	
The late Dr Peter Wren Parodi	For significant service to science as a biochemist, and to the dairy industry through contributions to studies in human nutrition.	
Allan Pidgeon	For significant service to the community through a range of roles, particularly to the promotion of the Australian national flag.	
The late Sebastiano Pitruzzello OAM	For significant service to the Italian community of Victoria, and to business and commerce.	
Peter Sean Price OAM	For significant service to community safety as an advocate for law enforcement and crime prevention programs.	
Christopher Robert Pye	For significant service to the tourism and hospitality industry in Western Australia through leadership roles, and to the community.	
Dr John Michael Quinn	For significant service to medicine in the fields of general and vascular surgery, and to professional organisations.	
Jan Richards	For significant service to library and information management through executive roles with professional associations.	
The Hon. Eric Stephen Ripper	For significant service to the people and Parliament of Western Australia, particularly through budgetary reform, native title policy, and energy sector developments.	
John Michael Rock	For significant service to national and international health through advocacy roles for people with HIV/AIDS.	
Campbell Alan Rose	For significant service to sports administration, to infrastructure and transport development, and to the community of Victoria.	
Bernard Joseph Salt	For significant service to the community as a demographer, and through research and commentary on social and cultural change.	
Adjunct Assoc. Prof. Alan Stephen Sandford	For significant service to medical administration and health management through a range of executive roles.	
Simon Andrew Schrapel	For significant service to the community, particularly to children and families through social welfare organisations, programs and initiatives.	
Prof. Andrew Mark Scott	For significant service to nuclear medicine and cancer research as an academic, and to professional organisations.	
Prof. Christopher Semsarian	For significant service to medicine in the field of cardiology as a clinician, administrator and educator, and to the community.	
Leon Serry	For significant service to the biotechnology industry, to the development and commercialisation of biomedical science, and as a mentor.	
James Glen Service	For significant service to the community through contributions to charitable organisations, and to the property, construction, and tourism sectors.	
Karen Ann Sheldon	For significant service to the community through the development of Indigenous employment and training opportunities, and to the hospitality industry.	
The Very Rev. Dr John Harley Shepherd	For significant service to the Anglican Church of Australia through senior liturgical roles, and to the community.	
Prof. Evan Rutherford Simpson	For significant service to medical science, particularly in the field of breast cancer, as an academic and researcher.	
The late Dr Owen Bruce Slee	For significant service to science, particularly in the field of radio astronomy, as a researcher, author and mentor of young scientists.	
The late Emeritus Prof. Larry Robert Smith	For significant service to the vocational education and training sector, through leadership and research roles, and to professional organisations.	
Constance Lynne Spencer	For significant service to conservation and the environment through research into the native plants of Central Australia.	
David Ian Stanton	For distinguished service to public administration, to social policy development, and as an academic.	
The Hon. Julian Ferdinand Stefani OAM	For significant service to the community through charitable and multicultural organisations, and to the Parliament of South Australia.	
Rosemary Anne Stern	For significant service to hockey as a tournament director, administrator and official.	
Prof. Robert John Stimson	For significant service to science as a researcher and academic, particularly in the discipline of analytical human geography.	
Robert Kirk Strike	For significant service to the community through advocacy and support roles for people with special needs.	
Aija Gundega Thomas	For significant service to architecture, particularly in the area of health facility planning and design.	
Christopher West Thomas	For significant service to business and commerce, and to the community through support for a range of arts and medical research organisations.	
Christopher Ian Thorn	For significant service to the not-for-profit sector through advisory roles on philanthropic strategic planning, and to the community.	
Prof. Catherine Therese Turner	For significant service to nursing through research into nurse practice and population health, and to professional organisations.	
Philip Johnson Twyman	For significant service to the insurance industry, as a mentor and role model in business, and to international relations.	
Dr Peter Joseph Verco	For significant service to paediatric dentistry through mentoring and advocacy roles, as a clinician, and to professional organisations.	
The late Terry Tabuai Waia	For significant service to Indigenous and Torres Strait Island communities in Far North Queensland through leadership, advisory and advocacy roles.	
Maureen Walker	For significant service to equestrian sports, and to the horse industry as a rider, breeder, trainer and instructor.	
Dr Sue-Anne Wallace	For significant service to the not-for-profit sector, particularly through charitable fundraising reform and establishing codes of practice.	
Prof. Malcolm Ross Walter	For significant service to science in the field of astrobiology as an author, academic, educator and mentor.	
Brian Emlyn Walters QC	For significant service to conservation through environmental protection law, and to human rights advocacy in Victoria.	
Anthony Thorne Warlow	For significant service to the performing arts through contributions to opera and musical theatre as a singer, actor and entertainer.	
Paul Laurence Wheelton OAM	For significant service to a range of charitable organisations in Victoria through governance, fundraising and philanthropic contributions.	
Jennifer June Williams	For significant service to the community through leadership roles in the public health sector, and to NGO governance.	
John Dennis Williams	For significant service to Indigenous rights through health and social welfare organisations, and as an advocate for reconciliation.	
Dr Lynne Susanna Williams	For significant service to public sector administration, and to economic and public policy reform in Victoria.	
Albert Yueling Wong	For significant service to the community, particularly to medical research organisations, to the tertiary education sector, and to the visual arts.	
Dr Andrew John Wright	For significant service to international relations and to the health and wellbeing of the Acholi people of Northern Uganda.	
Annette Vicki Wright	For significant service to international relations and to the health and wellbeing of the Acholi people of Northern Uganda.	
Prof. John Yeaman	For significant service to civil engineering and road asset maintenance management, to professional organisations, and to the community.	
Barbara May Yeoh	For significant service to public administration and to business, to community health care, and to transport organisations.	
Prof. Peter Samuel Zablud RFD	For significant service to the law, and to legal standards and education, particularly in the field of notarial studies.	

==== Military Division ====
Branch	Recipient	Citation	Notes
Navy	CDRE John William Chandler CSC, CSM, RAN	For exceptional performance of duty in the field of submarine and major combatant systems acquisition and sustainment.	
Army	BRIG Stephen James Beaumont	For exceptional service in the advancement of Defence international relations and the continued development of Defence intelligence capabilities.	
Army	BRIG Mark James Holmes MVO	For exceptional service in implementing approaches to modernisation in Army and the management of Defence contributions to institutional reform.	
Army	BRIG Rupert John Hoskins	For exceptional service to the representation of the Australian Defence Force and engagement with international partners.	
Army	COL Andrew David Lowe	For exceptional service in the delivery of small arms training and developing innovative approaches to training.	
Army	COL S	For exceptional service in the development of Army special operations capabilities.	
Army	COL Simon John Tuckerman CSC	For exceptional service in command positions delivering key capability and operational support to the Australian Defence Force.	
Air Force	Warrant Officer Brian William Bowman	For exceptional service to the Royal Australian Air Force in the fields of leadership; technical maintenance; and training development, management and delivery.	
Air Force	AIRCDRE Adam Rayce Brown CSC	For exceptional service in major organisational reform, aerospace acquisition and sustainment.	
Air Force	AIRCDRE Anthony Marc Forestier OAM	For exceptional service in air power education, capability development, and military strategy.	
Air Force	AIRCDRE Geoffrey Harland OAM	For exceptional service in personnel administration and air combat capability preparedness.	
Air Force	GCAPT Craig John Meighan	For exceptional service in the fields of Military Aviation and Joint Operations.	
Air Force	AIRCDRE Scott Jeffrey Winchester	For exceptional service in organisational reform, strategic infrastructure planning, and command.	

=== Medal of the Order of Australia (OAM) ===
==== General Division ====
Recipient	Citation	Notes
Joyce Frances Mary Abblitt	For service to community health.	
Bruce McIntyre Adams	For service to the community of Manildra.	
Gloria June Adams	For service to the community of Manildra.	
Roger John Adams	For service to the community through a range of fundraising activities.	
Gayle Alessio	For service to education.	
Elizabeth Joan Allen	For service to community health.	
Raymond Arthur Allsopp	For service to sport, particularly for school children.	
Major Keith Andrew Anderson (Retired)	For service to veterans and their families.	
Robert Timothy Anderson	For service to the real estate industry, and to the community.	
Graeme Alexander Andrews	For service to the community of Armidale.	
Marlene Ann Antico	For service to the visual arts, and to the community of Woollahra.	
Jennifer Claire Aramini	For service to youth, particularly through charitable organisations.	
Elaine Francis Armstrong	For service to the community through the Country Women's Association.	
Dr Michael Edward Armstrong	For service to medicine, and to the community.	
Professor Neal Mark Ashkanasy	For service to tertiary education, to psychology, and to the community.	
Robert Henry Askew	For service to local government, and to the community of Warrnambool.	
Stephen Edward Balmforth	For service to the environment.	
Norman Patrick Banner	For service to aged care.	
Dr Cameron James Bardsley	For service to medicine in Queensland.	
Commander Kenneth Malcolm Barnett RAN, (Retired)	For service to veterans and their families.	
Richard John Bartholomaeus	For service to the Lutheran Church of Australia, and to aged care.	
Jillian Kay Bartlett	For service to the performing arts in South Australia.	
Walter Charles Beale	For service to veterans and their families.	
Catherine Louise Beaufort	For service to radiotherapy, to international relations, and to sailing.	
Marilyn Kay Beaumont	For service to the community, particularly to women's health.	
Nicole Elise Beck	For service to sport as a gold medallist at the Rio 2016 Olympic Games.	
Dale Nygel Begg-Smith	For service to sport as a Winter Olympic Games Gold Medallist.	
Geoffrey Vernon Beilby	For service to conservation and the environment.	
Elisabeth Gay Bennett	For service to the community of Spring Bay.	
James Simeon Bennett	For service to people who are blind or with low vision.	
John Charles Bennett	For service to agricultural and show societies.	
John Francis Beresford	For service to the community through a range of organisations.	
Captain Donald Beresford Bergman RFD, ED, (Retired)	For service to veterans and their families, and to the community.	
Bryan John Besly	For service to engineering, and to the visual arts.	
The late Richard Biele	For service to youth, and to veterans and their families.	
Russel Damien Boaden	For service to sport as a gold medallist at the Rio 2016 Paralympic Games.	
Dr Sally Fiona Bonar	For service to medicine, particularly to orthopaedic pathology.	
Jessica Ackland Bond	For service to medical research through fundraising roles.	
Stewart Hampton Bonett	For service to veterans and their families.	
The late Alfred Joseph Borg	For service to local government, and to the community of Campbelltown.	
Elizabeth Anne Bowell	For service to nursing, and to international natural disaster health care assistance.	
Branislav William "Branco" Bratich	For service to karate.	
Robin Lynette Bromley	For service to the community, particularly to nutrition in schools.	
Edward "Anthony" Brown	For service to youth through rugby league.	
Rosemary Florence Brown	For service to international relations through voluntary education roles.	
William Hedley "Bill" Bunbury	For service to the broadcast media, and to the Indigenous community of Western Australia.	
William Morros Bundy	For service to the community of Cowra.	
Thomas Michael Burton	For service to sport as a gold medallist at the Rio Olympic Games 2016.	
Dr Fiona Lee Bush	For service to community history and heritage preservation.	
Bronte Lynn Campbell	For service to sport as a gold medallist at the Rio 2016 Olympic Games.	
Stephanie Janet Camplin	For service to the broadcast media, and to the community of Bathurst.	
Alexander John Carmody	For service to youth, and to medical and emergency service organisations.	
Charlotte Emily Caslick	For service to sport as a gold medallist at the Rio 2016 Olympic Games.	
Thelma Castles	For service to the community through charitable organisations.	
Kyle Brett Chalmers	For service to sport as a gold medallist at the Rio 2016 Olympic Games.	
The late Donald Brian Chambers	For service to local government, and to the community of Victoria.	
Janette Dawn Chantry	For service to local government, and to the community of Moonee Valley.	
Anthony Eugene Chaplin	For service to veterans and their families.	
Shirley Dawn Chapman	For service to charitable organisations.	
Dr David Timothy Chen	For service to medicine, and to professional associations.	
Emilee Jane Cherry	For service to sport as a gold medallist at the Rio 2016 Olympic Games.	
The Reverend Dr Roger Henry Chilton	For service to the Anglican Church of Australia, and to the community.	
The late Lieutenant Colonel Graeme Alistair Clark (Retired)	For service to veterans and their families.	
Edward Malcolm Clarke	For service to the community through sporting organisations.	
Paul Stephen Clarke	For service to international humanitarian health programs, and to the optical profession.	
The late John Arthur Clift	For service to the thoroughbred horse breeding and racing industries, and to the community.	
Duncan Cochrane	For service to canoe polo.	
Peter Joseph Cochrane	For service to the community through support for charitable organisations.	
Warren Alfred Cole	For service to the community through social welfare organisations.	
Barry Joseph Collier	For service to the Parliament of New South Wales, to the law, and to education.	
Barry John Collins	For service to local government, and to the community of Mount Gambier.	
Michael Dudley Collins Persse MVO	For service to secondary education, and to history.	
Trevor Robert Conlon	For service to heritage preservation, and to the community of the Coromandel Valley.	
Garry Robert Connelly	For service to the community of Coolah.	
Esma Beryl Coombe	For service to veterans and their families.	
Professor Gabrielle Mary Cooper	For service to the pharmacy sector, and to tertiary education.	
Graham John Cooper	For service to local government, and to the community of Cunderdin.	
Brian William Cossar	For service to veterans and their families, and to the community.	
Allyson Marie Costanzo	For service to people who are deaf or hard of hearing.	
Stewart Trevor Coutts	For service to the community of Benalla.	
Allister Mark Cox	For service to orchestral and choral music.	
Andrew Niven Creek	For service to business, particularly to the domestic gas industry.	
Douglas Charles Crocker	For service to the community of Armidale.	
Paul Vincent Crofts	For service to veterans and their families.	
Ruth Evelyn Crofts	For service to community history and heritage preservation.	
Anne Winifred Cronin	For service to community health, and to medical research organisations.	
Jill Elizabeth Cross	For service to the community of Dardanup.	
Lola May Cummins	For service to local government, and to the community of Junee.	
John Ross Cunningham	For service to the Indigenous community of Western Australia.	
Gwenyth Mary Cutler	For service to people with autism.	
Chloe Elysha Dalton	For service to sport as a gold medallist at the Rio 2016 Olympic Games.	
Dr Mirza Rajabati Datoo	For service to medicine as a general practitioner in rural New South Wales.	
Brayden Duane Davidson	For service to sport as a gold medallist at the Rio 2016 Paralympic Games.	
Heath Arthur Davidson	For service to sport as a gold medallist at the Rio 2016 Paralympic Games.	
Noela Isobel Davies	For service to nursing, and to international humanitarian healthcare programs.	
Jennifer Joan Davis	For service to the performing arts in Western Australia.	
Philip Davis	For service to cricket.	
Ronald Charles de Gruchy	For service to the superannuation industry, to seniors, and to the community of Joondalup.	
Professor Hugh Grant Dickson	For service to aged care and rehabilitation, and to medical education and administration.	
Robyn Elizabeth Dilger	For service to the community of Flinders Island.	
Bernard Carl Dingle	For service to military history.	
Timothy Malcolm Disken	For service to sport as a gold medallist at the Rio 2016 Paralympic Games.	
Marilyn Louise Dixon	For service to local government, and to the community of Bingara.	
Philomena Antoinette Docherty	For service to the community through a range of organisations.	
Meredith Anne Doig	For service to the community, to higher education, and to business.	
John Francis Donegan	For service to sport, and to the community of Casterton.	
Vedran Drakulic	For service to the community through a range of charitable organisations.	
Ronald Dryburgh	For service to the community of Albion Park.	
Wendy Elizabeth Drysdale	For service to the community, and to young women.	
Janet Mary Duhne	For service to surf lifesaving.	
Gregory James Duncan	For service to the community, and to the business and automotive sectors.	
William Brian Duncan	For service to veterans and their families.	
Andrew John Edmondson	For service to sport as a gold medallist at the Rio 2016 Paralympic Games.	
Colin John Edwards	For service to veterans and their families.	
Dr Ann Elizabeth Ellacott	For service to medicine, to community health, and to education.	
Angus James Emmott	For service to conservation and the environment.	
Peter Leon Enderby	For service to the community, particularly to Justices of the Peace.	
Chloe Jeannie Esposito	For service to sport as a gold medallist at the Rio 2016 Olympic Games.	
Margaret "Lee" Estens	For service to the community of Moree.	
Gemma Etheridge	For service to sport as a gold medallist at the Rio 2016 Olympic Games.	
Jean Marie Evans	For service to the beef cattle industry, and to the community.	
Dorothy Anne Every	For service to the community through a range of organisations.	
Samuel Ronald Eyres	For service to lawn bowls.	
John William Farmer	For service to optometry, and to the community.	
Benjamin John Fawcett	For service to sport as a gold medallist at the Rio 2016 Paralympic Games.	
Maureen Dorothy Fegan	For service to children and their families.	
Janice Dawn Ferguson	For service to the Indigenous communities of the Northern Territory.	
John Abbott Ferguson	For service to sailing, and to the community.	
Dr Allan Anthony Fife	For service to aged welfare, to business, and to the property sector.	
Charles David Figallo	For service to business, and to the community of South Australia.	
Frederick Bradley Finch	For service to maritime history preservation.	
Paul James Finch	For service to the community, particularly to social welfare.	
Simon Brett Finney	For service to the community through children's medical organisations.	
Associate Professor Gayle Olivia Fischer	For service to medicine in the field of dermatology.	
The late Wayne Stanley Fisher	For service to veterans and their families.	
Jack Miller Fletcher	For service to the primary industry sector in Western Australia.	
Robyn Nancy Florance	For service to community history and heritage preservation.	
Dr John Murray Flynn RFD	For service to medicine, and to medical education.	
Dr John Terence "Terry" Flynn	For service to medicine, and to medical administration.	
Michael Francis Foley	For service to the community of the Northern Territory.	
Dr Albert Edward Foreman	For service to medicine, particularly in rural and remote areas.	
Frank Reginald Fraser	For service to community music.	
Clinical Professor Gregory Ronald Fulcher	For service to medicine, and to medical administration.	
Michael Noel Gainger	For service to the community through children's charitable organisations.	
Robin Louise Gallen	For service to community health.	
Wayne Darwin Gardiner RFD	For service to military history, and to veterans and their families.	
Dr Jennifer Anne Gardner	For service to conservation and the environment.	
Dr Darryl John Gauld	For service to education, and to social justice and human rights.	
Angelo Gavrielatos	For service to industrial relations, and to educational organisations.	
Valerie May George	For service to the women's health, and to the community of the Nepean Valley.	
Eric Mervyn Giblett	For service to veterans and their families.	
Dr Patrick Hudson Giddings	For service to rural and remote medicine.	
Sandra Campbell Gorringe	For service to education administration, and as drama teacher.	
Leonard James Graff	For service to sports administration, and to the community.	
Athol David Graham	For service to the community of Benalla.	
Dr John Richard Graham	For service to medicine as a gastroenterologist.	
Peter Ross Graham	For service to swimming.	
Ellia Tiriseyani Green	For service to sport as a gold medallist at the Rio 2016 Olympic Games.	
Graham Norman Greenwood	For service to the print media as a journalist in rural areas.	
Janet Elizabeth Grieve	For service to the community through a range of organisations.	
Donald Stuart Gruber	For service to the community of the Australian Capital Territory.	
Kazimierz Grzesiak	For service to the Polish community of Victoria.	
Christopher John Hanley	For service to literature, and to Indigenous education.	
Ricky John Hanlon	For service to Australian rules football.	
Daryl James Hanly	For service to secondary education in Queensland.	
Jennifer Gibson Happell	For service to the community through voluntary roles with horticultural organisations.	
Eleanor Joy Hardie	For service to aviation through administrative roles.	
Vaughan Mark Harding	For service to aged care organisations.	
John Mitchell Hardy	For service to veterans and their families.	
Deirdre Joan Hargreaves	For service to the community of Ormiston.	
Jonathan Bruce Harris	For service to sport as a gold medallist at the Rio 2016 Paralympic Games.	
Rosemary Harris	For service to the community of Oberon.	
Colin Andrew Harrison	For service to sport as a gold medallist at the Rio 2016 Paralympic Games.	
Robert Gordon Harrison	For service to surveying, and to professional organisations.	
Ian Lance Hatcher	For service to lawn bowls.	
Geoffrey Eugene Healy	For service to the broadcast media through technical and engineering roles.	
Thomas John Heanly	For service to the community of Benalla.	
Dawn Lorrainne Heffernan	For service to education, and to the community.	
Neville Maxwell Heffernan	For service to education, and to the community.	
Alexander John Hehr	For service to the broadcast media, particularly through community radio.	
Darren Franz Helmann	For service to the community of Wyndham through a range of sporting clubs.	
Heather Emily Hewett MBE	For service to the Indigenous community of the Northern Territory.	
Terry Alan Hewett	For service to adventure tourism, and through fundraising roles for charitable organisations.	
Anthony William Hickey	For service to the community of the Gold Coast, and to charitable organisations.	
David Hedley Hicks	For service to the community through charitable organisations.	
Jennifer Joy Hill	For service to the rural community of Queensland.	
Kevin Herbert Hill	For service to local government, and to the community of Bankstown.	
Peter Donald Hitchener	For service to the broadcast media as a journalist and television presenter, and to the community.	
Michael Joseph Hobbs	For service to the visual arts as a supporter and benefactor.	
Charles Holckner	For service to the community through support for a range of organisations.	
Barbara Claire Holden	For service to lawn bowls.	
William Geoffrey Holdich	For service to Rugby Union in South Australia.	
Robert George Holden	For service to cricket.	
David Barry Holloway	For service to military history organisations.	
Ivan Ackland Holt	For service to the community through roles with social welfare organisations.	
Yvonne Lorraine Holt	For service to veterans and their families.	
Christine Julie Hopton	For service to surf lifesaving.	
Anne Margaret Horrigan-Dixon	For service to the community of Fitzroy, and through support for refugees.	
Mackenzie James Horton	For service to sport as a gold medallist at the Rio 2016 Olympic Games.	
Alan Winley Hoskins	For service to the Uniting Church in Australia, and to the community.	
Dr David John Hough	For service to the performing arts as a journalist and author.	
Clinical Professor Robert Bernard Howman-Giles	For service to nuclear medicine, and to professional organisations.	
Terry Thomas Hughes	For service to business, particularly in the education sector.	
Moreen Daphne Hull	For service to children, and to the community of Burnside.	
Richard Ingall	For service to the community of Cessnock.	
Keith Lindsay Irvine	For service to community health through a range of volunteer roles, and to social welfare organisations.	
Bela Janos Ivanyi	For service to the visual arts, particularly as an educator and mentor.	
Roland Elias Jabbour	For service to commerce and industry, and to Australian-Arab relations.	
Elizabeth June Jackson	For service to women, and to the community of Central Queensland.	
Mary Frances Jacquier	For service to Catholic education in South Australia.	
Ian Samuel Jarratt	For service to the community, particularly to the rights and protection of consumers.	
Thomas Francis Jehn	For service to veterans and their families.	
Leigh Andrew Johns	For service to the community through performing arts and primary health care organisations, and to industrial relations.	
Dorothy Eileen Johnson	For service to the community of New Lambton.	
John Stuart Johnstone	For service to rifle shooting.	
Glenys Margaret Joliffe	For service to table tennis.	
James Llewellyn Jones	For service to veterans and their families.	
Peter Jones	For service to public administration in Queensland, and to the art.	
Richard Leslie Jones	For service to the community of the Hunter.	
Sister Mary Kavanagh	For service to education, and to the Presentation Sisters Victoria.	
Antoine Kazzi	For service to the Lebanese community, and to journalism.	
Ian Gordon Kelly	For service to conservation and the environment in Western Australia.	
Dr Francis Michael Kelleher	For service to horse sports, and to agriculture education.	
Diane Lesley Kelly	For service to the community of north-west Tasmania through a range of organisations.	
Kathleen Margaret "Katie" Kelly	For service to sport as a gold medallist at the Rio 2016 Paralympic Games.	
Sandra Ann Kelly	For service to the Indigenous community of North Queensland.	
John Charles Kennedy	For service to local government, and to the community of Campbelltown.	
Dr Martha Louise Kent	For service to medicine, particularly to mental health.	
Dr Jennifer Kay King	For service to medicine in the field of obstetrics and gynaecology.	
Dr Leonard Jack Kliman	For service to medicine in the field of obstetrics and gynaecology.	
John Warner Knowles	For service to aged care delivery in Victoria.	
Vincent Kong	For service to the Chinese community of Sydney.	
Kerry Lee Kornhauser	For service to the community through a range of organisations.	
Leonard Michael Krause	For service to community music, particularly to brass bands.	
Sydney Michael Kruger	For service to local government, and to the community of the Fraser Coast.	
James Edward Lane	For service to veterans and their families.	
Maureen Claire Larkin	For service to the community of Penola.	
Michael Sidney Lawrence	For service to education, to youth, and to the community.	
Neville Denzil Lawrence	For service to the community of Gresford.	
Catherine Elaine Lawson	For service to horticultural history.	
Skye Playfair Leckie	For service to the community through fundraising and charitable support roles.	
Ivan Lewis Lee	For service to the community.	
Graham Stewart Lees	For service to surf lifesaving.	
Terence Patrick Lees	For service to the community of Mount Isa, and to mental health in rural and remote areas.	
Rosalind Sinclair Leigh	For service to the community through a range of organisations.	
Karen Jayne Leonard	For service to international humanitarian organisations.	
Michelle Maria Leonard	For service to the community, and to the performing arts.	
Francis Jeffrey Lewis	For service to the community of Moora, and to local government.	
Graham Noel Lewis	For service to the community through a range of volunteer roles.	
Kaye Florence Lewis	For service to the community of Moora.	
Matt Franklin Lewis	For service to sport as a gold medallist at the Rio 2016 Paralympic Games.	
Dr Vinh Binh Lieu	For service to the Vietnamese community of New South Wales, and to medicine.	
Beryl "Joan" Lindner	For service to the community of Tanunda.	
Barry Roland Ling	For service to athletics.	
Matthew David Linn	For service to the community through refugee support organisations.	
Kenneth James Longworth	For service to the community of Newcastle.	
Frederick John "Jack" Lunn	For service to the print media, and to the community.	
William Ewe Min Lye	For service to the law, to business, and to the promotion of cultural diversity.	
Ashleigh Kate McConnell	For service to sport as a gold medallist at the Rio 2016 Paralympic Games.	
Marion Josephine McConnell	For service to community health.	
William Colls McCutcheon	For service to local government, and to the community of the Western Downs.	
Neil Hugh MacDonald	For service to the community of Vasse.	
Michael John McEwan	For service to the community through a range of organisations.	
Dianne Maree MacFarlane	For service to the community of Echuca-Moama.	
Curtis Wain McGrath	For service to sport as a gold medallist at the Rio 2016 Paralympic Games.	
Kathrine Mary McGrath	For service to children, and to the broadcast media as a journalist.	
Robert John McInerney	For service to veterans and their families, and to surf lifesaving.	
Georgene Louise McKenzie-Hicks	For service to the international community, and to the Uniting Church in Australia.	
Emma McKeon	For service to sport as a gold medallist at the Rio 2016 Olympic Games.	
Peter K Mackinnon	For service to aged care in New South Wales.	
Stewart James McLeod PSM	For service to local government administration, and to the community of Dubbo.	
Margaret Elizabeth McMahon	For service to community health.	
Robert John McManus	For service to the community through a range of social welfare organisations.	
Susan Maree McQueen	For service to veterans and their families.	
Linda Marian Madill	For service to the community of Launceston.	
Meredith Parker "Maggie" Macguire	For service to the visual and performing arts in Victoria.	
Leonard Barry Mahemoff	For service to the Jewish community through a range of organisations.	
Helen Maree Mahoney	For service to the community, particularly to children.	
Dr William Borthwick Maiden PSM	For service to education in the Australian Capital Territory.	
Allan James Marsland	For service to cross country skiing.	
Susan Louise Marstaella	For service to local government, and to the community of the Mitchell Shire.	
Alfred Derrick Mason	For service to the community of Boorowa.	
Lindsay Bruce May	For service to sailing, and to health and social welfare groups.	
Raymond Francis Meagher	For service to the performing arts as an actor.	
William John Meaklim	For service to Australian rules football.	
Robert "Bruce" Mellett	For service to the broadcast media, and to the community of Renmark.	
William Harvey Mellor	For service to local government, and to the community of Gayndah.	
The Reverend Dr Wayne David Melrose	For service to tropical medicine, and to the community through chaplaincy roles.	
Professor Ian Arthur Meyers	For service to dentistry, to professional associations, and to tertiary education.	
The Reverend Neale Michael RFD	For service to the Uniting Church in Australia, and to the community.	
Patricia Mary Michell	For service to the creative arts in South Australia.	
Bernard Sean Millane	For service to local government, and to the communities of Whitehorse and Timor Leste.	
Helen Elaine Miller	For service to veterans and their families.	
Yair Phillip Miller	For service to the community through a range of organisations, and to interfaith relations.	
Barry Edward Minister	For service to the community, particularly through support for charitable organisations.	
Lynette Jean Molan	For service to the community, particularly to those mourning the loss of a child.	
Maisie Jean Moloney	For service to the community, particularly through youth organisations.	
Traudl Moon	For service to the performing arts through administrative roles with orchestras.	
Isobel Ann Morgan	For service to the community as a supporter and patron of social welfare and arts organisations.	
Janet Pauline Morris	For service to the community of Horsham.	
Jeanette Alice Morris	For service to aged persons in the Australian Capital Territory.	
Thomas John Morris	For service to the building and construction industry.	
Noeline Margaret Munro	For service to the community of the Southern Highlands.	
Kerry Wayne Murtagh	For service to veterans and their families.	
Jeanette Mustafa	For service to the Albanian community in Australia.	
Dawn Esther Nettheim	For service to music.	
Andrew John Newland RVM	For service to the Crown, and through support for charitable organisations.	
Peter Joseph Nickl	For service to youth through Scouting.	
Susan Mary Nixon	For service to the community, particularly to women.	
Colin James North	For service to charitable organisations, and to business.	
Susan Lesley Nurse	For service to the Uniting Church in Australia.	
Shirley Louise Org	For service to the community through disability support organisations.	
Carmel Therese O'Brien	For service to mental health and social welfare organisations.	
Dr Emma Kathryn O'Brien	For service to community health through music therapy programs.	
Judith Alexandra O'Brien	For service to the community of the Southern Highlands.	
William Elwin O'Brien	For service to the Indigenous community of northern New South Wales.	
Joan Kathleen O'Brien	For service to golf.	
Stephen John O'Connell	For service to the performing arts.	
Neville James Oddie	For service to conservation, and to reconciliation.	
John Gerrard O'Loughlin	For service to the community through church and social welfare groups.	
Margaret Therese O'Neill	For service to local government, and to the community of the Goulburn region.	
Alan Leslie Orrock	For service to the community through a range of organisations.	
Sister Mary Agnes O'Shannassy	For service to the community through church and social welfare bodies.	
Jill Betty Page	For service to the performing arts, and to the community.	
Brent Aris Palfreyman	For service to cricket in Tasmania.	
Archibald Park	For service to education, and to industrial arts.	
Elizabeth Anne Parkinson	For service to veterans and their families.	
Keith Raymond Parry	For service to the community, and to youth through Scouting.	
Shannon Michelle Parry	For service to sport as a gold medallist at the Rio 2016 Olympic Games.	
Lakeisha Dawn Patterson	For service to sport as a gold medallist at the Rio 2016 Olympic Games.	
Cecily Ann Pearson	For service to the Crown, and to public administration.	
Mary Louisa Peden	For service to botanical organisations, and to philanthropy.	
Evania Faeea Pelite	For service to sport as a gold medallist at the Rio 2016 Olympic Games.	
Elizabeth Dorothy Pender	For service to the community, particularly through social welfare organisations.	
Wing Commander Geoffrey Alan Peterkin (Retired)	For service to veterans and their families.	
Andrew James Petrie	For service to local government, to the financial sector, and to the community.	
Colin Alexander Philippson	For service to the community, and to motor racing.	
Ronald Alexander Pidcock	For service to the performing arts in Victoria.	
Bruce Pigdon	For service to the community of Yarrawonga.	
Anne Jenette Pratt	For service to the community through mental health support groups.	
Paul Robert Prestwich	For service to the community of South Australia.	
Gary John Pritchard	For service to children as a foster carer.	
Gaynor Iris Pritchard	For service to children as a foster carer.	
Andrew John Purchas	For service to rugby union, and to the promotion of social inclusion for LGBTI people.	
Alicia Jane Quirk	For service to sport as a gold medallist at the Rio 2016 Olympic Games.	
Julie Marjorie Raines	For service to the performing arts as a musician and teacher.	
Donald John Randall	For service to veterans and their families, and to the community.	
Reginald John Rankins	For service to the community of the Blue Mountains.	
Melanie Jane Raymond	For service to youth, to social welfare, and to the community.	
Dorothy Jean Reading	For service to community health, particularly to people with cancer.	
Scott Peter Reardon	For service to sport as a gold medallist at the Rio 2016 Paralympic Games.	
Vivienne Margaret Reed	For service to the visual arts.	
Shirley Margaret Reeves	For service to youth, and to the community.	
Hilda Merydith Reid	For service to golf, and to the community.	
Deirdre Yates Relph	For service to the community of Maffra.	
Patricia Mary Reynolds	For service to the Catholic Church in Australia.	
Clifford Anthony Richards	For service to veterans and their families.	
Associate Professor Gary Edward Richardson	For service to medicine, particularly in the area of oncology.	
Arthur George Rickersey	For service to youth, and to the community.	
Edmond James Roberts	For service to veterans, and to disability support organisations.	
Patricia Clive Roberts	For service to people with a disability, and to the community of Wollongong.	
Philip McKenzie Roberts	For service to the community of Ballarat.	
Squadron Leader Alan William Robertson CSM, RFD (Retired)	For service to veterans, and to the community.	
The late Eric Allen Robinson	For service to business in the area of professional audio and lighting equipment.	
Evelyn Elizabeth Robinson	For service to the community, particularly to persons separated by adoption.	
John Thomas Robinson BM	For service to the community of Victoria.	
Shirley May Robson	For service to the community of Tasmania.	
June Anne Roe	For service to veterans and their families.	
Roslyn Francis Rogers	For service to youth, and to charitable organisations.	
Frances Dorothy Rose	For service to victims of crime through advocacy and support roles.	
Associate Professor Mark Roth	For service to therapeutic optometry, and to professional bodies.	
Mavis John Rowlands	For service to conservation, to youth, and to the community.	
Margaret Elizabeth Rudwick	For service to women, and to the community.	
Alice Lillian Rule	For service to the community of Albany.	
Peter Charles Ryan	For service to veterans and their families.	
John Edward Salmon	For service to the environment, and to surf lifesaving.	
Kerryn Denise Salmon	For service to the environment, and to surf lifesaving.	
Anne Marie Salvador	For service to the international community through humanitarian programs.	
Dr Purushottam Sawrikar	For service to medicine, and to the Indian community of Sydney.	
Bryan John Schafer	For service to rugby league, and to veterans and their families.	
Dr Richard John Schloeffel	For service to medicine in the field of chronic and infectious disease.	
Noel Robert Schmidt	For service to community health.	
Norbert Joseph Schweizer	For service to the community through voluntary roles.	
The Honourable Barbara Mary Scott	For service to children, and to the Parliament of Western Australia.	
Padmini Maryse Sebastian	For service to multiculturalism, and to the community.	
Ann Marie Selle	For service to the community, and to health support programs.	
Marion Frances Sewell	For service to the community of Albany, and to youth.	
John Alexander Shalit	For service to the community, and to the construction industry.	
Dr George Anthony Simpson	For service to medicine, and to the community of Wauchope.	
Neil John Simpson	For service to cricket.	
David John Sinclair	For service to veterans and their families.	
Andrew Thomas Sincock	For service to cricket.	
Catherine Anne Skinner	For service to sport as a gold medallist at the Rio 2016 Olympic Games.	
Alex Smart	For service to conservation and the environment.	
Barbara Jean Smith	For service to the community of the Eurobodalla region.	
Bruce Allan Smith AFSM	For service to the community of the Eurobodalla region.	
Timothy James Smith	For service to public administration, and to maritime history preservation.	
Trevor Geoffrey Smith	For service to local government, and to the community of Corangamite.	
Allan John Sparkes CV	For service to mental health support organisations, and to the community.	
Janet Patricia Spooner	For service to the community through charitable organisations.	
Patricia Whitmore Spooner	For service to the community through volunteer roles.	
Dr Ranjana Srivastava	For service to medicine, particularly in the field of doctor-patient communication.	
Alan William Stafford	For service to the community of Benalla, and to bushfire recovery projects.	
Gary Starvrou	For service to the community, particularly through music.	
Ian Steel	For service to children through social welfare programs.	
William Parker Stephens	For service to the performing arts through a range of roles.	
Graeme John Stevenson	For service to the visual arts.	
Donald George Stewart	For service to the community of the Central Coast.	
Joan Katherine Stilgoe	For service to hockey, and to the community.	
Ralph Edward Stilgoe	For service to sailing, and to the community.	
The late Bronwyn Helen Stokes	For service to medicine in regional New South Wales.	
Shirley Margaret Stott Despoja	For service to the print media as a journalist.	
Graeme McLaren Stratford	For service to higher education administration, and to the community.	
Jacqueline Stricker-Phelps	For service to the community, particularly to human rights and social welfare.	
Henry John Stubbings	For service to music, and to the community of Geelong.	
Jack Oswald Sullivan	For service to community history.	
Janette Terese Sundell	For service to the performing arts, and to philanthropy.	
John Archibald Swan	For service to music as a performer, and to the community through charitable organisations.	
Ronald Maxwell Swan	For service to local government, and to the community of Port Stephens.	
Robert John Sweeney	For service to veterans and their families.	
Alan Synman	For service to the community, and to architecture.	
Kirsten Frances Tannenbaum	For service to community health in Western Australia.	
George Joseph Tatai	For service to gymnastics.	
Emma Louise Taylor	For service to international children's development organisations.	
Robyn te Velde	For service to the community of the Illawarra.	
Rosemary Ellen Terry	For service to the Catholic Church in Australia, and to the community.	
Tiffany Thomas Kane	For service to sport as a gold medallist at the Rio 2016 Paralympic Games.	
Dr Leslie Clifton Thompson	For service to medicine, particularly to urology.	
Peter Thomas Threlkeld	For service to sport, to the community of south west Sydney, and to the transport industry.	
James Joseph Tiberi	For service to the community of the Blue Mountains.	
Jeanette Alison Tidey	For service to hockey.	
Emma Kate Tonegato	For service to sport as a gold medallist at the Rio 2016 Olympic Games.	
Glynn Henry Topfer	For service to surf lifesaving.	
The late Brian Edward Trouville	For service to sport through canoeing, kayaking, and to surf lifesaving.	
Soterios Tsouris	For service to the Cypriot community of New South Wales.	
Wayne William Turley	For service to lawn bowls.	
John Archbold Turnbull	For service to secondary education.	
Amy Justine Turner	For service to sport as a gold medallist at the Rio 2016 Olympic Games.	
Catherine Elizabeth Turner	For service to aged welfare, particularly to women.	
James Michael Turner	For service to sport as a gold medallist at the Rio 2016 Paralympic Games.	
Carmel Beryl Tyers	For service to youth through Scouting, and to the community.	
Adrian Anthony Unger	For service to people with Parkinson's disease.	
David Thomas Uther	For service to the community through a range of organisations.	
Raymond Stanley Vincent	For service to the community through a range of organisations.	
Charles Gregory Wade	For service to the community through a range of volunteer roles.	
Kristian Jules Wale	For service to youth, and to the community.	
Pamela Joy Walker	For service to the Uniting Church in Australia, and to pastoral care programs.	
Paul Brian Walshe	For service to the communities of Queanbeyan and Canberra.	
Terence John Wand	For service to rugby league.	
Robert Fraser Ward	For service to business, particularly to the motion picture industry.	
Jayden Daniel Warn	For service to sport as a gold medallist at the Rio 2016 Paralympic Games.	
Neil Geoffrey Warren	For service to the community of South Gippsland.	
Alicia Jean Watson	For service to the community through church and fundraising bodies.	
Rachael Elizabeth Watson	For service to sport as a gold medallist at the Rio 2016 Paralympic Games.	
Joyce Valerie Watt	For service to aged care, and to the community.	
Dr Robert Stanley Webster	For service to veterans and their families, and to the community of Victoria.	
William John Wheeldon	For service to local government, and to the community of Wentworth.	
The Reverend Dr Graham John Whelan	For service to veterans and their families, and to the community of Coffs Harbour.	
Aileen Patricia White	For service to the community through charitable organisations.	
The Reverend Brother Anthony James White	For service to education, and to the Catholic Church in Queensland.	
Margery Lola Whitehead	For service to the community through a range of volunteer roles.	
Julianne Mary Whyte	For service to community health through palliative care programs.	
Malcolm John Whyte	For service to youth, and to the community of Echuca.	
Dr James Francis Wilkinson	For service to medicine, and to choral music.	
John Douglas Williams	For service to the Parliament of New South Wales, and to the community of Broken Hill.	
Sharni Maree Williams	For service to sport as a gold medallist at the Rio 2016 Olympic Games.	
Ken Wilson	For service to people who are homeless, and to the community.	
Leone Eugenie Wilson	For service to veterans and their families, and to the community of Bundaberg.	
Madison Maree Wilson	For service to sport as a gold medallist at the Rio 2016 Olympic Games.	
Raymond Ian Wilson	For service to the community, and to sport.	
Susan Jean Wilson	For service to the community of Portarlington.	
Mark Lester Windon	For service to surfing through administrative roles.	
John Theodor Wittwer	For service to the community of Hahndorf.	
McRae Norman Wood	For service to the community of Latrobe, and to youth.	
Dr Ronald Woods	For service to science, particularly in the field of electrochemistry.	
Sheriden Christine Wright	For service to youth, and to the community of Toowoomba.	
Peter Muir Wyllie	For service to surf lifesaving, and to the community of Terrigal.	
Yi Xu	For service to education, and to the Chinese community of New South Wales.	
Philip John Yeo	For service to local government, to the community of the Wingecarribee, and to education.	
Richard Gordon York	For service to Australia-Czech Republic relations.	
Dr Keith Warrington Zabell	For service to medicine, particularly to ophthalmology.	
Dr Allan Hyam Zavod	For service to the performing arts as a musician and composer.	

==== Military Division ====
Branch	Recipient	Citation	Notes
Navy	Commander Geoffrey Norman Fielder RAN	For meritorious performance of duty in the field of Navy liaison and communication with higher Headquarters, Ministers and Government.	
Navy	Commander Steven Brian Reid RAN	For meritorious performance of duty in the field of Navy Mine Warfare command and leadership.	
Navy	Warrant Officer Nikolai Geoffrey Rofe	For meritorious performance of duty as a Senior Sailor in the field of training and maritime operational preparedness.	
Navy	Commander Richard Malcolm Westoby RAN	For meritorious service in the field of amphibious warfare development in the Royal Australian Navy.	
Army	Warrant Officer Class One Kevin Charles Bishop	For meritorious service in the field of Combat and Construction Engineering.	
Army	Mark Leslie Gaskell	For meritorious service in the fields of personnel management and training development.	
Army	Major Martin Lenicka	For meritorious service in successive Regimental Sergeant Major positions.	
Air Force	Group Captain Jason Werner Agius CSC	For meritorious service to the Australian Defence Force in the fields of work, health and safety; hazardous chemical remediation and technical personnel capability development.	

== Meritorious Service ==
=== Public Service Medal (PSM) ===
Public Service Medal ribbon

State/ Territory	Recipient	Citation	Notes
Federal	David John Braggett	For outstanding public service in the area of aged care reform	
Federal	Rhana Sheila Crago	For outstanding public service in the role of Executive Assistant in the Health and Finance portfolios.	
Federal	Maria Fernandez	For outstanding public service in advancing Australia's interest.	
Federal	Katrina Anne Harry	For outstanding public service in the area of veteran's entitlements.	
Federal	Nicole Allison Hinder	For outstanding public service in the area of biosecurity management.	
Federal	Roxanne Louise Kelley	For outstanding public service in the areas of public sector reform and governance, particularly in the Defence portfolio.	
Federal	Matthew John Koval	For outstanding public service to the advancement of Australian agriculture.	
Federal	Paul Gregory Lang RFD	For outstanding public service through the provision of legal advice to the Commonwealth.	
Federal	Dr Ralph Lattimore	For outstanding public service in the area of economic and social policy reform.	
Federal	Michael Robert Pennell	For outstanding public service in the development of the terrorism insurance scheme.	
NSW	Stephanie Susan Brown	For outstanding public service to education in New South Wales as a teacher and administrator.	
NSW	Mira Haramis	For outstanding public service to education and training in the health sector in New South Wales.	
NSW	Dr Pedro Thomas Harris	For outstanding public service in New South Wales through the design and delivery of information technology solutions.	
NSW	Gregorie George McTaggart	For outstanding public service to the maintenance and conservation of the Sydney Opera House.	
NSW	Peter Joseph Riordan	For outstanding public service to industrial relations and education in New South Wales.	
NSW	Graham Patrick Tobin	For outstanding public service to the roads and maritime sector in New South Wales.	
NSW	Mark Phillip Wilson	For outstanding public service to the correctional sector in New South Wales.	
VIC	Professor Michael John Ackland	For outstanding public service through contributions to the health and wellbeing of people in Victoria.	
VIC	Maree Amanda Cameron	For outstanding public service to residential aged care standards and improved quality of life for older persons in Victoria.	
VIC	Dr Robin Anthony Hirst	For outstanding public service through the development of community engagement with the museum and galleries sector in Victoria.	
VIC	David "Graham" Parkes AFSM	For outstanding public service to park management and environmental conservation in Victoria.	
VIC	Professor German Carlos Spangenberg	For outstanding public service through scientific research programs in the agricultural sector in Victoria.	
VIC	Gemma Cecilia Varley	For outstanding public service through the drafting of legislation in Victoria.	
VIC	Michael Lawrence Wells	For outstanding public service through the protection of rights for disadvantaged and vulnerable people in Victoria.	
QLD	Randall Burton Cox	For outstanding public service to the natural resources sector in Queensland.	
QLD	Dr Philip John Moody	For outstanding public service to the environmental sector in Queensland.	
QLD	Gerald Marian Murphy	For outstanding public service to the transport and main roads sector.	
QLD	Kevin James Yearbury	For outstanding public service to the state of Queensland.	
WA	Stuart Jardine	For outstanding public service to local government in Western Australia.	
SA	Rosina Antenucci	For outstanding public service to education and to the teaching of English as an additional language.	
SA	Robert Glen Schwartz	For outstanding public service in the field of intergovernmental fiscal relations, taxation policy and economic policy.	
SA	Joyleen Joan Thomas	For outstanding public service in the area of employment, cultural inclusiveness and Indigenous events.	
ACT	Kerryn Eileen Ernst	For outstanding public service to community health in the Australian Capital Territory.	
ACT	Ian David Hill	For outstanding public service to the tourism sector in the Australian Capital Territory.	
ACT	Andrew James Kefford	For outstanding public service to the community of the Australian Capital Territory through administrative roles.	
NT	Teresa Mary Hart	For outstanding public service to governance, planning and administration in the Northern Territory.	

=== Australian Police Medal (APM) ===
Australian Police Medal ribbon

State/ Territory	Recipient	Notes
Federal	Detective Sergeant Mark Bradley Elvin	
Federal	Detective Sergeant Andrea Humphrys	
Federal	Assistant Commissioner David John Sharpe	
NSW	Detective Chief Inspector David Alfred Adney	
NSW	Chief Inspector Tracy Maree Chapman	
NSW	Superintendent Anthony Paul Crandell	
NSW	Chief Inspector David Ian Forbes	
NSW	Senior Constable Paul Stephen Jones	
NSW	Detective Chief Inspector David Laidlaw	
NSW	Chief Inspector Christopher Andrew Smith	
NSW	Chief Inspector Kim Rene Sorensen	
NSW	Superintendent Mark Andrew Wright	
VIC	Assistant Commissioner Debra Joan Abbott	
VIC	Commander Susan Mary Clifford	
VIC	Senior Sergeant Philip David Eager	
VIC	Superintendent Michael John Sayer	
VIC	Detective Senior Sergeant Adam John Shoesmith	
VIC	Detective Leading Senior Constable Katrina Sue Thomas	
VIC	Detective Senior Sergeant Troy Derek Thomson	
VIC	Inspector Gillian Wilson	
QLD	Superintendent Amanda Jane Brownhill	
QLD	Sergeant Paula Anne Byrne	
QLD	Inspector Peter Michael Flanders	
QLD	Detective Inspector Christopher Glenn Jory	
QLD	Inspector Trevor William Kidd	
QLD	Superintendent Michelle Francis Young	
WA	Detective Superintendent Francis John Brandham	
WA	Detective Senior Sergeant Thomas Eric Mills	
WA	Superintendent Susan Young	
SA	Senior Sergeant Trudy Jean Andresen	
SA	Detective Senior Sergeant First Class Grant Andrew Garrity	
SA	Senior Sergeant First Class Manfred Helmut Wojtasik	
TAS	Senior Sergeant Danny Hilton Russell	
TAS	Sergeant Lee-Anne Marie Walters	
NT	Superintendent Charles Robert Farmer	
NT	Senior Aboriginal Community Police Officer Betty Herbert	

=== Australian Fire Service Medal (AFSM) ===
Australian Fire Service Medal ribbon

State/ Territory	Recipient	Notes
NSW	Harvey Alan Bailey	
NSW	Graham Charles Bennett	
NSW	Brian Kevin Clarke	
NSW	John Cullen	
NSW	James Robert Fahey	
NSW	David Frederick Felton	
NSW	Ian Lindsay Grimwood	
NSW	John Kjoller	
NSW	Trevor Richard Penfold	
VIC	Anthony Reginald Arthur	
VIC	Henry Charles Barton	
VIC	William Bowery	
VIC	Adam Edward Dalrymple	
VIC	Kendra Leigh-Ann Dean	
VIC	Paul Leslie King	
VIC	Graham Petrie	
VIC	Philip Scott Pringuer	
VIC	James "Donald" Robertson	
QLD	Stephen Ross Christie	
QLD	Alexander Charles Moroney	
QLD	Joseph Gerard Ryan	
WA	Paul Edward Brarker	
WA	John Charles Tillman	
SA	Glenn Paul Benham	
SA	Robert George Davis	
SA	Corey Robert Dunn	
SA	Allan Malcolm Voigt	
TAS	Leo Thomas Berechree	
TAS	David Russell Bonney	
TAS	Jeffrey Jeffrey Smith	
ACT	Richard Francis Maloney	
NT	Mark Anthony Spain	

=== Ambulance Service Medal (ASM) ===
Ambulance Service Medal ribbon

State/ Territory	Recipient	Notes
NSW	Rosemary Joyce Hegner	
NSW	Allan Ross Loudfoot	
NSW	Desiree Jane O'Brien	
NSW	Susan Onlea Webster	
VIC	Henry Ernest Brindley	
VIC	Glenys Marion Chapman	
VIC	Colin Jones	
VIC	Lindsay Rose Jones	
VIC	Michelle Margaret Murphy	
VIC	Paul Wilkinson	
QLD	Craig Emery	
QLD	Patrick Michael Holdsworth	
WA	David "Paul" Davies	
WA	Paul Henry Gaughan	
WA	Denise Kathleen Lane	
SA	Andrew John Hillier	
SA	Duncan Colin Johnstone	
SA	Sheryl Annette Lewis	
TAS	Monica Charlotte Baker	
TAS	John Leonard Campbell ESM	
TAS	Kaye Caroline Fox	

=== Emergency Services Medal (ESM) ===
Emergency Services Medal ribbon

State/ Territory	Recipient	Notes
NSW	Shannon Noel Crofton	
NSW	Garry Thomas Smith APM	
VIC	Shane John Lapworth	
VIC	Garry William Moncrieff	
VIC	John Alan Retchford	
QLD	Paul Gregory Kelly	
QLD	David Malcolm McLean	
WA	Phillip S Bresser	
WA	Jeffrey Philip Howe	
WA	Christopher Ian Johns	
SA	John Russell Baker	
SA	Shane Michael Daw	
SA	Michael Wayne Fix	
TAS	Christopher Malcolm Fagg OAM	
TAS	Mhairi Jane Revie	
TAS	Andrew Charles Taylor AFSM	
NT	Keith W Hutton	

== Distinguished and Conspicuous Service ==
=== Distinguished Service Cross (DSC) ===
Distinguished Service Cross ribbon

Branch	Recipient	Citation	Notes
Navy	RADM Trevor Jones, AO, CSC, RAN	For distinguished command and leadership in warlike operations as the Commander Joint Task Force 633 while deployed to the Middle East Region from November 2014 to January 2016.	
Army	COL G	For distinguished command and leadership in warlike operations in Iraq in 2015.	
Army	COL Matthew Jeremy Galton	For distinguished command and leadership in warlike operations as the Commander Task Group Taji in Iraq in 2015.	
Army	LTCOL S	For distinguished command and leadership in warlike operations in Iraq.	
Air Force	GCAPT P	For distinguished command and leadership in warlike operations in Iraq in 2015.	
Air Force	GCAPT S	For distinguished command and leadership in warlike operations as Commander Air Task Group 630 in Iraq from July 2015 to January 2016.	

=== Distinguished Service Medal (DSM) ===
Distinguished Service Medal ribbon

Branch	Recipient	Citation	Notes
Navy	Chief Petty Officer Paul Nicholas Mayer	For distinguished leadership in warlike operations during a complex insurgent attack in Kabul on 7 August 2015.	
Army	Colonel Ashley Raymond Collingburn	For distinguished leadership in warlike operations as the Training Task Unit Commander, within Task Group Taji One in Iraq in 2015.	
Army	Colonel Susan May Coyle, CSC	For distinguished leadership in warlike operations as the Deputy Commander of Joint Task Force 636 and Commander Task Group 633.6 from June 2014 to July 2015.	
Army	Major R	For distinguished leadership in warlike operations while deployed as Officer Commanding, Commando Company Group in Iraq.	

=== Commendation for Distinguished Service ===
Commendation for Distinguished Service ribbon

Branch	Recipient	Citation	Notes
Navy	Captain Shane Leonard Glassock, CSC, RAN	For distinguished performance in warlike operations as a senior advisor to the Afghan Ministry of Interior.	
Army	Captain A	For distinguished performance of duties in warlike operations as Commander of a Special Forces Advisory Team in Iraq.	
Army	Corporal C	For distinguished performance in warlike operations as an advisor to 1st Iraqi Special Forces Brigade in Iraq.	
Army	Brigadier Justin Frederick Ellwood, DSC	For distinguished performance of duties in warlike operations as the Chief Joint Operations in Headquarters Resolute Support Kabul Afghanistan from September 2014 to September 2015.	
Army	Lieutenant Colonel Damien Leslie Green	For distinguished performance of duties in warlike operations as a Mentor and Deputy Senior National Representative at the Afghanistan National Army Officer Academy from September 2014 to July 2015.	
Army	Private J	For distinguished performance of duties in warlike operations providing critical medical support and clinical care.	
Army	Captain R	For distinguished performance of duties in warlike operations providing intelligence support in Iraq.	
Army	Corporal R	For distinguished performance of duties in warlike operations in providing coalition strike support.	
Air Force	Wing Commander G	For distinguished performance of duties in warlike operations as Commander of a Task Unit and the National Target Engagement Authority between November 2015 and March 2016.	
Air Force	Squadron Leader J	For distinguished performance of duties in warlike operations and outstanding airmanship.	
Air Force	Wing Commander M	For distinguished performance of duties in warlike operations as Commander Task Unit 630.2 and the National Target Engagement Authority between June 2015 and November 2015.	

=== Bar to the Conspicuous Service Cross (CSC & Bar) ===
Conspicuous Service Cross and Bar ribbon

Branch	Recipient	Citation	Notes
Army	Brigadier Michael David Bond, CSC	For outstanding achievement in enhancing the operational processes and outcomes of the United Nations Mission in South Sudan.	
Army	Brigadier Nagy Maher Sorial, CSC	For outstanding achievement supporting the execution of multiple complex military operations throughout the Middle East Region.	

=== Conspicuous Service Cross (CSC) ===
Conspicuous Service Cross ribbon

Branch	Recipient	Citation	Notes
Navy	Captain Jonathan Paul Earley, RAN	For outstanding achievement and devotion to duty in maritime operational and humanitarian response planning and deployment.	
Navy	Commodore Stephen John Hughes, RAN	For outstanding devotion to duty in the field of major warship introduction into service with the Royal Australian Navy.	
Navy	Commander Douglas Macleod Theobald, RAN	For outstanding achievement in the field of submarine operations and Fleet Anti-Submarine Warfare.	
Army	Warrant Officer Class Two Kevin Anthony Battste	For outstanding achievement as the Regimental Quartermaster at the 1st Recruit Training Battalion.	
Army	Lieutenant Colonel Kurt Stephen Black-Sinclair	For outstanding achievement as the Commanding Officer of the 1st Military Police Battalion.	
Army	Lieutenant Colonel Nicholas John Bosio	For outstanding achievement in the development of the operational Campaign Plan for the Combined Joint Task Force Headquarters in support of Operation Inherent Resolve.	
Army	Colonel Malcolm Geoffrey Brick	For outstanding achievement in the management of logistic assets and support as Commander Joint Logistics Unit (East).	
Army	Lieutenant Colonel Lara Terese Bullpitt-Troy	For outstanding achievement as the Staff Officer Grade One - Operations and Plans, Headquarters 1st Joint Movement Group.	
Army	Lieutenant Colonel Nicholas Andrew Duff	For outstanding devotion to duty to clinical training and preparedness of health services personnel as the deputy director of Clinical Services, 2nd General Health Battalion, from 2012 to 2015.	
Army	Lieutenant Colonel Graham Malcolm Goodwin	For outstanding achievement as the Commanding Officer of the 10th/27th Battalion, the Royal South Australia Regiment.	
Army	Lieutenant Colonel Leslie Juckel	For outstanding achievements in modernising digital networking and battle management systems capabilities.	
Army	Lieutenant Colonel David Christopher McGarry	For outstanding achievement as Commander Australian Contingent with the Multinational Force and Observers, Sinai Peninsula, Egypt.	
Army	Lieutenant Colonel Daven Ray Pettersen	For outstanding devotion to duty as Deputy Director International Engagement, Army.	
Army	Lieutenant Colonel Mark Hamilton Stone	For outstanding achievement as Acting Commanding Officer 9th Force Support Battalion and Staff Officer Grade One Logistics, Headquarters 1st Division/Deployable Joint Force Headquarters.	
Army	Captain Wayne Michael Vickers, CSM	For outstanding achievement in the innovation of digital communications.	
Air Force	Sergeant Craig Allan Barnes	For outstanding achievement as combat control team assault zone survey specialist at Number 4 Squadron, Royal Australian Air Force.	
Air Force	Wing Commander Bradley John Clarke, OAM	For outstanding achievement in organisation and aerospace capability development as Commanding Officer of Number 35 Squadron, Royal Australian Air Force.	
Air Force	Squadron Leader Adrian Gerard Greener	For outstanding achievement in organisation and aerospace capability development as Commanding Officer of Number 35 Squadron, Royal Australian Air Force.	
Air Force	Group Captain Andrew Nigel Lancaster	For outstanding achievement as Commanding Officer of Number 382 Expeditionary Combat Support Squadron and Director Engagement, Headquarters Joint Operations Command.	
Air Force	Wing Commander Amanda Jane Leslie	For outstanding devotion to duty in Air Force Reserve personnel administration and management.	
Air Force	Squadron Leader Rodney Charles Orrock	For outstanding devotion to duty as the KC-30A Multi Role Tanker Transport Weapon System Support Manager in the Heavy Air Lift Systems Program Office.	
Air Force	Group Captain S	For outstanding achievement in air combat development and preparedness as Commanding Officer of Number 1 Squadron, Royal Australian Air Force.	

=== Bar to the Conspicuous Service Medal (CSM & Bar) ===
CSM & Bar ribbon

Branch	Recipient	Citation	Notes
Navy	Captain Michael Joseph Turner, CSM, RAN	For meritorious achievement in enhancing the Australian Defence Force's counternarcotic operations.	

=== Conspicuous Service Medal (CSM) ===
Conspicuous Service Medal ribbon

Branch	Recipient	Citation	Notes
Navy	Chief Petty Officer Brian William Craig	For meritorious achievement in executing the material support preparations for the certification, delivery and introduction into service of HMAS Adelaide.	
Navy	Chief Petty Officer Gregory Neil Fletcher	For meritorious devotion to duty in the field of propulsion management in HMAS Perth.	
Navy	Lieutenant Commander Kathryn Rebecca Ford RAN	For meritorious achievement in the development and implementation of the Australian Defence Force Training Systems School.	
Navy	Lieutenant Commander Christopher William Neech RAN	For meritorious achievement in the field of Guided Missile Frigate maintenance management.	
Navy	Commander Gemma Maree Pumphrey RAN	For meritorious devotion to duty in the field of Defence communications and information infrastructure and services.	
Navy	Warrant Officer Brendan Andrew Woodsell OAM	For meritorious devotion to duty in the field of Navy values reform and training for recruits at HMAS Cerberus.	
Army	Sergeant Kim Maree Allen	For meritorious achievement as a Multi-Media Technician Supervisor within 1st Intelligence Battalion.	
Army	Warrant Officer Class Two Matthew Russell Crighton	For meritorious achievement in the development and implementation of embarked force coordination procedures in the Canberra Class Landing Helicopter Dock Ships.	
Army	Warrant Officer Class Two D	For meritorious devotion to duty in the field of specialist communications training and support to special operations.	
Army	Signaller John Kenneth Davies	For meritorious devotion to duty as an Information Systems Technician, 7th Signal Regiment (Electronic Warfare).	
Army	Lieutenant Colonel Damian Andrew Drain	For meritorious achievement in the field of capital facilities and infrastructure project development.	
Army	Warrant Officer Class Two Phillip Matthew Grieve	For meritorious achievement developing Army's Shadow Unmanned Aerial System capability.	
Army	Sergeant Rodney James Leece	For meritorious devotion to duty as a Land Intelligence Instructor within the Defence Force School of Intelligence.	
Army	Captain Stephen Andrew Lomas	For meritorious devotion to duty in the field of logistics management and support.	
Army	Sergeant S	For meritorious devotion to duty delivering deployable capability and training as a member of the 1st Commando Regiment.	
Army	Warrant Officer Class One Simon Peter Thompson	For meritorious achievement in force generation and training for the Royal Regiment of Australian Artillery.	
Air Force	Squadron Leader Tanya Michelle Evans	For meritorious achievement in training delivery and organisational development as Chief Instructor of the Officers' Training School, Royal Australian Air Force.	
Air Force	Wing Commander Anthony George Grimmer	For meritorious achievement in engineer and technical workforce management in the Royal Australian Air Force.	
Air Force	Flight Sergeant Daniel Anthony Harvey	For meritorious achievement as the Senior Hypobaric Chamber Operator at the Royal Australian Air Force Institute of Aviation Medicine.	
Air Force	Flight Sergeant M	For meritorious achievement as Senior Non-Commissioned Officer -Targets, Operation OKRA Air Task Group; and as Acting Officer in Charge - Target Materials Section, Number 460 Squadron.	
Air Force	Squadron Leader Stuart John Mattner	For meritorious achievement in the fields of explosive ordnance and precision guided munitions.	
