= Diana Martin (scientist) =

New Zealand microbiologist (1942–2019)

Diana Martin ONZM
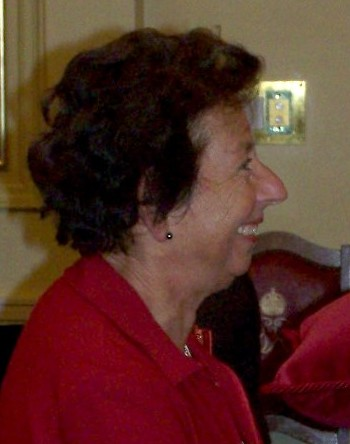
- Martin receiving her ONZM in 2008
- Born: Diana Rae France; 7 February 1942; Wellington, New Zealand
- Died: 31 December 2019 (aged 77)
- Education: University of London
- Spouse: Peter Martin (m. 1969)
- Scientific career
- Workplaces: New Zealand Communicable Disease Centre; Institute of Environmental Science and Research
- Thesis: Variation in Pseudomonas aeruginosa (1971)

Diana Rae Martin (née France; 7 February 1942 – 31 December 2019) was a New Zealand microbiologist. She was a Fellow of the Royal Society Te Apārangi from 2000, and was made an Officer of the New Zealand Order of Merit for services to microbiology in 2008.

== Early life and education ==
Martin was born Diana Rae France in Wellington on 7 February 1942, the daughter of Udall and Thelma France. She followed a Bachelor of Science in 1963 from the University of Otago with an MSc(Hons) in microbiology in 1965, with a thesis titled Observations on the distribution and bacteriophage typing of the genus proteus.

She worked for the National Health Institute in Wellington for two years, and then in 1968 moved to the Central Public Health Laboratory in London, where she was in charge of the Pseudomonas Laboratory. During her time in London, she obtained her PhD on microbial epidemiology from the University of London, submitting her thesis, Variation in Pseudomonas aeruginosa, in 1971.

== Research ==
Martin returned to New Zealand in 1972, where she initially worked for Wellington Polytechnic as a microbiology tutor, until 1975. After this point she worked for the National Health Institute, the New Zealand Communicable Disease Centre and the Institute of Environmental Science and Research (ESR). Martin was instrumental in the creation of the Group B meningococcal OMV vaccine (MeNZB) for New Zealand. She retired in 2011.

== Honours and awards ==
Martin was elected a Fellow of the Royal Society Te Apārangi in 2000. In the 2008 Queen's Birthday Honours, she was appointed an Officer of the New Zealand Order of Merit, for services to microbiology.

== Personal life ==
In 1969, she married Peter David Martin, a respiratory physician. In the 2016 Queen's Birthday Honours, Peter Martin was appointed an Officer of the New Zealand Order of Merit, for services to tobacco control.

Diana Martin died on 31 December 2019 after a "long, debilitating illness". She was survived by her husband and two children.

== Selected works ==
- Johan Holst; Martin, Diana Rae; Arnold, Richard; Concepcion Campa Huergo; Oster, Philipp; Jane O'Hallahan; Rosenqvist, Einar (2009). "Properties and clinical performance of vaccines containing outer membrane vesicles from Neisseria meningitidis". Vaccine. 27 Suppl 2: B3-12. doi:10.1016/j.vaccine.2009.04.071. PMID 19481313. Wikidata Q34983894.
- Murphy, Ellen; Lubomira Andrew; Kwok-Leung Lee; et al. (2009). "Sequence diversity of the factor H binding protein vaccine candidate in epidemiologically relevant strains of serogroup B Neisseria meningitidis". The Journal of Infectious Diseases. 200 (3): 379–389. doi:10.1086/600141. PMID 19534597. Wikidata Q46777542.
- Fanrong Kong; Sonia Gowan; Martin, Diana Rae; Gregory James; Gilbert, Lyn (2002). "Serotype identification of group B streptococci by PCR and sequencing". Journal of Clinical Microbiology. 40 (1): 216–226. doi:10.1128/jcm.40.1.216-226.2002. PMC 120111. PMID 11773119. Wikidata Q33946289.
- Ray Borrow; Ingeborg S Aaberge; George F Santos; T Lynn Eudey; Oster, Philipp; Anne Glennie; Findlow, Jamie; E Arne Høiby; Rosenqvist, Einar; Paul Balmer; Diana Martin (2005). "Interlaboratory standardization of the measurement of serum bactericidal activity by using human complement against meningococcal serogroup b, strain 44/76-SL, before and after vaccination with the Norwegian MenBvac outer membrane vesicle vaccine". Clinical and Vaccine Immunology. 12 (8): 970–976. doi:10.1128/cdli.12.8.970-976.2005. PMC 1182195. PMID 16085915. Wikidata Q33910760.
- Fanrong Kong; Sonia Gowan; Martin, Diana Rae; Gregory James; Gilbert, Lyn (2002). "Molecular profiles of group B streptococcal surface protein antigen genes: relationship to molecular serotypes". Journal of Clinical Microbiology. 40 (2): 620–626. doi:10.1128/jcm.40.2.620-626.2002. PMC 153396. PMID 11825981. Wikidata Q34945913.
- Jane O'Hallahan; Lennon, Diana Rosemary; Oster, Philipp; Robbie Lane; Stewart Reid; Mulholland, Kim; Joanna Stewart; Liane Penney; Percival, Teuila Mary; Martin, Diana Rae (2005). "From secondary prevention to primary prevention: a unique strategy that gives hope to a country ravaged by meningococcal disease". Vaccine. 23 (17–18): 2197–2201. doi:10.1016/j.vaccine.2005.01.061. PMID 15755594. Wikidata Q44629684.
