= David Suarez =

David Suarez may refer to:

- David Suarez (politician) (born 1977), Filipino politician
- David Suarez (virologist) (born 1964), American virologist and immunologist
- David Suarez (footballer), (born 1979), French retired footballer
