= Yvonne Lue =

Jamaican microbiologist

Yvonne Lue is a Jamaican medical microbiologist. She is the President for the New York City Branch of the American Society for Microbiology (ASM). Lue is one of the few Black women who have led clinical microbiology since the 1950 thru 1970s.

== Early life ==
Lue is from Jamaica. She completed a bachelor's degree in biology at Long Island University, Brooklyn (1966–1970), a doctorate in microbiology at Columbia Graduate School of Arts and Sciences (1970–1976), and postdoctoral training in clinical microbiology at Columbia University College of Physicians and Surgeons (1976–1978). She has been involved with the American Society for Microbiology for many years.

== Career ==
In 1984, Lue passed the ABMM examination, becoming one of the few Black women to do so at the time. She held positions as director of the Microbiology and Virology departments at the Teterboro facility of Quest Diagnostics (1992–2007). From 2000 to 2008, Lue was a member of the Planning Committee for the University Symposia in Clinical Laboratory Medicine at the UMDNJ Center for Continuing and Outreach Education. From 2008-2010, she was the director for Long Island Jewish Medical Center, Clinical Laboratories in Microbiology. She also held part-time and consulting positions at Enzo Clinical Labs Inc.(2008–2013) and aLab Services (2012–2014).

Lue served on several ASM committees, including as a Member-at-Large representing branches on the Journal of Clinical Microbiology editorial board and the Council Policy Committee (CPC). She is currently the President of the New York City Branch of ASM (American Society for Microbiology).
