= Robin Patel =

Canadian microbiologist

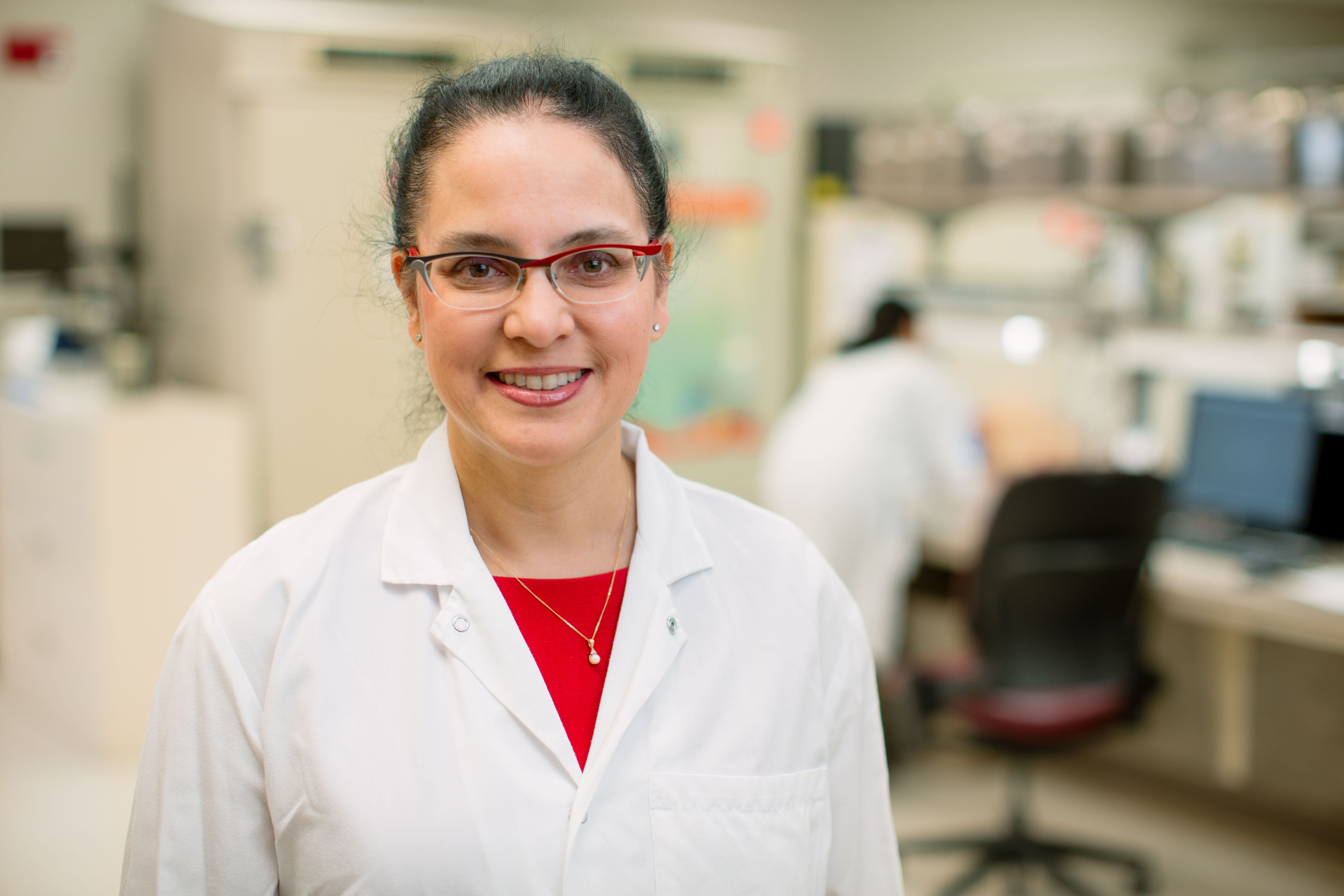
- Born: Winnipeg, Manitoba, Canada
- Education: Princeton University; McGill University
- Occupations: Doctor, researcher
- Medical career
- Profession: Professor of Microbiology and Medicine at the Mayo Clinic
- Field: Microbiology
- Institutions: Mayo Clinic
- Sub-specialties: Infectious disease, immunology
- Research: Biofilm-mediated infections, prosthetic joint infection, Animal models of infection, Clinical bacteriology diagnostic assays
- Website: Mayo faculty page

Robin Patel is a Canadian born microbiologist and Elizabeth P. and Robert E. Allen Professor of Individualized Medicine, a Professor of Microbiology, and a Professor of Medicine at the Mayo Clinic. She is widely recognized as a leader in the field of clinical microbiology and has held a variety of leadership positions including 2019–2020 President of the American Society for Microbiology (ASM) and Director of the Antibacterial Resistance Leadership Group (ARLG) Laboratory Center of the National institutes of Health. She is currently the Vice Chair of Education in the Department of Laboratory Medicine and Pathology at the Mayo Clinic, and Director of the Mayo Clinic's Infectious Diseases Research Laboratory, where she studies biofilms, antimicrobial resistance, periprosthetic joint infection and diagnostic testing of bacteria.

== Personal life ==
Born to a family of modest means in Winnipeg, Manitoba, Canada, Robin Patel and her family moved to the suburbs of Montreal, Québec, when she was four years old. Her parents are Barbara A. Foster and Nagin K. Patel, and she has two younger siblings, Janice E Patel and Harish DS Patel. She attended John Rennie High School following which she spent a year at Marianapolis College in Montreal and then matriculated to Princeton University in 1982.

Dr. Patel is married to Norbert Campeau, who is a radiologist also at the Mayo Clinic. They have two children, David and Michelle, both of whom attended Mayo High School and were named as top achievers.

== Education and career ==
Patel earned a BA degree in chemistry from Princeton University, graduating magna cum laude, Phi Beta Kappa, and Sigma Xi in 1985. She earned an MD from McGill University, graduating in 1989. At McGill University, she was supported by a Greville Smith scholarship and received several scholarly awards/prizes (Mr. and Mrs. J. A. Besner Prize, Mosby Scholarship Book Award, Newell W. Philpott Prize, Osler Medical Aid Foundation Bursary & Commonwealth Medical Elective Bursary and Elizabeth Ann Munro Gordon Prize).

She completed a residency in internal medicine at the Mayo Graduate School of Medicine, followed by fellowships in infectious diseases and clinical microbiology. She began working at the Mayo Clinic after the completion of her fellowships in 1996. In 2003, she received a Department of Medicine Laureate Award - Mayo Clinic, and in 2008 an Outstanding Woman in Medicine award from the Mayo Chapters of the AMSA & AMWA. In 2019, she delivered the Maxwell Finland Award Lecture at IDWeek (Washington, DC). In 2021, she was named a Distinguished Educator at Mayo Clinic. In 2022, she was the second woman ever to the Hamao Umezawa Memorial Award from the International Society for Antimicrobial Chemotherapy and was named Mayo Clinic's Distinguished Investigator.

Patel's scientific contributions includes authorship in over 540 peer-reviewed publications and over 20 book chapters. She has served as an editor for the Journal of Clinical Microbiology and Clinical Infectious Diseases (CID). She is also an advisor to the Clinical Laboratory Standards Institute (CLSI) Subcommittee on Antimicrobial Susceptibility Testing. She served as a member of National Institute of Allergy and Infectious Diseases Council, Division of Microbiology and Infectious Diseases Subcommittee (National Institutes of Health) from 2017-2021. She is serving as a member of the Scientific Advisory Board, Doherty Institute (Melbourne, Australia), a member of the Laboratory Workgroup, Advisory Committee to the Director of the CDC, a member, of the Planning Committee for the National Academies Workshop, Accelerating the Development & Uptake of Rapid Diagnostics to Address Antibiotic Resistance, and a member, of the Test Development and Advisory Committee, Medical Microbiology and Clinical Pathology for ABPath CertLink committee of the American Board of Pathology.

== Awards, honors, and memberships ==
- 2022 awardee of Hamao Umezawa Memorial Award (HUMA) from International Society of Antimicrobial Chemotherapy (ISAC)
- Mayo Clinic Distinguished Investigator Award, 2022
- Mayo Clinic Distinguished Educator Award, 2021
- ASM Special Recognition Award, 2021
- President of the American Society for Microbiology (ASM), 2019-2020
- Maxwell Finland Award, IDWeek (Washington, DC), 2019
- Elizabeth P. and Robert E. Allen Professor of Individualized Medicine, 2017 - present
- BD Award for Research in Clinical Microbiology, ASM, 2015
- Mayo Medical School Distinguished Service Award, 2015
- Outstanding Woman in Medicine - Mayo Chapters of the AMSA & AMWA, 2008
- Fellow, American Academy of Microbiology, 2012 - present
- Editor, Journal of Clinical Microbiology, 2009 - 2019
- Department of Medicine Laureate Award - Mayo Clinic, 2003
- Joseph E. Geraci Award for Infectious Diseases Outstanding Achievement - Mayo Clinic, 1995
- William H.J. Summerskill Award in Subspecialty Trainee Research - Mayo Clinic, 1995
