= Lyn March =

Rheumatologist

Lynette (Lyn) March AM is an Australian rheumatologist and clinical epidemiologist. She is Liggins Professor of Rheumatology and Musculoskeletal Epidemiology in the Faculty of Medicine and Health at the University of Sydney, Australia.

== Education and career ==
March graduated as a rheumatologist. She is a professor of rheumatology at the University of Sydney and the Kolling Institute, and head of the Department of Rheumatology at Royal North Shore Hospital.

== Medical research ==
March has worked on inflammatory arthritis, evidence based guidelines, and measuring the burden of musculoskeletal disorders. Her research interests include inflammatory arthritis clinical trials, patient reported outcomes, patient registries, biobanking (Australian Arthritis and Autoimmune Biobank Collective Principal Investigator), osteoporosis refracture prevention, burden of musculoskeletal disease; Global Musculoskeletal Health Alliance, and longitudinal rheumatoid arthritis studies.

== Awards and recognition ==
March was appointed as a member of the Order of Australia in the 2017 Australia Day Honours "(f)or significant service to medicine in the areas of rheumatology and clinical epidemiology, as an academic, researcher and clinician." In 2022, March received the Australian Rheumatology Association Distinguished Service Medal. In 2023, March received the Asia Pacific League of Associations for Rheumatology (APLAR) Master Award.

== Works ==
Australian Acute Musculoskeletal Pain Guidelines Group (2004). Evidence-based management of acute musculoskeletal pain: a guide for clinicians.
