= David Suarez (virologist) =

American virologist and immunologist

David L. Suarez
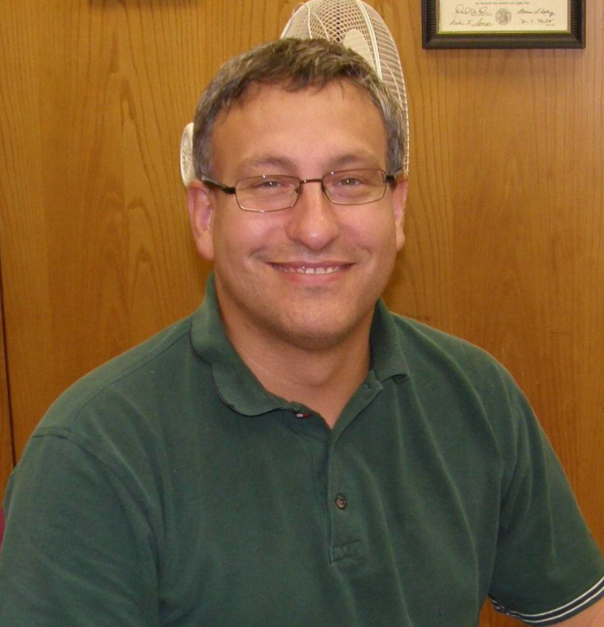
- Born: December 3, 1964 (age 61); Albuquerque, New Mexico
- Education: Auburn University; Iowa State University
- Spouse: Leslie Suarez (m. 1989)

David Lee Suarez (born 1964) is an American virologist and immunologist.

Suarez obtained a degree in veterinary medicine in 1988 from Auburn University. He obtained his PhD from Iowa State University in veterinary microbiology in 1995. He is board certified in the American College of Veterinary Microbiology in both virology and immunology. From 1988 to 1991, he worked as an associate veterinarian at Quintard Veterinary Hospital in Anniston. He remains a licensed veterinarian in the state of Iowa. He was a post-doctoral research associate at the Plum Island Animal Disease Center, New York. He joined the Southeast Poultry Research Laboratory, Agriculture Research Service, USDA, in 1995 as a veterinary medical officer.

Suarez is most widely cited for his involvement in creating a real-time reverse transcriptase PCR (RRT-PCR) assay based on the avian influenza virus matrix gene for the rapid detection of type A influenza virus and a RRT-PCR test for Newcastle disease virus in birds. Both assays were widely adopted nationally and internationally, and have been a critical tool for the control of outbreaks of these viruses in the United States. Since 2005, Suarez has been the research leader of the Exotic and Emerging Avian Viral Disease Research Unit at the Southeast Poultry Research Lab (SEPRL) in Athens, Georgia. Since 1996, he has held the position of adjunct instructor in the Department of Infectious Diseases, University of Georgia.

== Publications ==
His most cited publications are:

- Spackman E, Senne DA, Myers TJ, Bulaga LL, Garber LP, Perdue ML, Lohman K, Daum LT, Suarez DL. "Development of a real-time reverse transcriptase PCR assay for type A influenza virus and the avian H5 and H7 hemagglutinin subtypes". Journal of Clinical Microbiology. 2002 September 1; 40 (9): 3256-60. According to Google Scholar, this article has been cited 1628 times as of August 3, 2020.
- Suarez DL, Perdue ML, Cox N, Rowe T, Bender C, Huang J, Swayne DE. "Comparisons of highly virulent H5N1 influenza A viruses isolated from humans and chickens from Hong Kong". Journal of Virology. 1998 August 1; 72 (8): 6678-88. According to Google Scholar, this article has been cited 472 times as of August 3, 2020.
- Lee CW, Senne DA, Suarez DL. "Effect of vaccine use in the evolution of Mexican lineage H5N2 avian influenza virus". Journal of Virology. 2004 August 1; 78 (15): 8372-81. According to Google Scholar, this article has been cited 435 times as of August 3, 2020.
- Suarez DL, Senne DA, Banks J, Brown IH, Essen SC, Lee CW, Manvell RJ, Mathieu-Benson C, Moreno V, Pedersen JC, Panigrahy B. "Recombination resulting in virulence shift in avian influenza outbreak, Chile". Emerging Infectious Diseases. 2004 April; 10 (4): 693. According to Google Scholar, this article has been cited 617 times as of August 3, 2020.
