= David Brill (cinematographer) =

Australian cinematographer and journalist

David Brill AM (born 1944) is an Australian cinematographer and journalist.

In 1966 Brill joined the Australian Broadcasting Commission in Hobart as a cameraman, and the following year was sent to cover the 1967 Tasmanian fires. His work earned Visnews' award of Cameraman of the Month.

He accompanied Mike Willesee on an assignment to Vietnam and Cambodia for Four Corners in the early 1970s. He returned to Saigon for the evacuation of Australian personnel and was one of the last passengers on the last RAAF plane out of South Vietnam after the Fall of Saigon. He returned to Asia as a freelancer in the 1990s, based in Hong Kong.

He did much work for the SBS program Dateline in the period 2006–2016. He was twice awarded a United Nations Media Peace Award — for his work on SBS documentaries Good Morning Vietnam and Chad – Crisis in The Desert.

In the mid-1960s Brill and Peter Donnelly joined the Australian Cinematographers Society (ACS), founding the Tasmanian branch of the society. In 2008, he was inducted into the ACS Hall of Fame.

He was made a Member of the Order of Australia in the 2017 Australia Day Honours for his contribution to the broadcast media and service to the community of Tasmania.

An interview with Phillip Adams, broadcast on Radio National Late Night Live on 16 June 2003, is available as podcast.

He was the subject of the book The Man Who Saw Too Much: David Brill, Combat Cameraman by John Little; Hachette Australia (2010) ISBN 978-0733627477

He was the subject of a documentary film David Brill's Story On the Frontlines (2021), available to watch via Freeview.
