= Bernard Salt =

Australian demographer

Bernard Salt AM
- Occupations: Author; Demographer; Columnist
- Years active: 2001–present
- Employers: The Australian; Herald Sun; KPMG; Tourism Australia
- Website: bernard-salt.com.au

Bernard Salt AM is an author, demographer, and since 2002 a regular columnist with The Australian newspaper. Between 2011 and 2019 he was an adjunct professor at Curtin University Business School, and holds a Master of Arts from Monash University.

A column in the Weekend Australian in 2016 earned him international reputation for supposedly blaming discretionary spending on brunch food as a factor behind declining home ownership among millennials. The column created a furore on social media, and sparked further debate on intergenerational housing affordability in Australia. The phrase "smashed avo" has since become a recurring meme in Australia, and has been repeated overseas.

Salt is known for characterising dividing lines of the middle class, coining the terms "Goat's Cheese Curtain" and "Latte Line" to comment on gentrification in Australia's major cities.

Salt was awarded the Member of the Order of Australia (AM) in the 2017 Australia Day Honours. He was a partner of KPMG until his retirement in June 2017, and still acts as a special advisor to the firm.

== Books ==
- The Big Shift (2001)
- The Big Picture (2006)
- Man Drought (2008)
- The Big Tilt (2011)
- Decent Obsessions (2013)
