= MaryAnn Bin-Sallik =

Djaru elder and Australian academic (1940–2026)

MaryAnn Bin-Sallik AO
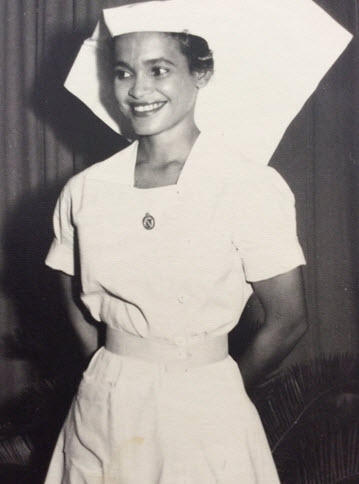
- Bin-Sallik in 1962
- Born: 2 November 1940; Broome, Western Australia, Australia
- Died: 21 February 2026 (aged 85)
- Education: Harvard University

MaryAnn Bin-Sallik AO (2 November 1940 – 21 February 2026) was an Australian academic and Djaru elder who specialised in indigenous studies and culture. She was the first Indigenous Australian to gain a doctorate from Harvard University.

== Early life and nursing ==
Bin-Sallik was born in Broome, Western Australia, on 2 November 1940. She moved with her family to Darwin, Northern Territory, at age nine. On leaving school she trained as a nursing sister at Darwin Hospital, where she was the first Indigenous person to graduate in 1961. She then spent 17 years nursing in Aboriginal settlements in the Northern Territory.

== Academic career ==
In 1975 Bin-Sallik was appointed student councillor to the Aboriginal Task Force (ATF) Program at South Australian Institute of Technology, Adelaide South Australia; becoming the first Indigenous Australian to work in the higher education sector. In 1979 she also completed an associate diploma of social work whilst working as student councillor. She then became coordinator of the ATF from 1980 to 1985. In 1985 she left to study at Harvard University, where she completed both a master's degree in education administration (1986) and a doctorate in teaching and learning (1989).

Returning to Australia, she became senior lecturer in Aboriginal studies at South Australian College of Advanced Education from 1989 to 1990. Bin-Sallik was then made head of the school, Aboriginal studies and teacher education at the University of South Australia in 1990. Eight years later she became its dean of the College of Indigenous Education and Research.

Bin-Sallik delivered the 8th Frank Archibald Memorial Lecture on "Aborigines and Universities: Are They Compatible?" at the University of New England in 1993.

In 2001 she returned to live in the Northern Territory and was appointed Ranger Chair and dean of faculty of the Faculty of Aboriginal and Torres Strait Islander Studies at Charles Darwin University. She retired in 2008 and was awarded the title emeritus professor "for services to Indigenous Higher Education in Australia".

In retirement, Bin-Sallik became chair of the Vice Chancellor's Indigenous Advisory Council at Charles Darwin University from 2013 to 2015. She was appointed pro vice-chancellor, Aboriginal and Torres Strait Islander Leadership at the University of Western Sydney in 2015 and was a member of its board of trustees from 2016.

In March 2016 Bin-Sallik was appointed a non-executive director of Aboriginal Hostels Limited, a not-for-profit organisation which provides temporary accommodation to Aboriginal and Torres Strait Islander people who are away from home. She also served as co-commissioner of the Australian Human Rights Commission's Enquiry into the Forced Removal of Aboriginal and Torres Strait Islander Children.

== Death ==
Bin-Sallik died on 21 February 2026, at the age of 85.

== Awards and recognition ==
- Victorian Honour Roll of Women, 2001
- Female Elder of the Year, NAIDOC Awards, 2016
- Officer of the Order of Australia (AO) in the 2017 Australia Day Honours "For distinguished service to tertiary education as an academic, author and administrator, particularly in the area of Indigenous studies and culture, and as a role model and mentor"
- Honorary Doctor of the University (DUniv), University of South Australia, conferred 29 March 2017 "in recognition of her distinguished service to the community"
- In October 2017, the University of Wollongong announced Marcelle Skimmings and Jacob Stephenson as winners of the inaugural MaryAnn Bin-Sallik Cancer Council NSW Indigenous Health scholarship. The scholarship was set up by the Woolyungah Indigenous Centre at the University and Cancer Council NSW to support Aboriginal and Torres Strait Islander students studying for medical careers. Its name recognises Bin-Sallik's achievements in health and academia.

== Works ==
- Bin-Sallik, Mary Ann (1990), Aboriginal Tertiary Education in Australia: How Well Is It Serving the Needs of Aborigines?, Aboriginal Studies Key Centre, University of South Australia, ISBN 978-0-86803-037-1
- Bin-Sallik, Mary Ann (2000), Aboriginal Women by Degrees: Their Stories of the Journey Towards Academic Achievement, University of Queensland Press, ISBN 978-0-7022-3147-6
