= Donald Hector =

Donald Hector AM
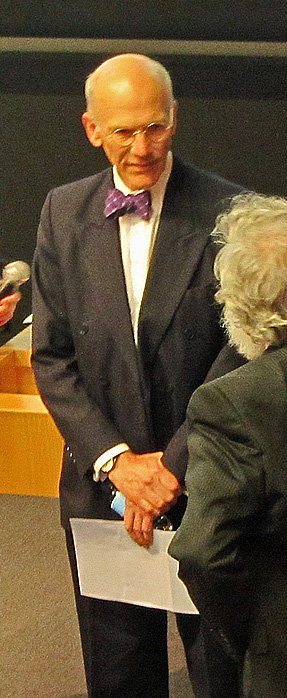
- Education: Newington College; University of Sydney
- Occupation: Company Director

Donald Hector AM is an Australian chemical engineer and company director. He has been managing director of ASX-listed and privately owned companies. He has a degree in chemical engineering and a PhD in engineering from the University of Sydney.

He has served on the boards of ASX-listed and privately owned companies and Newington College, and on advisory councils at the University of Sydney, the University of New South Wales, and various professional and business organisations. From 2012, he served four years as President of the Royal Society of New South Wales, the oldest learned institution in the Southern Hemisphere, previously having been editor of its peer-reviewed journal.

== Honours ==
- 2017: Member of the Order of Australia for significant service to science in the field of chemical engineering, and to business.
