= John Hamilton Bowie =

Australian scientist and academic

- Born: July 16, 1938
- Education: University of Melbourne; University of Nottingham
- Scientific career
- Fields: mass spectrometry
- Workplaces: University of Adelaide

John Hamilton Bowie AM (born 16 July 1938) is an Australian scientist and academic, best known for his contributions to research in the fields of the chemistry of negative ions in the gas phase and of bio-active peptides in skin glands.

== Career and Research ==
Bowie was born as the only child of William Hamilton Bowie and Alice Maud Bowie (nee Boyce), educated in Melbourne, and graduated from the University of Melbourne where he obtained an MSc for his work on the colouring matters of Australian plants. In 1961 he started working with Alan Johnson obtained his PhD at the University of Nottingham on the structures of various antibiotics including streptolidine, viomycin, and rhodomycinone, where he came across mass spectrometry for the first time. He subsequently took up an ICI postdoctoral fellowship at the University of Cambridge under Lord Todd.

In 1966, he was appointed to a lectureship at the University of Adelaide, rising to become head of department. In 1968 he was awarded the Rennie Memorial Medal for his work on the rearrangement of positively charged organic molecules. In 1974 he was awarded the H. G. Smith Memorial Medal of the Royal Australian Chemical Institute and in 2001 the A.J. Birch medal. In 2006 he received the Thomson Medal. From 1989 to 1992 he was Pro-Vice-Chancellor of the university.

In 2017, Bowie was appointed a Member of the Order of Australia for significant service to science in the field of mass spectrometry, and to education as an academic, researcher and author.
