= Lyn Gilbert =

Australian microbiologist and infectious diseases researcher

Lyn Gilbert AO FAHMS
- Born: Gwendolyn Lesley Stewart-Murray; 1942 (age 83–84); Melbourne, Victoria, Australia
- Other name: Gwendolyn Lesley Gilbert
- Education: Camberwell High School; University of Melbourne; Monash University

Gwendolyn Lesley Gilbert (born 1942), better known as Lyn Gilbert, is an Australian microbiologist who specialises in the control and prevention of infectious diseases, including COVID-19.

== Early life and education ==
Gwendolyn Lesley Stewart-Murray was born in Melbourne in 1942. She was educated at Camberwell High School from 1954 to 1959 and was awarded dux of the school and won three scholarships for university. She graduated from the University of Melbourne in 1965 with an MBBS and returned to that university to complete her MD in 1991 with her thesis, "Infectious diseases in pregnancy and the newborn infant". In 2003 she graduated from Monash University with a master's degree in bioethics.

== Career ==
Gilbert lectured in microbiology at the University of Melbourne (1976–1978), before moving first to the Royal Women's Hospital (1979–1984) and then the Royal Children's Hospital (1984–1990), both in Melbourne. In 1991 she moved to Sydney to take up the position of Director of the Centre for Infectious Diseases and Microbiology at Westmead Hospital and clinical professor at the University of Sydney.

She served as chair of the Infection Control Expert Group, a national group convened to advise on COVID-19, from February 2020 to March 2021. She has also led reviews of COVID-19 outbreaks in aged care facilities and contributed to the Royal Commission into Aged Care Quality and Safety.

== Honours and recognition ==
The Australian Society for Microbiology inaugurated the annual Lyn Gilbert Award in her honour. The first winner was David Ellis.

In the 2017 Australia Day Honours she was appointed an Officer of the Order of Australia (AO) in recognition of her "distinguished service to medical research, particularly the study of infectious disease prevention and control, to tertiary education as an academic, and to public health policy". She was elected a Fellow of the Australian Academy of Health and Medical Sciences in 2023.
