= Mark Khangure =

Indian-born neuroradiologist

Makhan Singh (Mark) Khangure in an Indian-born radiologist and a pioneer in the field of neuroradiology. He trained in the United Kingdom and Australia, and has been based in Perth, Western Australia, since the 1970s.

== Biography ==
Khangure was born in India and moved to England at nine years old. He received an MBBS in 1971 from the University of Newcastle upon Tyne and achieved Membership of the Royal Colleges of Physicians of the United Kingdom in 1974. He began training in radiology in Newcastle in 1975, and continued his radiology training after migrating to Australia in 1976 at Royal Perth Hospital, receiving Fellowship of the Royal Australian and New Zealand College of Radiologists in 1980. From 1982, he was a consultant radiologist at Royal Perth Hospital and Sir Charles Gairdner Hospitals, where he held various roles including Director of MRI and Director of Interventional Neuroradiology. He resigned from Royal Perth Hospital in 2006. He has been a consultant radiologist at SKG Radiology in Perth since 2007.

Khangure is regarded as a pioneer of neuroradiology in Australia. In the mid-1990s, he performed some of the earliest endovascular coiling procedures, a technique for treating bleeding brain aneurysms without surgery, and conducted clinical trials at Royal Perth Hospital. He was appointed a Member of the Order of Australia (AM) in 2017.
