= Graeme Stevenson =

Australian wildlife artist and television presenter (1958–2022)

Graeme Stevenson OAM
- Born: 29 June 1958; New South Wales, Australia
- Died: 5 June 2022 (aged 63)
- Known for: Wildlife painting, illustration, television presenting
- Notable work: The Atlas of Parrots of the World (1991); Colour In Your Life
- Awards: Medal of the Order of Australia (2017)

Graeme John Stevenson OAM (29 June 1958 – 5 June 2022) was an Australian wildlife artist and television presenter. He provided the drawings for the reference work The Atlas of Parrots of the World (1991), and created and presented Colour In Your Life, a documentary series about artists that ran to more than 300 episodes. In 2017 he was awarded the Medal of the Order of Australia for service to the visual arts.

== Early life ==
Stevenson was born at Wagga Wagga, New South Wales, in 1958. He had no formal art training. He was educated at Tweed River High School and held his first exhibition in 1984. He later lived at Murwillumbah in northern New South Wales.

== Career ==
=== Painting and illustration ===
Stevenson worked in oils and acrylics and also as a watercolourist. His subjects were chiefly wildlife, particularly birds, and works offered at auctions include studies of cockatoos, parrots, rosellas and other animal subjects.

In 1988 he was commissioned to illustrate The Atlas of Parrots of the World by the zoological author David Alderton. Published by TFH Publications in 1991, the 544-page volume is illustrated throughout with Stevenson's drawings and appeared in six languages.

He was invited by the conservationist George Adamson to paint the lions in his care, and painted animal subjects in India and South Africa. His work has been featured in American art magazines. Three of his paintings are held in the collection of the former United States president Bill Clinton. In 2010 the Tweed Daily News described him as the only Australian artist to have appeared on an American television programme built around his own work and its sale, which it said reached an audience of 70 million a year. In 2014 he was preparing to stage an exhibition in Los Angeles.

In 2009 Stevenson painted a five-metre by two-metre canvas titled The Golden Mean, the largest work he had attempted, narrating the golden ratio as it recurs in nature. He began it at home and continued painting in public at the Escape Art Gallery in Murwillumbah, where it was shown from 29 November 2009 in a group exhibition with the Northern Rivers artists David Calrow, Frank Miles, Robert Todonai and Robert Pope. He described the work as "a surrealist take based around my view of where we are coming from as humans and where we are going".

In 2021 he donated his painting Hangin' Around, depicting a female orangutan and her young, to be auctioned in Malaysia to raise money for a minibus for a children's home in Kedah; The Star described him as a renowned Australian painter.

Stevenson said he worked in no single style, attributing this to the range of artists he met through his television work. His later pieces, inspired by visits to Hong Kong, were three-dimensional: he applied gold leaf and ceramics to the paintings and sealed them under an acrylic polymer to build up texture.

He held solo exhibitions at Elizabeth Bay House in Sydney and at Prouds Gallery, both in 1984, and at the Laguna Wildlife Gallery in the United States in 1988. He took part in group exhibitions at the Galloway Gallery in Brisbane in 1985 and 1988, Visions Gallery on the Gold Coast and the Hoisser Gallery in Brisbane in 1987, the Los Angeles Design Center in 1987, and Gallery Nino Tucci on the Gold Coast in 1988. By 1990 his work was held in institutional and private collections in the United Kingdom, Europe, the United States, Canada, New Zealand and Australia. His work has been offered at auction in Australia since 1988.

=== Colour In Your Life ===
Stevenson created and presented a documentary series titled Colour In Your Life, also broadcast as Put Some Colour In Your Life, in which artists are filmed making a work in their own studio. Each episode was built around Stevenson visiting an artist and discussing what inspired them; presenters overseas hosted some episodes, though he said most participating artists asked for him. Ahead of the first broadcast, Stevenson explained that the series was intended to take viewers into the studios of practicing professional artists in order to exhibit how they operated. He called it "a show that is run by artists for artists". Founded in Australia in 2009 and produced by Colour In Your Life Productions, the series ran to 301 episodes across twenty-two seasons and part of a twenty-third, and was made by five film crews.

The program was produced at Murwillumbah and by 2014 employed seven local staff. It first aired on the Brisbane station Briz TV in November 2010, with a national rollout planned for the following January. The first national series eventually screened in 2011, with the Tweed Daily News reporting that it had taken three years to reach air.

By June of 2014, more than 100 episodes were produced and a seventh series was in production. The program was then a weekly broadcast in Australia on the free-to-air channel 4ME, on the Aurora channel on Foxtel. In New Zealand, the program was on Sky, Cue TV Invercargill, Gisborne TV, Dunedin TV and North TV. At that time, Stevenson mentioned that the series had 300,000 viewers worldwide.

By 2013, Colour in Your Life it was being distributed to China, parts of Europe and the United States. It was reported to have had a European audience of more than 80 million, before being later viewed in more than 50 countries. According to the Tweed Daily News, the show was nominated for a Logie Award in 2012.

Prominent artists shown in the series include Ken Done, Margaret Gurney, Alison Hale, Anne Marie Graham, and the watercolourist Joseph Zbukvic.

Its production company also staged exhibitions, opening a gallery in Brisbane Street, Murwillumbah, in 2014.

By January 2017, the series had aired for six years and reached 200 episodes. In 2018, Stevenson produced Colour in Canberra, a version of the series devoted to artists in the Australian capital in which seven local painters took part. The project was funded through Tourism ACT after the chief minister, Andrew Barr, invited the agency to invest in it and was accompanied by an exhibition at Regatta Point in February.

By 2020, it had film crews in the United Kingdom as well as the United States and had covered more than 260 artists in ten years, with each episode in production for roughly one week at a time. It was by then distributed through Amazon and the Apple TV app and on a Chinese pay-television network. Stevenson said it was due to begin airing on a pay network, Binge TV, and in the United States, but travel restrictions during the COVID-19 pandemic halted filming.

Full episodes of the series are included in the Lunar Codex, a project that places digitised archives of art, literature and music on the Moon, within its Minerva collection. Stevenson said the documentaries were to be nickel-plated onto a hard drive able to withstand gamma radiation and placed in a time capsule on the lunar surface; a launch failure delayed the project.

== Recognition ==
In 2013, Stevenson founded the Paint Your Life Fund, a not-for-profit organization providing art therapy and creative relief to people in the community. The same year, he received an Arts and Cultural Achievement Award in the Tweed Shire Australia Day awards for his contribution to art in the region.

In the Australia Day 2017 Honours List, announced on 26 January 2017, Stevenson was awarded the Medal of the Order of Australia, with the citation "For service to the visual arts." The award was reported in the United States by the art magazine Fine Art Connoisseur.

== Death ==
Stevenson died on 5 June 2022. Eric Rhoads, publisher of PleinAir magazine, described him as "a dear friend and a true innovator".
