= Clinical and Vaccine Immunology =

- Discipline: Infectious disease
- Language: English
- Edited by: Marcela F. Pasetti

Publication details
- History: 1994–2017. Clinical and Vaccine Immunology began as Clinical and Diagnostic Laboratory Immunology and was published with this title through 2005 (Volumes 1-12).
- Publisher: American Society for Microbiology (United States)
- Frequency: Monthly
- Open access: Delayed
- Impact factor: 2.598 (2012)

Standard abbreviations
- ISO 4: Clin. Vaccine Immunol.

Indexing
- CODEN: CVILA6
- ISSN: 1556-6811 (print); 1556-679X (web)

Links
- Journal homepage; Access to the online only journal; Online archive

Clinical and Vaccine Immunology (CVI) was a peer-reviewed journal published by the American Society for Microbiology. CVI enhances our understanding of the immune response in health and disease by showcasing important clinically relevant research, including new animal models for human immunologic diseases, viral immunology, immunopathogenesis, and clinical laboratory immunology. In particular, the journal highlights important discoveries in immunization and vaccine research, such as the development and evaluation of vaccines, human and animal immune responses to vaccines, vaccine vectors, adjuvants and immunomodulators, quantitative assays of vaccine efficacy, and clinical trials. The journal publishes primary research articles, editorials, commentaries, minireviews, and case reports. Articles are freely accessible after six months (delayed open access). Through its "Global Outreach Program", free online access is available to qualified microbiologists in eligible developing countries.

== History ==
Clinical and Vaccine Immunology (CVI) was originally launched in 1994 as Clinical and Diagnostic Laboratory Immunology. Dr. Steven D. Douglas was the Founding Editor and served as Editor in Chief until 2004. The focus and intent of the journal was to serve the new ASM Division V, Clinical and Diagnostic Immunology. Douglas was succeeded by Dr. Susan F. Plaeger, CVI's Editor in Chief until 2013. Under Plaeger's leadership, and in response to ASM members' feedback, the journal expanded its scope to include the growing field of veterinary and human vaccines. In 2006, the ASM Publications Board approved the new name Clinical and Vaccine Immunology, to reflect the inclusion of vaccine research as well as clinical immunology. The reorganization allowed CVI to attract high-quality research papers in the areas of clinical immunology and vaccinology while maintaining its interest in laboratory immunology and diagnostics. Since then, the journal has enjoyed a sustained increase in citations and impact factor. Areas of interest for CVI include microbial immunology, clinical immunology and immune mechanisms (in health and disease), veterinary immunology, and all aspects of vaccine research: development and evaluation, adjuvants, immune modulators and antigen-delivery systems, vaccine implementation, and clinical trials. The journal serves ASM members and the broad research community with the high scientific and editorial standards of the ASM Journals and the society itself. It has been named a Rising Star among journals in the field of Immunology in Essential Science Indicators from Thomson Reuters for several months during 2010 and 2011. CVI's impact factor has increased steadily for the last five years.

=== Editors in Chief ===
The following individuals have been editor in chief of Clinical and Vaccine Immunology:

- 1994–2003: Steven D. Douglas
- 2004–June 2013: Susan F. Plaeger
- July 2013 – present: Marcela F. Pasetti

== Abstracting and indexing ==
The journal is abstracted and indexed in:

- AGRICOLA
- Biological Abstracts
- BIOSIS Previews
- Cambridge Scientific Abstracts
- Current Contents/Life Sciences
- MEDLINE
- Science Citation Index Expanded
- Summon
- Illustrata

According to the Journal Citation Reports, the journal has a 2012 impact factor of 2.598 and an Eigenfactor score of 0.01727.
