= Sue-Anne Wallace =

Australian pharmacist, philanthropist and curator

Sue-Anne Wallace AM (30 July 1946 – 4 March 2024) was an Australian philanthropist.

== Biography ==
Wallace originally trained as a pharmacist at the University of Sydney. She later studied humanities subjects and completed a doctorate in art history at the Australian National University.

From 2005 to 2009, Wallace served as the CEO of the Fundraising Institute Australia. During her tenure she developed a set of principles and standards for fundraising practice which aimed to raise the practice of charitable fundraising in Australia. In 2010 she was appointed chair of the Australian Council for International Development’s Code of Conduct Committee, and in 2015 she was appointed vice-president of the Humanitarian Quality Assurance Initiative. In 2015 she received a Churchill Scholarship and investigated international practice in self-regulation and complaints handling.

In 2017 she was made a Member of the Order of Australia for her services to the not-for-profit sector.

Wallace died on 4 March 2024.
