= Journal of Clinical Microbiology =

- Discipline: Microbiology
- Language: English
- Edited by: Alexander J. McAdam

Publication details
- History: 1975-present
- Publisher: American Society for Microbiology (United States)
- Frequency: Monthly
- Open access: Delayed, after 6 months
- Impact factor: 6.1 (2023)

Standard abbreviations
- ISO 4: J. Clin. Microbiol.

Indexing
- CODEN: JCMIDW
- ISSN: 0095-1137 (print); 1098-660X (web)
- OCLC no.: 01799460

Links
- Journal homepage; Online access; Online archive; PubMed Central archive

The Journal of Clinical Microbiology is a monthly medical journal published by the American Society for Microbiology. The journal was established in 1975. The editor-in-chief is Romney M. Humphries (Vanderbilt University Medical Center). It is a delayed open access journal. Full text content is available free after a six-month embargo.

== Abstracting and indexing ==
The journal is abstracted and indexed in:

- Biotechnology Citation Index
- CAB Abstracts
- Cambridge Scientific Abstracts
- Current Contents/Clinical Medicine
- Current Contents/Life Sciences
- Elsevier BIOBASE
- Embase
- Global Health
- Index Medicus/MEDLINE/PubMed/PubMed Central
- International Bibliography of Periodical Literature
- Science Citation Index
- Scopus
- Tropical Diseases Bulletin
- Zoological Record

According to the Journal Citation Reports, the journal has a 2023 impact factor of 6.1

== See also ==
- Clinical medicine
- Clinical research
- Medical microbiology
