= Footrot Flats Fun Park =

Amusement park in Auckland, New Zealand

- Footrot Flats Fun Park depicted in a television advertisement in the mid-to-late 1980s
- Interactive map of Footrot Flats Fun Park
- Location: Te Atatū Peninsula, West Auckland, New Zealand
- Coordinates: 36.845°S 174.654°E
- Opened: 1982
- Closed: 1989
- Owner: John St Clair Brown
- Area: 15.5 ha (38 acres)

Footrot Flats Fun Park was a theme park on Te Atatū Peninsula, West Auckland, New Zealand. Opening in 1982 as Leisureland, the park rebranded to be themed around the Murray Ball cartoon Footrot Flats in 1984. During the 1980s, it was the largest theme park in New Zealand. In its final year of operation, the park rebranded as Something Different Fun Park, before closing in 1989.

== History ==
The land where the park was opened was originally purchased by the Auckland Harbour Board in the 1950s, who intended to construct a new Auckland port at the location.

The park opened as Leisureland in 1982. After the popularity of the animated film Footrot Flats: The Dog's Tale (1986), the park's management secured a licensing deal with cartoonist Murray Ball, and rebranded as a Footrot Flats-themed location, where actors would walk around the park dressed as the characters from the cartoon. During the park's heyday, the Footrot Flats Fun Park competed with Rainbow's End, a theme park which still exists in Manukau, South Auckland.

In the late 1980s, the theme park came across financial difficulties, especially after the 1987 stock market crash. Diminishing returns, increasing cost of rent from the council, and a lack of public transport access to the park were all factors which led to the park's demise. In 1988, Safari Land, a theme park and zoo in Massey, closed and merged with the Footrot Flats Fun Park. This led Safari Land's animals, including lions, tigers and monkeys, to be rehoused at the site. In the same year, the park rebranded as the Something Different Fun Park, and stopped operating in early 1989. The park was formally closed by the Waitakere City Council in 1991.

In May 1992, the council relaunched the venture as Adventure Park West, featuring a wider range of attractions, such as a farm park, circus, botanical garden and children's zoo.

== Rides and attractions ==
A range of rides and attractions were a part of the fun park, including:

- BMX tracks
- Bumper boats
- Bungee jump tower, a short-lived attraction
- Cannonball Run, a major rollercoaster at the park which opened on Christmas Day 1985
- Driver's Town, often the main attraction to the park. Riders would sit written and verbal driver's tests to earn a park driver's license, which allowed them to drive on the attraction.
- Go-karts
- Gondola
- Helicopter trips
- Kayak rides
- Laser tag
- Mini-golf
- Paintball challenge
- Slide
- Train ride
- Video game arcade
- Zoo exhibits
