= Raupo (disambiguation) =

Raupo is a common name for Typha orientalis, a wetland plant.

Raupo may also refer to:

- Raupo, a fictional town in the Footrot Flats cartoon
- Raupo Press a small press in New Zealand previously known as Reed Publishing and now part of the Penguin Group.
- Raupo, an 1876 iron barque which sailed in New Zealand and was deliberately sunk in Lyttelton Harbour.
