= Kāpiti College =

New Zealand school

Kapiti College
- Māori: Te Kāreti o Kapiti
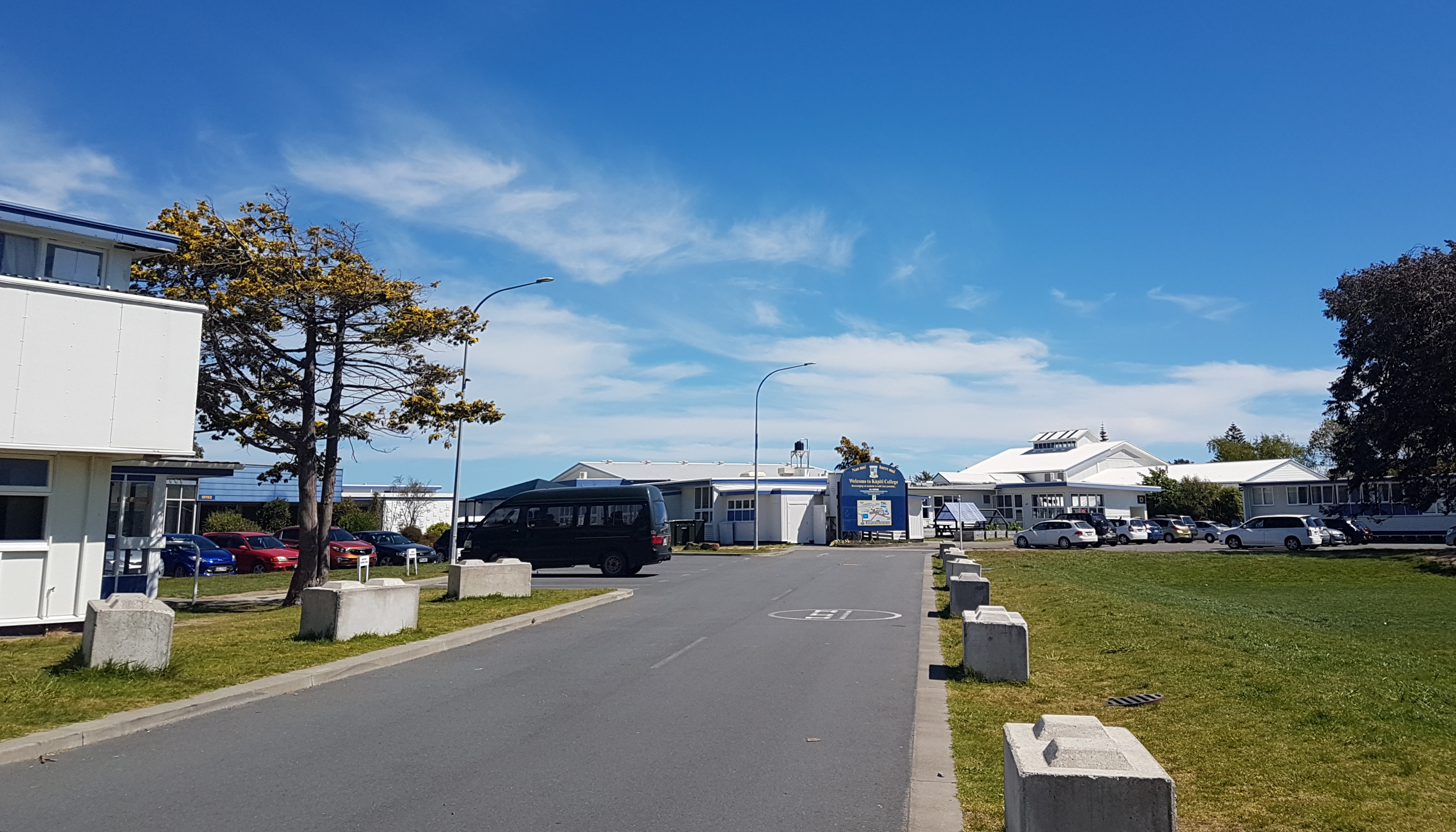

Location
- Margaret Road, Raumati Beach, New Zealand; 40°55′19″S 174°58′59″E

Information
- Type: Coeducational State Secondary (Year 9–13)
- Motto: Semper Fidelis
- Established: 1954
- Ministry of Education Institution no.: 247
- Principal: David Lowe
- Enrolment: 1,389 (July 2026)
- Socio-economic decile: 8P
- Website: www.kc.school.nz

Kapiti College is a secondary school situated at Raumati Beach on the Kāpiti Coast in New Zealand, 45 minutes drive from Wellington City. It was called Raumati District High School when built in 1954, then renamed Kapiti College in 1957. The Kapiti College motto is "Semper Fidelis" which translates to "Always Faithful".

The roll is 1,389 in July 2026, including international students. Numbers of students at the college increased by 400 in the 2003–2012 period.

== History ==
In October 1961, the school was officially opened by Lord Cobham.

In 1963 there was a dispute about whether the college's hockey team should play as a part of Horowhenua, or as a part of Wellington due to a boundary change.

In 1970, staff claimed that the college illegally deducted their salaries. A meeting was then held, with approximately one thousand teachers attending, closing the college for the meeting. Onslow College also closed to allow their teachers to attend the meeting. The teachers sent a telegram to the Ministry of Education.

== Enrolment ==
As of July 2026, Kāpiti College has a roll of 1,389 students, of which 222 (16.0%) identify as Māori.

As of 2026, the school has an Equity Index of 430, placing it amongst schools whose students have below average socioeconomic barriers to achievement (roughly equivalent to deciles 6 and 7 under the former socio-economic decile system).

== Facilities ==
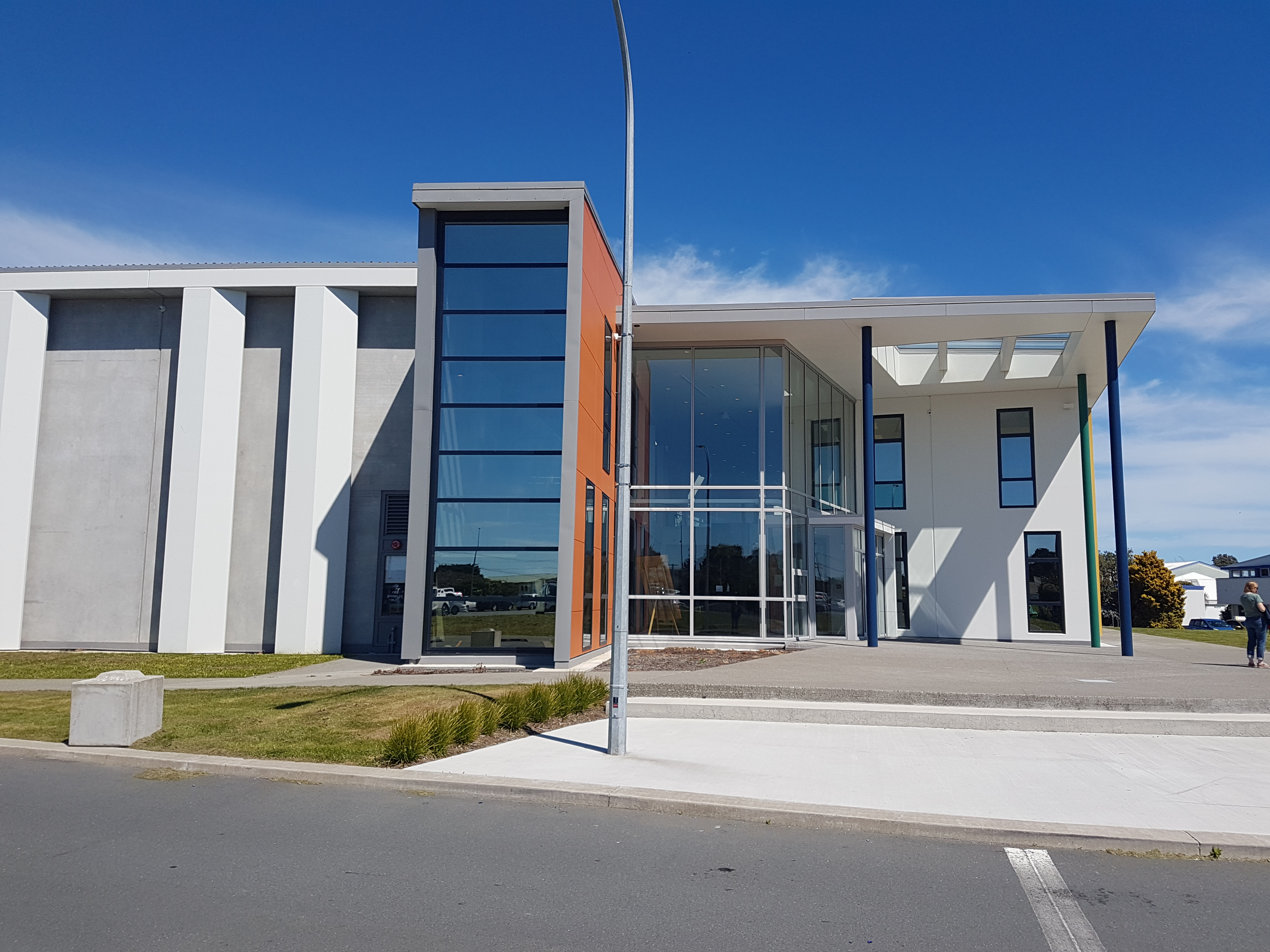
Te Raukura ki Kāpiti

The latest addition to the school is Te Raukura ki Kāpiti, a performing arts centre for use by the community and school which opened in February 2020. The facility was opened by Steven Joyce, a former student.

== Arts ==
The school has its own radio show on Wellington Access Radio.

== Notable alumni ==
- Christian Cullen, All Blacks player
- Peter Jackson, film maker
- Steven Joyce, government minister
- Mark Shaw, All Blacks player
- Blair Davenport, professional wrestler
- Sophie Handford, climate activist
