= John Barnett (producer) =

New Zealand film producer (1945–2025)

John Barnett CNZM
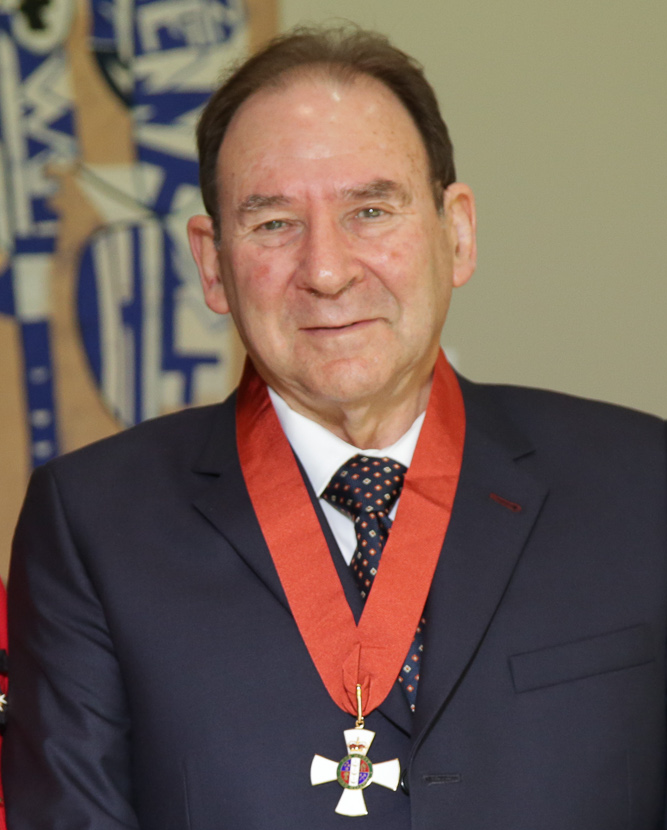
- Barnett in 2020
- Born: 17 August 1945; Auckland, New Zealand
- Died: 24 August 2025 (aged 80)
- Occupation: Producer
- Years active: 1970–2015; 2024
- Notable work: Whale Rider

John Daniel Barnett CNZM (17 August 1945 – 24 August 2025) was a New Zealand film and television producer. He is best known for producing the film Whale Rider (2002).

== Life and career ==
Barnett was born to a Jewish Family 17 August 1945 in Auckland, and studied at Victoria University of Wellington for a commerce degree. In 1970, he, with fellow graduates, invested in the first financial publication in New Zealand, the National Business Review (NBR). Barnett was an NBR director for several years. He spent years leading one of the most successful production companies in New Zealand, South Pacific Pictures. During his career, he produced a number of feature films, including Strange Behavior, Footrot Flats: The Dog's Tale, Whale Rider, and Sione's Wedding. He also worked as an executive producer for television series including Shortland Street.

Barnett died on 24 August 2025, at the age of 80.

== Honours and awards ==
In the 2003 Queen's Birthday Honours, Barnett was appointed an Officer of the New Zealand Order of Merit, for services to the film industry. He was promoted to Companion of the New Zealand Order of Merit, for services to film and television, in the 2020 New Year Honours.
