= Elizabeth Moody (actress) =

New Zealand actress

- Born: Elizabeth Bromley; 29 October 1939; Worthing, Sussex, England
- Died: 12 January 2010 (aged 70); Christchurch, New Zealand
- Occupations: Actress, director
- Spouse: Terence Moody

Elizabeth Moody (née Bromley, 29 October 1939 – 12 January 2010) was a New Zealand film, television and theatre actress and director.

== Career ==
Born in Worthing, Sussex, England, on 29 October 1939, Moody emigrated to New Zealand, becoming a naturalised New Zealander in 1957. She first came to note nationally in New Zealand during the late 1970s and early 1980s as a regular panellist on the television show Beauty and the Beast hosted by Selwyn Toogood. Her first feature film role was playing Mabel in The Scarecrow. She also played in The Fire-Raiser, Braindead, Turn of the Blade, and Heavenly Creatures. Her last film role was playing in Peter Jackson's The Lord of the Rings: The Fellowship of the Ring as the character Lobelia Sackville-Baggins.

== Death ==
Moody had been diagnosed with an abscess on the brain and stayed in the hospital for almost three weeks when she died from pneumonia on 12 January 2010. She is survived by her husband, Terence Moody, and other family members.

== Filmography ==
=== Feature films ===
- The Scarecrow – Mabel (1982)
- Braindead – Vera Cosgrove (1992)
- Turn of the Blade – Girl in Headshots and Auditions (1994)
- Heavenly Creatures – Miss Waller (1994)
- The Lord of the Rings: The Fellowship of the Ring - Lobelia Sackville-Baggins (2001) (Only Extended Version)
- Offensive Behaviour - Crystal (2004)
- Huhu Attack! - Aunty Maude (2010)

=== Television ===
- Beauty and the Beast (TVNZ): 1976–1985. Panellist
- Antiques for Love or Money (TVNZ): Panellist
- The Fire-Raiser (TVNZ): Mrs. Marwick (1986)
