= Jon Trimmer =

New Zealand ballet dancer (1939–2023)

Sir Jon Trimmer KNZM MBE
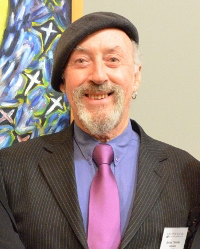
- Trimmer in 2013
- Born: Jon Charles Trimmer; 18 September 1939; Petone, New Zealand
- Died: 26 October 2023 (aged 84)
- Occupations: Ballet dancer; actor
- Employers: Sadler's Wells; Royal New Zealand Ballet
- Spouse: Jacqui Oswald (m. 1963)

Sir Jon Charles Trimmer KNZM MBE (18 September 1939 – 26 October 2023) was a New Zealand ballet dancer. He performed with the New Zealand Ballet Company in 1958 and 1959 before leaving New Zealand to study and perform in the United Kingdom. He and his wife, Jacqui Trimmer, also a ballet dancer, returned to dance in New Zealand over the years, as well as dancing in the Australian and Royal Danish Ballets.

== Early life ==
Trimmer was born on 18 September 1939 in Petone, New Zealand. He started learning ballet at age 12 at his sister's ballet school.

In 1958, he joined the New Zealand Ballet Company where he worked until he left to study overseas.

== Overseas experience ==
While overseas between 1959 and 1970 he:

- attended the Royal Ballet School from 1960 to 1961
- toured with the Sadler's Wells Ballet from 1962 to 1964
- danced with The Australian Ballet from 1965 to 1966
- danced with the Royal Danish Ballet from 1968 to 1969

Trimmer danced with Margot Fonteyn and Rudolf Nureyev.

== Dancing with the Royal New Zealand Ballet ==
In 1970 he returned to New Zealand to help revive the New Zealand Ballet and became the principal male dancer in that company. He was with the company, now known as the Royal New Zealand ballet, from then on.

Among the many roles he danced were Petrouchka and the role of Albrecht in Giselle.

In later years he danced character parts such as Captain Hook in Peter Pan.

== Other work ==
Trimmer played the part of Edgar Marwick in Peter Sharp's 1986 TV series The Fire-Raiser. Also in 1986, he appeared in the TV series Fireraiser and was nominated for the best actor award. In 2002 and 2003, he performed with Helen Moulder in her play Meeting Karpovsky.

Trimmer was patron of the Centastage theatrical company as well as the performing arts venue in Paraparaumu, Te Raukura ki Kāpiti. One of the performance spaces at Te Raukura ki Kāpiti is named after Trimmer.

== Honours and awards ==
At the 1971 Feltex Television Awards in February 1972, Trimmer won the performers' award for his dancing in the ballet Façade that was staged for television and broadcast by the NZBC in 1971.

In the 1974 New Year Honours, Trimmer was appointed a Member of the Order of the British Empire, for services to ballet. In 1982, he was awarded a Fulbright Cultural Grant. In 1991, he was presented with a Scroll of Honour from the Variety Artists Club of New Zealand for services to entertainment and dance.

In the 1999 Queen's Birthday Honours, Trimmer was appointed a Knight Companion of the New Zealand Order of Merit, for services to ballet. In 2009, Trimmer was named Wellingtonian of the Year.

== Personal life and death ==
Trimmer met his wife, Jacqui Oswald, when they both joined the New Zealand Ballet Company as dancers on the same day in 1958, and they married in 1963. In the 1988 Queen's Birthday Honours, Jacqui Trimmer was appointed a Member of the Order of the British Empire, for services to ballet.

On 26 October 2023, Trimmer died of cancer at the age of 84.
