= Sophie Handford =

New Zealand climate activist and politician

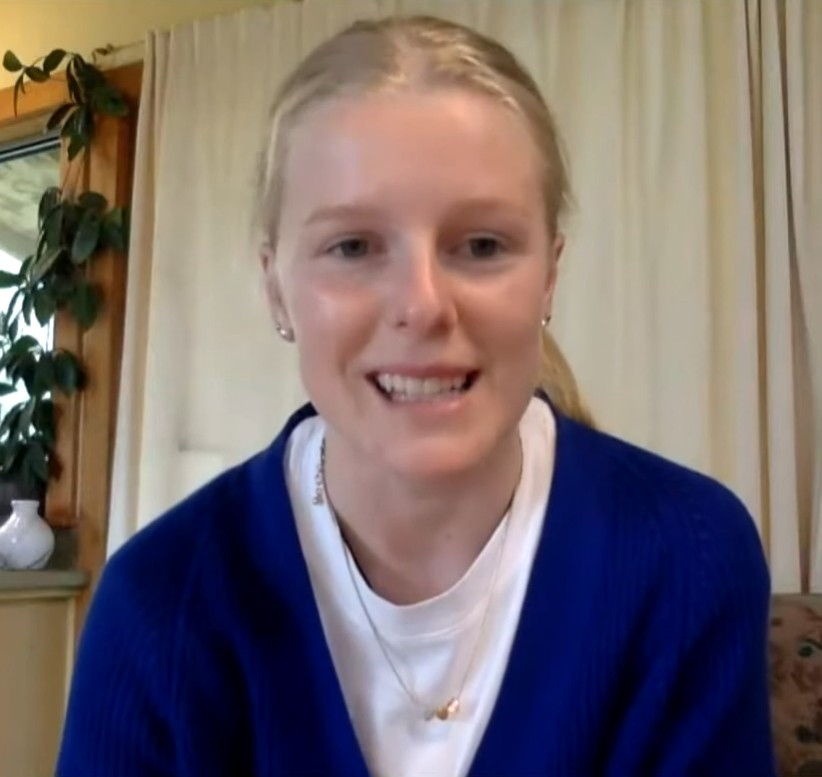
- Handford in 2020
- Born: 2000 or 2001 (age 25–26)
- Education: Kāpiti College
- Political party: Labour

Sophie Handford (born 2000 or 2001) is a New Zealand climate activist and politician. She founded and served as national coordinator of School Strike 4 Climate NZ and was a member of the Kapiti Coast District Council from 2019 to 2025, representing the Paekākāriki–Raumati ward.

In April 2025 she announced she would not seek re-election at the 2025 local elections.

== Early life and education ==
Handford grew up on the Kāpiti Coast and attended Kāpiti College, where she was head girl in 2018.

== Activism ==
In 2018–2019 Handford founded School Strike 4 Climate in New Zealand and became its national coordinator. Under her leadership the movement organised nationwide actions in 2019, including the 27 September mobilisation in which organisers and media reported an estimated 170,000 participants across more than 40 events nationwide.

She was selected as Youth MP for Kris Faafoi at the 2019 New Zealand Youth Parliament.

== International engagement ==
In 2020, Handford participated in the Ship for World Youth programme, a Japanese government-funded youth exchange and leadership initiative that brings together young leaders from around the world.

In November 2021 Handford was selected as one of four New Zealand delegates to APEC's Voices of the Future programme. The delegates presented their youth declaration to Prime Minister Jacinda Ardern during APEC Leaders' Week hosted by New Zealand.

In late 2023, Handford was awarded a Prime Minister's Scholarship for Asia, administered by Education New Zealand. The scholarship funded a two month sustainability internship in Tokyo, Japan, organised through CRCC Asia. She worked on integrating initiatives focused on decarbonising communities and systems.

== Political career ==
Handford was first elected to the Kāpiti Coast District Council in the 2019 local elections, winning the Paekākāriki–Raumati ward seat at age 18. She was re-elected in 2022. As of August 2025, she serves as Chair of the Strategy, Operations and Finance Committee and Deputy Chair of the Climate and Environment Subcommittee, with appointments to several community bodies including the Kāpiti Coast Youth Council. She has also served as a Zone 4 representative on the Local Government New Zealand (LGNZ) Young Elected Members Committee.

In April 2025 Handford stated she would not stand again at the 2025 New Zealand local elections. In November 2025, she was selected as the Labour Party's candidate for Kapiti in the 2026 New Zealand general election. Handford was ranked 26th on the Labour Party list. Based on preliminary results, Handford came second place to the incumbent National Party MP Tim Costley with 18,612 votes. Due to her low ranking on the Labour Party list, she was not re-elected to Parliament via the party vote.

== Awards ==
- The Post Wellingtonian of the Year: Supreme Award (2019 – joint recipient with Tahir Nawaz)
- New Zealand Youth Awards: Taiao – Commitment to the Environment Award (2019)
- Forest & Bird: Te Kaiārahi Rangatahi o te Taiao Youth Award (2020)
- GirlBoss Awards: Sustainability Award (2019)
- The Impact Awards: Winner, Climate category (2019)
