= Te Raukura ki Kāpiti =

Performing arts venue in Raumati Beach, New Zealand

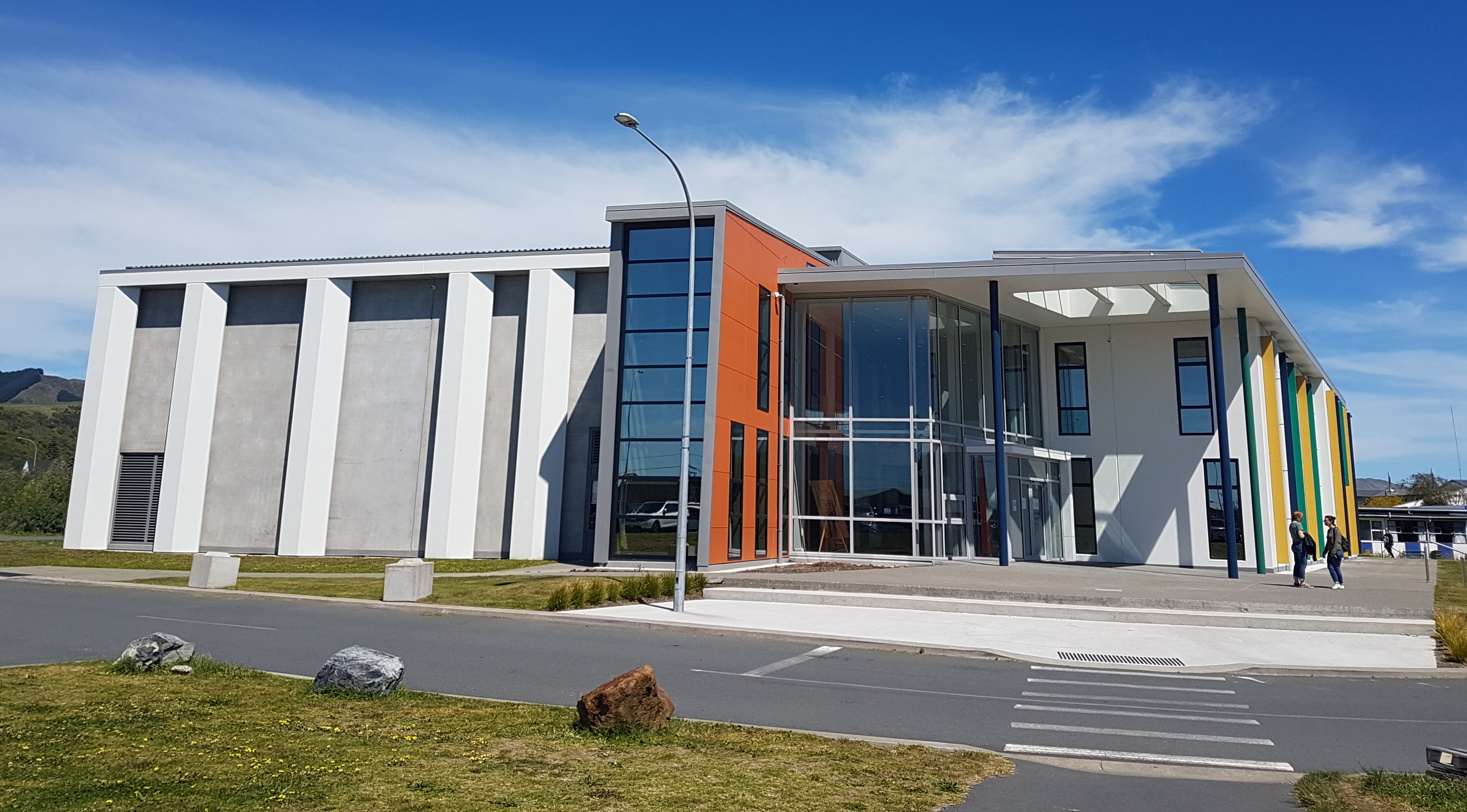
- Interactive map of the Te Raukura ki Kāpiti area

General information
- Type: Performing arts and theatre venue
- Location: 34a Raumati Road, Raumati Beach, Paraparaumu
- Coordinates: 40°55′15″S 174°59′03″E
- Opened: 22 February 2020

Design and construction
- Architect: McKenzie Higham Architects
- Civil engineer: Silvester Clark Consulting Engineers
- Main contractor: Multibuild

Website
- teraukura.nz

Te Raukura ki Kāpiti is a multi-purpose performing arts and theatre facility in Raumati Beach on the Kāpiti Coast in New Zealand. The facility was built as a partnership between Kāpiti College and the Kāpiti Coast community.

== History ==
The concept for a Kāpiti Performing Arts Centre on the grounds of Kāpiti College was first developed in 2013. The project to develop the facility was a partnership between the college and the Kāpiti community.

The facility was designed by McKenzie Higham Architects and the structural engineers Silvester Clark. It was built by the Kapiti-based construction company Multibuild. Site preparation for the construction of the new facility on the grounds of Kāpiti College began in November 2015. The project was funded with a $1.6 million grant from Kāpiti Coast District Council, Ministry of Education funding, Lotteries grants, Paraparaumu Rotary Club and community fundraising including seat sponsorship. The Coastlands shopping complex also provided funding via a naming rights sponsorship for the main venue.

An access agreement for the facility was signed in 2018 between Kāpiti College and the Kāpiti Coast District Council, setting out the community access to the facility. In November 2019, Sonia Hardie was appointed as the theatre manager for the Kāpiti Performing Arts Centre. On 5 February 2020, the Kāpiti College Board of Trustees announced that the black box theatre in the centre was to be named after Jon Trimmer, the renowned New Zealand dancer.

The name of the facility, Te Raukura ki Kāpiti was gifted by kaumātua from Parihaka in a dawn ceremony on 15 February 2020. The name Te Raukura means feather—symbolising peaceful co-existence. The official opening was held on 22 February 2020.

The opening season included a performance of Tutus on Tour by the Royal New Zealand Ballet on 29 February. However, the opening season was disrupted by closure of the venue in March because of restrictions associated with the COVID-19 pandemic. The venue opened again to the public in June.

== Venues ==
The facility includes multiple venues:

- The Coastlands Theatre is the main venue in the facility. It seats 331 and has a stage 12 m (39 ft) wide and 9 m (30 ft) with a proscenium arch and an orchestra pit. The theatre is equipped with full lighting facilities and a sound system. It also has a theatrical rigging system (or fly system).
- The Sir John Trimmer Theatre is a black box theatre with capacity for up to 200 people.
- The Dance Studio is a 13.5 m (44 ft) x 10.2 m (33 ft) space on the second level of the facility. It has a sprung floor, a mirror wall, and natural light.
- The Music Room is a second 13.5 m (44 ft) x 10.2 m (33 ft) space with choral risers providing standing accommodation for a choir of 80.
