= Tom Scott (cartoonist) =

New Zealand cartoonist

Tom Scott ONZM
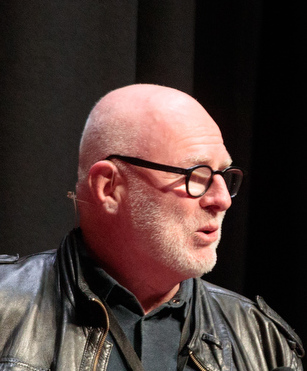
- Scott in 2018
- Born: Thomas Joseph Scott; 29 October 1947 (age 78); London, England
- Writing career
- Genres: Satire, Humour, Cartoon

Thomas Joseph Scott ONZM (born 1947) is a New Zealand cartoonist. In the 1990s, he won New Zealand Cartoonist of the Year six times, and won the award again in 2009.

== Biography ==
Scott was born in London, United Kingdom in 1947 and emigrated to New Zealand with his family as an 18-month-old. He was raised at Rongotea in rural Manawatu, and studied at Massey University, graduating with a Bachelor of Science in physiology in 1972.

Scott has been a regular cartoonist for most of his career; initially for the New Zealand Listener magazine, between 1984 and 1987 for the Auckland Star, and then for the Evening Post newspaper and its successor the Dominion Post.

As a satirist, newspaper columnist and cartoonist, Scott often provokes New Zealand politicians and at one stage was banned from the press contingent for a considerable period of time by Prime Minister (1975–1984) Robert Muldoon, which naturally resulted in continuing astringent expressions in the press by Scott. He later said of Muldoon: "I believe that much of the sourness, depression and division that currently besets our country can be laid at the feet of one man - Robert David Muldoon... he has made intolerance and prejudice, if not fashionable then at least permissible."

Scott has won numerous awards, including the Qantas Awards for New Zealand Cartoonist of the Year (seven times), Columnist of the Year, and Political Columnist of the Year (three times). He also won scriptwriting awards for Fallout and for View from the Top. Scott co-wrote the screenplay for the animated feature Footrot Flats: The Dog's Tale with Murray Ball. In 2001 Scott wrote the semi-autobiographical stage play, about his father, The Daylight Atheist which has since been performed by numerous theatres in New Zealand and Australia. He followed up his father's story with a play about his mother, Joan, in 2018.

In the 2006 New Year Honours, Scott was appointed an Officer of the New Zealand Order of Merit for services as a writer, journalist and illustrator.

In 2011, Scott produced the 1981 Springbok Tour TV drama Rage, shown as the final of four parts of the Sunday Theatre season on TV One on 4 September 2011. The series was a ratings winner.

In March 2019 Scott left the Dominion Post to pursue a project to write a biography of two-time Victoria Cross recipient Charles Upham, which was published in 2020. He rejoined the team of cartoonists at Stuff in February 2021 but published his last cartoon in the Dominion Post on 24 September 2022.

His son Samuel Flynn Scott is the frontman of rock band The Phoenix Foundation.

== Bibliography ==
- Tom Scott's Life and Times (1977)
- Overseizure : The Saga of a New Zealand Family Abroad (1978)
- Snakes and Leaders (1981)
- Ten Years Inside (1985)
- Private Parts : Lost Property from the Last 16 Years (1990)
- In a Jugular Vein : A Collection of Cartoons and Comments (1991)
- Drawn Out: A Seriously Funny Memoir (2018)
- Searching for Charlie: In Pursuit of the real Charles Upham VC and Bar (2020)
