= The Fire-Raiser =

1986 New Zealand television series

- Also known as: The Undercover Gang
- Written by: Maurice Gee
- Directed by: Peter Sharp
- Starring: Jon Trimmer; Peter Hayden; Miles Murphy; Alix Chapman; Darryl Beattie; Emma Vere-Jones
- Composer: Terry Gray
- Country of origin: New Zealand
- Original language: English
- No. of seasons: 1
- No. of episodes: 5

Production
- Producer: Ginette McDonald
- Editor: Paul Sutorius
- Running time: 25 minutes (102 minutes)

Original release
- Network: TVNZ 2
- Release: 24 August – 21 September 1986

The Fire-Raiser is a 1986 New Zealand television series. It was written by Maurice Gee and directed by Peter Sharp. Set in 1915 in the small town of Jessop it featured four children who suspect a local farmer of being an arsonist. The 5 episode series was later recut as a telemovie. The telemovie was further cut down and released with the title The Undercover Gang.

Dancer Jon Trimmer, who was playing the farmer Edgar Marwick, had his jaw broken during a fight scene. The jaw had to be wired shut for six weeks so the production team had work around that, using a mask and careful lighting to hid his minimal jaw movement.

The Fire-Raiser was based in part on historical events and people from Nelson that were detailed in Gee's non-fiction book Nelson Central School: A History, with the fictional town of Jessop standing in for Nelson.

== Cast ==
- Jon Trimmer as Edgar Marwick
- Elizabeth Moody as Mrs. Marwick
- Peter Hayden as Clippy Hedges
- Miles Murphy as Phil Miller
- Alix Chapman as Kitty Wix
- Darryl Beattie as Noel Wix
- Emma Vere-Jones as Irene Chalmers
- Donna Akersten as Frau Stauffel
- Anne Budd as Mrs. Bolton
- Gerald Bryan as Mr. Wix
- Jane Waddell as Mrs. Wix
- David Cameron as Mr. Chalmers
- Helen Moulder as Mrs. Chalmers
- Edward Campbell as Sergeant McCaa

== Episodes ==
1. The Red Balaclava
2. Chalmers Warehouse
3. Kitty Plays the Piano
4. Britannia Meets the Kaiser
5. The White Lady

== Awards ==
1987 GOFTA Awards

- Best Drama Series
- Best Children’s Programme: "The Red Balaclava" (episode one)
- Best Director: Peter Sharp
- Best Writer - Drama: Maurice Gee, for "The Red Balaclava"
