= Peter Hayden =

New Zealand actor, television series writer, producer and presenter

Peter Hayden MNZM
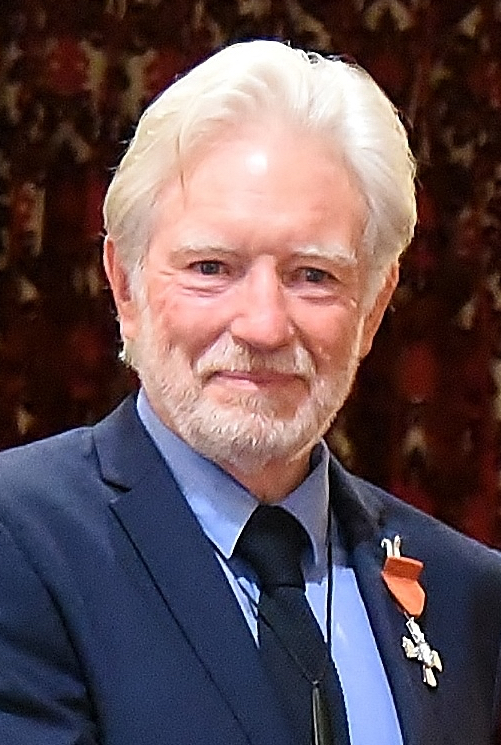
- Born: 1948 or 1949 (age 77–78)
- Occupations: Actor, presenter and writer
- Known for: Nature documentaries

Peter John Hayden MNZM (born 1948/49) is a New Zealand actor, and television series writer, producer and presenter. Hayden is known to New Zealand audiences as the writer and narrator of nature documentaries series including Wild South and Journeys Across Latitude 45.

== Early life ==
Hayden grew up in Napier, and attended Marist Primary School and St John’s College. He obtained a Bachelor of Science degree from Massey University in 1972.

In 1973, Hayden graduated from the QE II Arts Council Drama School, and was an apprentice actor at Downstage Theatre for two years. He worked as a reporter/ director for TVNZ at Avalon Studios, Lower Hutt, on the programmes Today at One and Country Calendar.

== Documentaries ==
Hayden joined the television production company Natural History New Zealand (subsequently NHNZ) in 1980. He is widely known for his work over the following three decades on writing, producing and presenting television documentaries. His most significant work with NHNZ includes:

- writing and hosting the Wild South series
- writing and co-hosting the Wildtrack series for children
- writing and presenting the series Journeys across Latitude 45 (1985)
- writing and presenting the series Journeys in National Parks (1987)
- producing and directing the series Moa's Ark (1990) with well-known presenter David Bellamy

Between 1997 and 2008, Hayden worked as Executive Producer and Head of Development. He was the supervising producer of a series on evolution, Life Force, between 2008 and 2011. Hayden's work as a producer for NHNZ included the 13-part series Buggin' with Ruud featuring entomologist and broadcaster Ruud Kleinpaste.

Hayden left NHNZ in 2012 to focus on his career in the performing arts.

== Film and television drama ==
Hayden has appeared in film and television dramas including Kid Sister (2021), the Maurice Gee television serial The Fire-Raiser (1986), Arriving Tuesday (1986), Illustrious Energy (1988), Footrot Flats: The Dog's Tale (1986), and Beyond Reasonable Doubt (1980).

== Career in theatre ==
Hayden has acted in theatre productions in Dunedin, Wellington and Auckland including performances of: The Sea, Oh Temperance, Marat/Sade, Tales from Hollywood, The Importance of Being Earnest, A Doll's House, Glorious Ruins, Oleanna, Horseplay, The Daylight Atheist, Leah, The Raft, Lysistrata, The Vertical Hour, The Curious Incident of the Dog in the Night-Time, A Short Cut To Happiness, The Motel, Other Desert Cities, Trees Beneath the Lake, Time Stands Still, Ladykillers, You Can Always Hand Them Back, Under the Mountain, and Winding Up.

== Honours and awards ==
In the 2017 Queen’s Birthday Honours, Hayden was appointed a Member of the New Zealand Order of Merit, for services to film and television. Other awards include:

- 1982, 1983, 1984 Feltex Awards: Best Children's Programme: Wildtrack
- 1986 National Mutual GOFTA Awards: Best Non-Drama Script: Peter Hayden for Journeys Across Latitude 45 South, episode 2, A Little Continental
- 1988 Listener Film and Television Awards: Best Writer, Non-Drama (Peter Hayden) for Journeys in National Parks
- 1988 NZ Film and TV Awards: Best Supporting Male Performance (Peter Hayden) for Illustrious Energy
