= Footrot Flats =

Comic strip by New Zealand cartoonist Murray Ball

- The first edition of the book Footrot Flats, released in 1978
- Author: Murray Ball
- Launch date: 16 February 1976
- End date: April 1994
- Genre(s): Humour, Gag-a-day

Footrot Flats is a comic strip by New Zealand cartoonist Murray Ball that ran from 16 February 1976 to April 1994 in newspapers (unpublished strips continued to appear in book form until 2000). Altogether there are 27 numbered books (collecting the newspaper strips, with additional material), a further 8 books collecting the Sunday newspaper strips, and 5 smaller "pocket" books of original material, plus various related publications. The strips inspired a stage musical, an animated feature film called Footrot Flats: the Dog's ~~Tail~~ Tale, and the Footrot Flats Fun Park in Auckland, New Zealand. The strip reached its peak of popularity in the mid-1980s, with the books selling millions of copies in Australasia.

The comic's protagonist is a border-collie sheepdog known as "the Dog", owned by Wal Footrot, who runs a sheep and cattle farm called Footrot Flats near the fictional rural town of Raupo in New Zealand. The comic depicts the trials and tribulations of Wal, the Dog and other characters, human and animal, which they encounter. The Dog's thoughts are voiced in thought bubbles, though he is clearly "just a dog", unlike the heavily anthropomorphised creatures of some other comics or animation. The humour draws on the foibles of the characters, which many farmers found easy to recognise around them. There was much "humour in adversity", making fun of the daily struggle that permeates farming life. The depictions of the animals are quite realistic and detailed, with a dose of comic anthropomorphism superimposed without spoiling the farming realism.

== History ==
Footrot Flats was initially rejected for syndication by both The New Zealand Herald and The Auckland Star. It was first accepted in 1976 by Mike Robson, editor of Wellington's The Evening Post. The strip appeared in hundreds of newspapers in Australasia and also gained an international following, especially in Denmark.

The strip's leading human character, Wal Footrot, is based on Murray Ball's cousin Arthur Waugh, who was a sheep shearer around the time of the strip's inception and went on to own a 2,100-hectare farm situated east of Pahiatua in the southeastern North Island of New Zealand.

Ball cited different reasons for quitting the strip, including the death of his own dog, and his displeasure with the direction of New Zealand politics.

Among the strip's fans were Peanuts creator Charles Schulz and Garfield creator Jim Davis.

The Gisborne Museum & Arts Centre created an exhibition for Footrot Flats, which was exhibited at the Auckland War Memorial Museum in September 1991.

A statue of Wal and the Dog created by Wētā Workshop was installed in Gisborne in 2016. It was initially placed in front of the Lawson Field Theatre before being installed in front of the H. B. Williams Memorial Library. The concept for the sculpture arose from discussions between Murray and Pam Ball and Gisborne Mayor Meng Foon in 2009.

In the Australian TV series, Bluey, the character Mackenzie is a reference to the comic series. This is evident from him being a Border Collie and having a distinct Kiwi accent.

== Main characters ==
A scene from a 1978 strip - showing Wal and The Dog

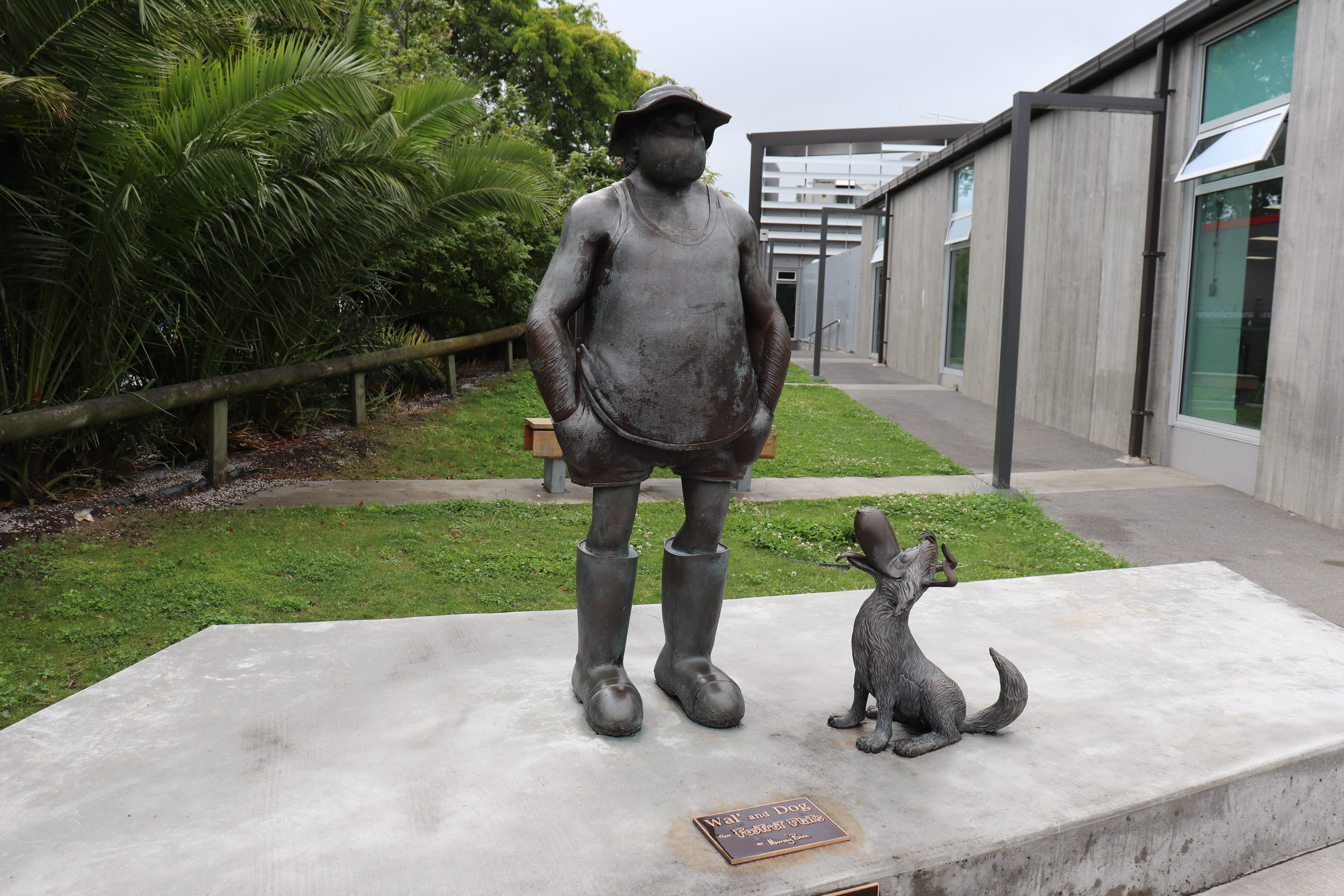
Sculpture of Wal and Dog in Gisborne, New Zealand

"The Dog"
The main character of the series, a Border Collie, he considers himself tough and brave, but is quite soft and sometimes cowardly. His real name, chosen by Wal's Aunt Dolly, has never been revealed. He despises this "refined, aristocratic name" and goes to great lengths to censor it. Wal always calls him "Dog", gaining his loyal devotion. The Dog was born on October 13 at Aunt Dolly's holiday home for cats and raised by a Persian cat named Ninky Poo—which caused him, when he was a pup, to act more like a cat than a dog—before being given to Wal, who raised him to act more like a normal dog. He is a competent sheepdog and is often put to work to guard things or get rid of rats or pigs, but has a considerable independent streak. He is fond of rabbits, afraid of hares and dislikes seeing trees being cut down. He has several alter egos: "The Scarlet Manuka" who attempts to 'liberate' cricket balls, "Mitey Iron Paw", and "the Grey Ghost of The Forest". The Dog has claimed to have the following commendations: V.C. (Very Cute), D.S.O. (Doesn't Steal Offal), and B.A.R (What Sheep Do), along with the alias of '00Dog' (Licensed to be kind but fair). He usually attempts to act as a 'chaperone' on Wal's dates with "Cheeky" Hobson, leading to disaster for Wal.

Wallace Cadwallader "Wal" Footrot
Wallace Footrot was born on 26 January in Northern Manawatu. He was educated at Apiti Primary School and later Foxton Agricultural High, where he excelled at tractor reversing and rooster imitations. Wallace established an outstanding relationship with muscovy ducks, but unfortunately failed completely with geese. Indeed, he seemed to have an uncanny knack of irritating them. Wallace took a full part in all school activities. He displayed a promising right cross during his time in the front row of the 2nd XV, but was unable to transfer this ability to the boxing ring. He rather let the side down during the inter-school championships by throwing in the sponge, which knocked the referee's glasses crooked. He was disqualified. On leaving school, he acquired 400 acres (160 ha) of swamp between the Ureweras and the sea. He is unmarried, although he has an interest in Darlene "Cheeky" Hobson, who works as a hairdresser in Raupo. Wal plays rugby union for Raupo, where he is a hooker and dreams of representing New Zealand's national team, the All Blacks. The Raupo XV often play against the Mill team, whose star player is Wal's sleazy neighbour, 'Spit' Murphy, who also competes for Cheeky's affections.

Socrates "Cooch" Windgrass
Wal's neighbour and best friend. Cooch has compassion for all living creatures and nature, and thus has a natural affinity with animals. But he is no vegetarian. His family owns 1,000 acres of swamp, tussock, scrub, forest and mudflat. A cabbage tree grows through his verandah floor, while a pūriri tree has pushed his house crooked. Cooch owns the Dog's girlfriend Jess and a pet magpie called Pew. Cooch never drives a tractor, preferring to plod along on his Clydesdales. He helps Wal with fencing, shearing and other farm jobs. He is unmarried but has a crush on his cousin Kathy. Murray Ball describes Cooch as 'eccentric, NOT an idiot!', having based the character on two people he knows.

Dolores Monrovia Godwit "Aunt Dolly" Footrot
Wal's aunt (by marriage). She was born in Cambridge, Waikato, and was the second daughter of Englishman Edward George Bogg and New Zealander Fiona Godwit Symington. She was educated at Lady Hinema Sacks-Grenville School for Young Ladies and was a prefect, captain of hockey, lacrosse, and boxing. She married beneath her station to Arch' "Toey" Footrot, a barber and unlicensed bookie, who was Wal's father's older brother. Unfortunately, Toey ran off to Australia with "a dumb but decorative darts stall owner with masses of black hair". Aunt Dolly's first cat was Archibald II. She owns a cat home (where Dog was born) on Prince Phillip Drive in Tauranga. She is conservative, reveres the British monarchy, always addresses people by their proper names, and she disapproves of Wal's relationship with Cheeky Hobson. Beneath her strictness she has a kind heart and takes to mothering abandoned lambs in the winter. Dog despises her for giving him his name.

Darlene "Cheeky" Hobson
Wal's girlfriend. She is the proprietor of La Parisienne Hairdressing Salon in Raupo. Cheeky is despised by the Dog, who is always looking for ways to come between her and Wal. She has two younger sisters, Belinda (Book 10) and Avril (Books 14 and 24), also both disliked by the Dog. Near the end of the strip's run, Cheeky and Wal become engaged, much to the dismay of the Dog and Aunt Dolly, but at the last minute Cheeky dumps Wal to move to Los Angeles with a male stripper. She is first mentioned in Wal's mini biography at the start of Book 1 (September 1978) but does not appear until Book 2 (August 1979).

Horse
A large, fierce and practically invulnerable tomcat, based on a cat that lived on Murray Ball's farm. He is a menace to the Dog and the other characters, resisting attempts to be tamed. He has a girlfriend (Fred, first mentioned in Book 9, first appears in Book 11) who has tattooed ears, lives with a biker gang and loves leather. He occasionally fathers kittens. Horse "spoke" infrequently in the earlier comics, but subsequently communicated via actions and yowls. Horse has saved the Dog and Jess from the local rat population at the Murphy farm. Book 7 is dedicated to the real Horse and begins with an elegy, followed by a eulogy penned by Murray Ball to commemorate the irascible cat's passing. First appearance: Book 2 (August 1979).

Janice "Pongo" Footrot
Wal's niece, daughter of Rex Footrot. She ages during the books. She starts off as a stereotypical little girl, dressing up the Dog, putting him in a pram and playing dolls; however, she slowly turns into a strong feminist. Despite being a "town" girl and attending boarding school, she is unafraid of wildlife and assists with mustering and other farm work. She insists her nickname Pongo derives from her ping pong skills, not because she ponged (stunk) as a baby. First appearance: Book 3 (July 1980).

Prince Charles
A very spoiled Welsh Corgi owned by Aunt Dolly. Has a higher view on life from listening to Aunt Dolly and living indoors. Often there are "class" clashes between him and Dog. He sometimes lusts after Jess but is even more fond of fine canine cuisine. In Book 12, he is asked to "service" a female corgi named Penelope Penrose IV, but fails to rise to the occasion, leaving Major to do the job at night. The Dog usually has to explain to Prince Charles the rougher aspects of farm life, like livestock mating and maggots eating mutton without gravy. Prince Charles is territorial when on his own turf. First appearance: Book 4 (April 1981).

Rangi Wiremu Waka Jones
A local Māori boy who often appears on the farm to give Wal a hand, he also plays with Pongo when she visits during holidays. Despite his short stature, he is a skilled rugby player, often getting the better of Wal. Rangi's father is an abattoir slaughterman and his mother teaches at Raupo School. In his first appearance, Rangi considers skinning the Dog to make a fur coat. As a testimony to Murray Ball's skill as an artist, the character of Rangi grew up over the years, appearing slightly older in each book from being a little kid to a teenager. First appearance: Book 4 (April 1981).

The characters are invariably known by their nicknames, such as Cooch, Pongo, Rangi, and Aunt Dolly. However, Aunt Dolly never uses the nicknames and always addresses them by their proper names.

== Minor characters ==
Jess
Cooch's dog. She is the Dog's girlfriend and co-parent. Despite frequently being confined to the "Bitch's Box" when "on heat", she has had several litters of puppies with the Dog. The Dog's ~~Tail~~ Tale contains the story of their meeting as puppies, although Jess's letter at the start of Book 5 gives a different account of the first time they saw each other. First appearance: Book 1 (September 1978).
Major
Wal's first dog. A pig-hunting dog, he is stern and tough. He has some fondness for Dog, saving him from the Murphys' dogs. First appearance: Book 1.
Cecil the Ram
An aged stud ram, who lacks zest for the task of servicing Wal's ewes. He soon rediscovers his libido when Wal sharpens the butchery knife. As the books progress, Cecil's appearance becomes increasingly decrepit. First appearance: Book 2 (August 1979).
Rex "Chicken" Footrot
Wal's younger brother and Pongo's father, he lives in town and is a potter. He has a young son named Mad Mick, who rarely visits the farm. Rex is better than Wal at just about every sport, much to Wal's annoyance. He owns Boobsie, the Dog's mum, and also owned Flash, the Dog's father, whose death was announced in Book 14. First appearance: Book 3 (July 1980).
Pew
Cooch's pet magpie. Orphaned when Wal cut down his parents' macrocarpa tree; socially confused and always seeking revenge on Wal. Wal gave Pew to Cooch as a birthday present - the first time Wal ever remembered it - to get rid of him, but Pew's revenge continues. Cooch became a surrogate mother for Pew, coaching him in the way of birds as best he can. In Book 14, Pew falls in love with and abducts Cheeky Hobson's pet budgerigar, Little Twinkle, which is then eaten by Horse. First appearance: Book 4 (April 1981).
Puti Puti
Rangi's cousin. A city slicker from Porirua, she often carries a boombox on her shoulder and invariably suffers culture shock when visiting the farm. In Book 25, she brings her pit bull terrier, Terror, to the farm. First appearance: Book 10 (September 1985).
Kathy
An occasional visitor to Cooch's farm. Her face remains a mystery, as she is almost always drawn facing away from the reader – except once in Book 27, when she is only partially obscured by Spit Murphy's arm. Kathy is beautiful and a free spirit, sometimes going casually nude outdoors. She is loved by everyone, including the Dog, and especially Cooch; much to his heartbreak, as they are cousins. In the final book of the series, Kathy tells Cooch that she loves him and gives him a passionate kiss. First appearance: Book 8 (September 1983).
Stewart "Irish" Murphy
Wal's other neighbour; a brutish man who does not welcome visitors and shoots any dog that strays onto his property, Blackwater Station, or mercifully hangs them by their hind legs on a fence. Once he did this to Prince Charles and lived to regret it when Aunt Dolly found out. Always filthy ("health warning: do not approach this man downwind"), probably due to farming numerous pigs, which cause Wal plenty of grief. He has two loutish sons, Spit and Hunk. He is first mentioned in Cooch's introduction to Book 3, his pigs first appear in the same book, but he and his sons do not appear until Book 9 (October 1984).
Elvis "Spit" Murphy
The brighter of Irish Murphy's two sons, Spit is described by the Dog as "a sort of rural John Travolta with smaller lips and bigger jeans". He is Wal's rival in rugby and romance. He is also interested in Cooch's cousin Kathy.
Ronald "Hunk" Murphy
Irish Murphy's large, slow-witted and aggressive son. He is described by the Dog as "fat, pink and smelly". His nephew Lex Murphy (first appearance: Book 11) sometimes fights with Rangi.
"Irish" Murphy's pigs
A fearsome gang of three to six enormous beasts. Often lurking in the nearby river, causing consternation to unsuspecting fishermen and dogs. Always ravenous, they once defeated and ate some large sharks that swam up the estuary.
Tiger, Wolf and Creampuff, "Irish" Murphy's pig-dogs
They often terrorize the Dog, who seeks help from Wal, Horse or Major. Now and then, the Dog tries to take on all three of them at once. Creampuff is a bull terrier.
Hermit Ram "The Buffalo"
This long unshorn ram has left the mob and lives in the farm's wild scrub. He sometimes shows interest in the ewes, and Dog is sent to pursue him, but without success. First appearance: Book 11.
The Goat
One of the toughest animals on the farm, the Goat is usually tethered to a chain in Wal's garden. Wal bought him to keep the grass down, but the Goat prefers eating fruit trees and footy socks, and chasing the Dog and Wal. At one point, Wal tries in vain to sell the Goat and then decides to kill it, but cannot, exclaiming "Dammit, I know this goat!". First appearance: Book 1.
The Goose
Another character introduced in the first Footrot Flats book, the goose occasionally stalks Wal and pecks his posterior whenever possible. In the film "The Dog's Tale", the goose attempts to peck Wal and finally gets his chance when Wal rescues Irish Murphy from a river.
Cooch's goats
A cunning pack of goats that uses gang tactics to annoy Wal. For example, if Wal plants trees behind a fence, Cooch's goats will stand on each other to get over and eat them. The Dog hates mustering Cooch's goats.
Other hostile animals
In the early books, the Dog's main tormentors were the turkey, goat and pigs (Boris and Dolores). In one strip in Book 4, the goose is chasing Wal and the turkey is chasing the Dog, but Wal kicks the turkey and the Dog jumps on the goose's neck, then Wal and the Dog celebrate their partnership.

== Sport ==
Sport plays a major part in Footrot Flats. Wal plays all sorts of sports including cricket, golf, fishing, rugby union, tennis and snooker. The Dog often plays with Wal, sometimes helping him, sometimes embarrassing him and sometimes being exploited. Wal can never beat his younger brother Rex in any sport.

Wal plays for the Raupo rugby club as a hooker and is often seen playing and training in the strip. At one point Wal was replaced by a younger man as he was getting too old, but the younger player wasn't as good. The final few strips ever drawn involve an unlikely chain of events which culminate in Wal somehow scoring a try against a touring international rugby side. Wal also coaches the Raupo School rugby team, with Rangi being one of its more prominent members and the Dog serving as mascot (a duty he takes seriously, often blaming himself if the team loses).

In the cricket season, Wal plays for an unnamed team as an all-rounder, although he is sometimes pictured as the wicket keeper. Cooch often plays cricket with Wal and so does the Dog, usually fielding in the slips or in the covers (wherein the Dog's alias of 'The Scarlet Manuka' sometimes comes into play, stealing cricket balls to 'rescue' them from persecution).

Cooch also plays golf with Wal, who has a homemade course on his farm. Cooch is better than Wal at golf, even though the course is very hard (the first hole is a par 14). When they do play on a real course, Cooch usually wins. Wal claims the trees are on Cooch's side. Wal and Cooch also play snooker on a small table in Cooch's house, where a tree hampers play.

Wal also occasionally plays tennis with Cheeky Hobson and fights for her affections with Nigel Erskine, another member of the tennis club. The Dog is usually the ball boy.

Wal and Cooch frequently fish in various ways: whitebaiting, long line fishing, and most often floundering.

Other sports seen in Footrot Flats are boxing, polo, soccer, squash, badminton and shooting.

== List of publications ==
Main series

- Footrot Flats 1-27 (1978–99)
- The Footrot Flats 'Weekender' 1-8 (1985–98)
- The Puppydog Footrot Flats 1-21 (1/11/95)

Pocket books

- "They've put custard with my bone!" (1983)
- The cry of the grey ghost (1984)
- "I'm warning you, Horse..." (1985)
- It's a dog's life (1988)
- "Let slip the dogs of war!" (1992)
- Footrot Flats Pocket Book Collection (1995)

Combined collections

- Footrot Flats Collector's Edition (1987)
- Footrot Flats Collector's Edition 2 (1989)
- Footrot Flats Collector's Edition 3 (1993)
- The Footrot Flats 'Weekender' Special (1994)
- Footrot Flats Gallery 1-3 (2005–06)
- Footrot Flats Sports Collection (2005)
- Footrot Flats: The Wisdom of Dog (27/9/2010)
- The Art of Footrot Flats (25/10/2011)
- Footrot Flats: Luv from Dog (24/9/2013)
- The Essential Footrot Flats (28/10/2014)
- Footrot Flats Gallery 1 (27/10/15, Reprint)
- Footrot Flats Gallery 2 (26/10/16, Reprint)

Murray Ball Collector's Trilogy

- Footrot Flats: The Dog Strips (2007)
- Footrot Flats: The Long Weekender (2008)
- Six of the Best by Murray Ball (2009)

Misc

- Footrot Flats Collector’s Edition Box Set (1982, NZ-Only Release)
- Footrot Flats Danish Album Series 1-27 called Fæhunden (1984-2000)
- The Mini Footrot Flats (1984)
- Footrot Flats - The Stage Musical (1984)
- Footrot Flats the Motion Picture: Prospectus (1985)
- Footrot Flats: The Making of the Movie (1986)
- Footrot Flats: The Dog's ~~Tail~~ Tale (1986)
- Footrot Flats School Kit (1986)
- Footrot Flats Japanese Edition (1986)
- Footrot Flats Danish Book Series 1-12 called Fæhunden bøger (1989-2000)
- Footrot Flats in Focus - A 1990 Perspective (1989)
- Footrot Flats Chinese Edition - Counterfeit copy (1990)
- Footrot Flats Norwegian series 1-3 called 'Bikkja' (1990–93) Printed in Norway, each magazine is closer to the size of the UK editions
- Footrot Flats UK Titan Books Series 1-6 (1990–94)
- Footrot Flats Swedish Books Series 1-4 called Fähunden (1991–94)
- Footrot Flats German Edition (1991, as "Dog Von Der Stinkfuẞfarm")
- Footrot Flats USA Edition (1992) (With Foreword by Charles M. Schulz)
- Footrot Flats Calendar: 1983-1992, 1997–2000
- Footrot Flats Sports Calendar: 1988-1991
- Footrot Flats Dog Star Calendar: 1989
- The Ballad of Footrot Flats (1996)
- Footrot Flats Desk Calendar: 1997
- Footrot Flats - "The Dog's ~~Tail~~ Tale" (VHS, DVD)
- Footrot Flats - "The Dog's ~~Tail~~ Tale" (Re-release) (DVD/Blu-ray) (1/12/11)
- Footrot Flats 2015 40th Anniversary Commemorative Calendar (October 2014)
- Footrot Flats: Here's to the Good Times! (50th Anniversary Celebration) (10/11/26)

Miscellaneous merchandise included:

- Greeting cards, postcards, posters, pencil cases, coloring books, notepad
- mugs, drinking glasses, beer stein, coasters, place mats, teaspoons, plates, beer
- clothing, bed linen, tea towels, aprons, beach towels, badges, lapel pins, transfers, patches
- activity packs, door hangers, stickers, wrapping paper, matches, key-rings
- stuffed toys, jigsaw puzzles, hot water bottles, ceramics, soap figurines,

== See also ==
- New Zealand humour
- Footrot Flats: The Dog's Tale (1986 film)
- Footrot Flats: The Dog's Tale (soundtrack)
