= Murray Ball =

New Zealand cartoonist

Murray Ball ONZM
- Born: Murray Hone Ball; 26 January 1939; Feilding, New Zealand
- Died: 12 March 2017 (aged 78); Gisborne, New Zealand
- Occupation: Cartoonist
- Notable work: Footrot Flats
- Father: Nelson Ball

Murray Hone Ball ONZM (26 January 1939 – 12 March 2017) was a New Zealand cartoonist who became known for his Stanley the Palaeolithic Hero (the longest running cartoon in Punch magazine), Bruce the Barbarian, All the King's Comrades (also in Punch) and the long-running Footrot Flats comic series. In the 2002 Queen's Birthday and Golden Jubilee Honours, Ball was appointed an Officer of the New Zealand Order of Merit, for services as a cartoonist.

== Life and work ==
Ball was born in Feilding in 1939; his father was All Black rugby player Nelson Ball. He grew up in New Zealand before spending some years in Australia and South Africa, where he attended Parktown Boys' High School and finished his education. He played for the Junior All Blacks in 1959 as a "first five-eighth" (number 10). As a young man he worked for the Dominion newspaper in Wellington and the Manawatu Times before becoming a freelance cartoonist and moving to Scotland, where he found work with publishers DC Thomson, of Dundee.

He developed his character Stanley and had it published in the influential English humour-magazine Punch. Stanley the Palaeolithic Hero featured a caveman who wore glasses and struggled with the Neolithic environment. It became the longest-running strip in Punch's history, and other English and non-English speaking countries syndicated it. Ball continued to contribute to Punch after returning with his family to New Zealand.

Ball's early cartoons often had political overtones; his mid-70s UK strips included All the King's Comrades, Stanley often expresses left-wing attitudes, and he described himself in the introduction to The Sisterhood (1993) as a socialist, and he was avidly anti-apartheid while in South Africa. Despite this, he has also been accused of racism, and often found himself at odds with contemporary leftists, especially on issues regarding gender identity, feminism, transgenderism, and abortion.

In the 2002 Queen's Birthday and Golden Jubilee Honours, Ball was appointed an Officer of the New Zealand Order of Merit, for services as a cartoonist.

Tributes paid to him included these:

Murray was a great influence to many Australian cartoonists and will be long remembered by his friends across the sea here in Australia.

— President of the Australian Cartoonists Association Jules Faber

Ball was funny and goofy and generous, and incredibly serious about inequality

— Tom Scott

Sheer brilliance

— Charles M. Schulz, talking of Dog

== Footrot Flats ==
After 1975 Ball wrote several comics in New Zealand (for instance 'Nature Calls'), but it was in 1976 that he first published the strip Footrot Flats in Wellington's afternoon newspaper, The Evening Post. It rapidly led to the demise of his other strips including Stanley, which he was still writing for Punch.

The strip follows the adventures of a working sheep-dog called (if anything) "Dog" or "The Dog" or "@*&#!", his owner Wal Footrot and the other characters, human and animal, that they encounter or associate with. Ball expresses Dog's thoughts in thought-bubbles, though he clearly remains "just a dog" (rather than the heavily anthropomorphised creatures sometimes found in other comics or animation). Dog also has alter-egos including "The Grey Ghost" and "The Iron Paw".

Ball's Footrot Flats has appeared in syndication in international newspapers, and in over 40 published books. Footrot Flats inspired a stage musical, a theme-park and New Zealand's first feature-length animated film, Footrot Flats: The Dog's Tale (1986). Footrot Flats characters include Wal, Dog, Cooch, Cheeky Hobson, Aunt Dolly, Horse, Pongo, Rangi, Charlie, Major, Jess and the Murphy family of Irish and Hunk and Spit.

Footrot Flats features several remarkable traits: its expansive created-universe, complete with ancillary characters, things and places; the fact that the characters slowly but perceptibly age and mature throughout the twenty-year run of the comic; and the gradual encroachment of political themes over the years (particularly environmentalism and gentle parodies of feminism).

Ball said he wanted his cartoons to have an impact. "The heart of a cartoon is the idea, an artist can create a painting, hang it on the wall and be satisfied with what he has achieved even if no-one else sees it. In cartooning, you must get a human reaction to the idea. The task of the cartoonist is to translate his idea into a drawing that will have impact". He ceased drawing the cartoon in 1994.

== Death ==
Ball lived with his wife Pam on a rural property near Gisborne. In an interview on Radio New Zealand National on 27 January 2016, Pam said that Murray's health had been poor for the previous six years and that he was suffering from dementia. Ball died 12 March 2017. Pam Ball died in 2026.

== Bibliography ==
In addition to his cartoon collections, Ball wrote and illustrated eight books:

- Fifteen Men on a Dead Man's Chest, a satirical look at New Zealand rugby.
- Migod! It's Bruce the Barbarian, which pitted Bruce, a socialist warrior from Footrot Flats, New Zealand, against the wealthy and malevolent upper classes of the ancient Roman Empire.
- The People Makers (1970), a humorous account of Ball's time as a teacher.
- Quentin Hankey: Traitor (1986), political satire revolving around a Clinton Hankey, nationalist and born antihero "crusading for a brave new world"
- The Sisterhood (1993), a controversial political work highly critical of contemporary feminism.
- The Flowering of Adam Budd (1998), a coming-of-age story.
- Tarzan, Gene Kelly And Me (2001), approximately, an autobiography.
- Fred the (Quite) Brave Mouse, a children's book about a mouse in love.

Ball also wrote a large-format illustrated novel whose verse parodied the Australian bush-ballad as popularised by Banjo Paterson and Henry Lawson. Titled The Ballad of Footrot Flats, it was published in 1996. Originally intended as a second film script, this work was the first new Footrot material which Ball had published since 1994. It was the last of the Footrot series.

== Interests ==
Murray Ball and Charles M. Schulz each admired the other's work. One Footrot Flats strip shows Dog laughing at a Snoopy cartoon. Schulz wrote the introduction to the only Footrot Flats published in the United States (it appeared as Footrot Flats there, but as Footrot Flats 4 in Australasia.)

== See also ==
- New Zealand literature
- Footrot Flats, comic strip written by Murray Ball
- Footrot Flats: The Dog's Tale, 1986, animated film
