= Graham Harvey (actor) =

Australian actor

- Born: c.1960 Adelaide, South Australia
- Education: National Institute of Dramatic Art (NIDA)
- Occupation: Actor
- Years active: 1975–
- Known for: The Sullivans; The Young Doctors; Return to Eden; E Street; Neighbours

Graham Harvey (born c.1960) is an Australian actor, best known for his roles in television soap operas.

== Early life and education ==
Harvey was born in Adelaide. He studied acting at Sydney's National Institute of Dramatic Art (NIDA).

== Career ==
His first television role after graduating from NIDA was Robbie McGovern, a repatriated veteran, in The Sullivans. Harvey quit The Sullivans in late 1980, however, as his character was in the middle of an important storyline, he agreed to work beyond his expired contract. In 1981, he starred in a stage production of No Names, No Pack Drill alongside Christine Jeston at the Queensland Theatre Company. In 1984, he played Errol Barr in the New Zealand feature film Constance.

His major television roles include The Young Doctors as Dr. David Henderson, Return to Eden as Chris Harper, E Street as Michael Sturgess, and Neighbours as Rob Evans – a love interest for Joanna Hartman (Emma Harrison).

Harvey has also guested in a number of television dramas, including A Country Practice in 1981 and 1989, G.P. and Embassy in 1990, and a 1992 episode of The Flying Doctors.

In 1993, Harvey starred as Peter Walker in the ABC documentary film The Last Man Hanged, which tells the story of Ronald Ryan, the last man to be legally executed in Australia.

== Filmography ==
=== Film ===
Year	Title	Role	Notes
1984	Constance	Errol Barr	
1997	Violet's Visit	Alex	
2010	Mrs Wright	Theodor	Short film

=== Television ===
Year	Title	Role	Notes
1979	Skyways	Greg Freeman	Episode 182: "The Unkindest Cut of All"
1980–1981	The Sullivans	Robbie McGovern	201 episodes
1982	Sara Dane	Duncan	Miniseries, 2 episodes
1982–1983	The Young Doctors	Dr. David Henderson	74 episodes
	Return to Eden	Chris Harper	
1983	Carson's Law	Kenneth Turner	Season 1, episode 55: "Scent of Battle"
1990	G.P.	Alex Brewster	Season 2, episode 10: "Payback"
1990	Embassy	Tom	Season 1, episode 7: "With Prejudice"
1990–1991	E Street	Michael Sturgess	98 episodes
1981–1992	A Country Practice	Geoff Hutton / Dr Brad Kurnell / Lachie Hughes	6 episodes
1992	The Flying Doctors	Joey Conway	Season 9, episode 25: "The Accomplice"
1993	The Last Man Hanged	Peter Walker	TV documentary film
1996	Neighbours	Rob Evans	13 episodes
1997	Water Rats	Gary Mayo	Season 2, episode 7: "End of the Line"
1997	Big Sky	Price	Season 1, episode 38: "Edge of Reality"
2007	All Saints	Adam Jarvis	Season 10, episode 11: "Life Interrupted"

== Theatre ==
Year	Title	Role	Company
1975	The Winslow Boy		Playhouse, Adelaide with STCSA
1979; 1981	The Seagull	Constantine Trepliov	NIDA Theatre, Sydney, SGIO Theatre, Brisbane with Queensland Theatre Company (QTC)
1979	The Beggar's Opera		NIDA Theatre, Sydney, Playhouse, Canberra
1979	The Ballad of the Sad Café		NIDA Theatre, Sydney
1981	No Names... No Pack Drill	Harry "Rebel" Potter	SGIO Theatre, Brisbane with QTC
1981	Cyrano de Bergerac	Cut Purse / Others	Sydney Opera House with Sydney Theatre Company (STC)
1982	What the Butler Saw		Marian Street Theatre, Sydney
1983–1985	The Life and Adventures of Nicholas Nickleby	Jennings / Master Crummles / Mr Pike	Theatre Royal Sydney, State Theatre, Melbourne, Festival Theatre, Adelaide with The MLC Theatre Royal Company, STC, MTC and J. C. Williamson's
1985	The Resistible Rise of Arturo Ui		Seymour Centre, Sydney with Nimrod
1985	The Real Thing		Sydney Opera House with STC
1986	Sweet Bird of Youth	Tom Junior	Lyric Theatre, Brisbane, Opera Theatre, Adelaide, Her Majesty's Theatre, Sydney, Princess Theatre, Melbourne
1986	Measure for Measure		Wharf Theatre, Sydney with STC
1987	No(h) Exit		Wharf Theatre, Sydney with STC
1987	The Winter’s Tale		Seymour Centre, Sydney with Nimrod
1987	The Golden Age		Seymour Centre, Sydney with Nimrod
1987	Les Liaisons Dangereuses		Seymour Centre, Sydney with Nimrod
1988	Death of a Salesman		Glen Street Theatre, Sydney
1989	The Normal Heart		Wharf Theatre, Sydney with STC
1990	Burn This		Wharf Theatre, Sydney with STC
1994	Straight and Narrow		Sydney Opera House
1994	The Gift of the Gorgon	Philip	Suncorp Theatre, Brisbane with RQTC
1998	My Night with Reg		Newtown Theatre, Sydney with Esoteric Entertainment
1999	The Merchant of Venice	Antonio	Sydney Opera House, Playhouse, Canberra, Melbourne Athenaeum, Gold Coast Arts Centre, Theatre Royal, Hobart, Geelong Arts Centre, Orange Civic Theatre, His Majesty's Theatre, Perth with Bell Shakespeare
2009	Starlight Express	Swing	TSB Arena, Wellington
