= I'll Make You Happy =

I'll Make You Happy may refer to:

- I'll Make You Happy (1944 film), a Hungarian comedy film
- I'll Make You Happy (1949 film), a West German comedy film
- I'll Make You Happy (1999 film), a New Zealand film
- I'll Make You Happy, a song by The Easybeats, from the EP Easyfever
