= Michael Hurst =

New Zealand actor, director and writer

Michael Hurst ONZM
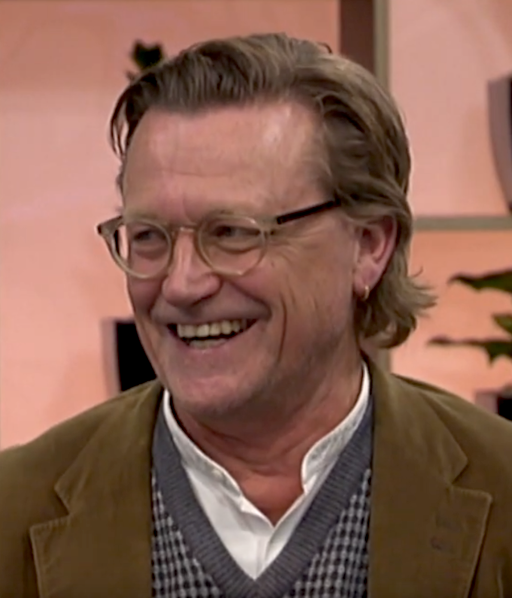
- Hurst in 2018
- Born: Michael Eric Hurst; Lancashire, England
- Occupations: Actor, director, writer
- Years active: 1976–present
- Spouse: Jennifer Ward-Lealand
- Children: 2
- Website: michaelhurst.co.nz

Michael Eric Hurst ONZM is a British-born New Zealand actor, director, and writer. Born on 1957, he is known as a theatre actor, especially in Shakespearean roles, and more widely known for his roles in the television series Hercules: The Legendary Journeys and Xena: Warrior Princess as Iolaus. He directed the Starz series Spartacus: Blood and Sand and Ash vs Evil Dead. He plays a lead role in the 2025 Australian satirical dark comedy film Birthright.

== Early life and education ==
Michael Eric Hurst was born in Lancashire, England. (Note: There are many fan websites that appear to mirror earlier versions of this Wikipedia article, but no reliable source stating date or place of birth.)

When he was seven his family moved to Christchurch, New Zealand. He enrolled at Papanui High School, then University of Canterbury, but for only one year.

== Career ==
=== Stage ===
Hurst is known as a Shakespearean actor.

In 2015, after runs in New Zealand and at the 2014 Edinburgh Festival Fringe, Hurst directed The Generation of Z: Apocalypse at a purpose-built venue in East London between 4 April 2015 to July 2015. The performance gave the audience choices which could affect the outcome of scenes, then quite new.

He has also appeared in several solo stage productions, including No Holds Bard (based on several Shakespearian characters) in 2018, and An Illiad in 2019.

In 2023, he presented his solo show The Golden Ass at several locations around New Zealand. At the Stratford Shakespeare Festival in New Zealand in April, he performed The Golden Ass and No Holds Bard. In the same year, he directed the play Waiting for Waiting for Godot by Dave Hanson, and directed and starred in King Lear for Auckland Theatre Company.

=== Screen ===
In 1984, Hurst won the lead role of David Blyth's Death Warmed Up, New Zealand's first splatter movie. The plot saw Hurst's character weathering institutionalisation, sundry wackos, and a motorcycle chase in the tunnels below Waiheke Island. The film won the grand prize at a fantasy film festival in Paris. The same year Hurst began playing drummer Dave Nelson over two series of Heroes, about a band searching for fame.

Crime thriller Dangerous Orphans (1986) is the first film in which Hurst co-starred with real-life partner Jennifer Ward-Lealand (he had already acted with her on-stage). Hurst's role was one of three grown orphans caught up in a mission to one-up various criminal figures; Ward-Lealand played romantic interest to one of the other orphans. Hurst would work with Ward-Lealand again on his next three features, 1992's The Footstep Man, 1993's Desperate Remedies and 1999's I'll Make You Happy.

In 1993, he starred alongside Australian Sophie Lee and Brit Greg Wise in the TV thriller Typhon's People. Hurst played a European mystery man uncovering the truth behind corporate genetic meddling. The script was by author Margaret Mahy.

Hurst went on to co-star in Hercules: The Legendary Journeys with Kevin Sorbo, playing sidekick Iolaus to Sorbo's Hercules.

Hurst made his feature debut as a director with Jubilee (2000), based on the 1994 novel by Nepi Solomon. The film stars Cliff Curtis as a kind-hearted procrastinator who gets the chance to prove himself by organising a 75th jubilee. Hurst followed Jubilee by directing Love Mussel, a one-off satire for television. Written by Stephen Sinclair and starring Kevin Smith, Love Mussel is a mockumentary about a fictional township which erects a monument to a shellfish with Viagra-like properties.

He plays a lead role of Richard, a baby boomer father, in Zoe Pepper's feature film directorial debut, the dark satirical comedy Birthright, which premiered at Tribeca Film Festival in New York City in June 2025.

== Recognition and awards ==
In 2003, Hurst was awarded an Arts Foundation of New Zealand Laureate Award. In the 2005 Queen's Birthday Honours, he was appointed an Officer of the New Zealand Order of Merit, for services to film and the theatre.

In October 2018, Hurst was presented with a Scroll of Honour from the Variety Artists Club of New Zealand for his contribution to New Zealand entertainment.

== Personal life ==
Hurst married New Zealand actress Jennifer Ward-Lealand and they have two sons.

== Filmography ==
=== Starring roles ===
Year	Title	Role	Notes
1981	Prisoners	Sciano	Film
1982	Casualties of Peace	Peter	TV movie
1984	Constance	Photographer (scenes deleted)	Film
1984	Heroes	Dave Nelson	TV series
1984	Death Warmed Up	Michael Tucker	Film
1985	Dangerous Orphans	Moir	Film
1989	The Shadow Trader	Bob Hoyle	TV mini-series
1992	The Footstep Man	Henri de Toulouse-Lautrec	Film
1993	Typhon's People	Constantine	TV movie
1993	Desperate Remedies	Willam Poyser	Film
1994	Hercules and the Amazon Women	Iolaus	TV movie
1994	Hercules in the Underworld	Aelus/Charon	TV movie
1994	Hercules in the Maze of the Minotaur	Iolaus	TV movie
1995	Hercules: The Legendary Journeys	Iolaus/Charon/Orestes/Dahak/Widow Twankey	TV series (79 episodes)
1997	A Moment Passing	Joey	Short Film
1997	The Bar		Short Film
1997	Highwater	Hugh Chance	TV movie
1998	Hercules and Xena - The Animated Movie: The Battle for Mount Olympus	Iolaus	Voice
1998	Young Hercules	The Jeweler	Video
1999	I'll Make You Happy	Lou	Film
1999	This Is It	Narrator, host, and various historical figures	TV special
2001	The Man Who Has Everything	George Allwell	TV movie
2002	Honey	Nic	Short Film
2002	Showstoppers	celebrity judge	TV series
2003	Murder on the Blade?	Defence lawyer	TV movie
2004	Fracture	Athol Peet	Film
2004	Hold the Anchovies	Manager & Old Iraqi	Video
2006	Maddigan's Quest	Maska	TV series
2006	Treasure Island Kids: The Monster of Treasure Island	ferry pilot	Film
2007	Ask Your Uncles	Presenter	TV series
2007	The Tattooist	Crash	Film
2007	We're Here To Help	Rodney Hide	Film
2007	The Last Magic Show	Trevor Norton	Film
2007	The Map Reader	Alison's father	Film
2009	Bitch Slap	Gage	Film
2012	Inorganic	Brett	Short Film
2014	Death Walks into a Bar	God of War	Short Film
2018	Vermilion	Smoking Man	Film
2018	Dead	Ross Marbeck	Film
2019	Northspur	Green (lead)	Film
2025	Birthright	Richard	Film

=== Guest-starring roles ===
Year	Title	Role	Episode
1976	Thirty Minute Theatre	Jim	"Tinkling Brass"
1983	Both Sides of the Fence	Gary McNabb	1.09
1983	Country GP	Mark Sloane	1.32
1985	Hanlon	Elliot	1.6 "In Defence of Shue Rock"
1985	Hanlon	Elliot	1.7 "Hanlon - In Defence"
1989	Shark in the Park	David Jennings	2.8 "Acting Sergeant"
1990	The New Adventures of Black Beauty	Kurt	1.08 "The Birdman"
1990	The Ray Bradbury Theater	Roger Shumway	4.08 "The Toynbee Convector"
1991	For the Love of Mike	Laurie	1.06
1992	The Ray Bradbury Theater	Lt. Simmons	6.06 "The Long Rain"
1995, 1997	Xena: Warrior Princess	Iolaus	1.08 "Prometheus", 2.13 "The Quest"
1996	Xena: Warrior Princess	Charon	1.16 "Mortal Beloved"
1997	E! News Daily	Himself	
1997	Entertainment Tonight	Himself	
1998	Young Hercules	Charon	1.20 "A Lady in Hades"
1999	Celebrity Profile	Himself	"Lucy Lawless"
1999	Backch@t	Himself	2.01
1999	Sunday News Give Us a Clue	Himself	
1999	Duggan	Michael Taylor	1.3 "A Shadow of Doubt: Part 1"
1999	Duggan	Michael Taylor	1.4 "A Shadow of Doubt: Part 2"
2000	Topp Twins	celebrity golfer	3.05 "Bowls and Golf"
2000	Mai Time	Himself	
2000	Celebrity Profile	Himself	"Kevin Sorbo"
2000	Jack of All Trades	Captain Nardo da Vinci	2.2 "Shark Bait"
2001	Love Mussel	Stephen Jessop	TV movie
2001	Xena: Warrior Princess	Nigel	6.13 "You Are There"
2002	Andromeda	Ryan	2.20 "The Knight, Death and the Devil"
2002	Mataku	Dr. Forbes	1.05 "The Final Plume"
2003	Good Morning	Himself	
2003	Shortland Street	Greg Vicelich	Recurring (10 episodes)
2003	Power Rangers: Ninja Storm	"D.J. Drummond" (voice)	1.20 "Good Will Hunter"
2003	Power Rangers: Ninja Storm	"Vexacus" (voice)	1.27 "Shane's Karma: Part 2", 1.30 "The Wild Wipeout", 1.31 "Double-Edged Blake", 1.33 "General Deception, Part I", 1.34 "General Deception, Part II", 1.35 "A Gem of a Day", 1.36 "Down and Dirty", 1.37 "Storm Before the Calm, Part I", 1.38 "Storm Before the Calm, Part II"
2005	Power Rangers: S.P.D.	Silverhead (voice)	1.28 "Robotpalooza"
2005	Frontseat	Himself	2.24
2007	Here to Stay	Himself	1.03 "The English"
2009	Legend of the Seeker	Amfortas	1.13 "Revenant"
2010	The Jono Project	"Michael Hurst"	1.12 "Sir Butch"
2012	Spartacus: Vengeance	Roman soldier – uncredited	2.09 "Monsters"
2012	The Almighty Johnsons	Kvasir	2.01 "And She Will Come to You"
2012	The Almighty Johnsons	Kvasir	2.11 "The House of Jerome"
2012	The Almighty Johnsons	Kvasir	2.12 "You Call This the Real World?"
2012	The Almighty Johnsons	Kvasir	2.13 "Does this Look Like Asgard?"
2012	Auckland Daze	Michael	1.06
2014	Auckland Daze	Michael	2.05
2014	Auckland Daze	Michael	2.06
2016	Terry Teo	Cornelius Jones	1.04 "Head to Head"
2016	Highroad	The Director	3.04 "39 Lashes"
2020	Dead	Ross Marbeck	
2021	My Life Is Murder	Otto Klein	2.10 "Pleasure & Pain"
2021	Power Rangers: Dino Fury	Nibyro Guardian (voice)	1.20 "Waking Nightmare"

=== Director ===
The numbers in directing credits refer to the number of episodes.

Title	Year	Credited as	Notes
Title	Year	Director	Notes
I'm So Lonesome I Could Cry	1994	Yes	Short film, also writer
Hercules: The Legendary Journeys	1996–99	Yes (6)	Television series
A Silent Welcome	1976	Yes	Short film, also writer
Amazon High	1997	Yes	Unaired pilot
Xena: Warrior Princess	1997–2001	Yes (6)	Television series
Jack of All Trades	2000	Yes (2)	Television series
Jubilee	2000	Yes	
Love Mussel	2001	Yes	Television film
Treasure Island Kids 2: The Monster of Treasure Island	2006	Yes	
Treasure Island Kids 3: The Mystery of Treasure Island	2006	Yes	
Legend of the Seeker	2009–10	Yes (7)	Television series
Spartacus	2010–13	Yes (8)	Television series
The Almighty Johnsons	2013	Yes (2)	Television series
The Brokenwood Mysteries	2014	Yes (1)	Television series
Step Dave	2014–15	Yes (5)	Television series
Tatau	2015	Yes (2)	Television series
Ash vs Evil Dead	2015	Yes (2)	Television series
Balloons	2016	Yes	Short film, also writer
Westside	2016–present	Yes (15)	Television series
800 Words	2016–17	Yes (10)	Television series
The Dead Lands	2020	Yes (4)	Television series
Between Two Worlds	2020	Yes (2)	Television series
My Life Is Murder	2021	Yes (2)	Television series
Power Rangers Dino Fury	2021	Yes (6)	Television series
Power Rangers Cosmic Fury	2023	Yes (6)	Television series

=== Producer ===
Year	Title	Notes
2012	Spartacus: War of the Damned	TV series

=== Writer ===
Year	Title	Notes
1994	I'm So Lonesome I Could Cry	Screenplay
1996	Clown Story	Story
