= Kingi's Story =

- Directed by: Mike Walker
- Written by: Mike Walker
- Produced by: Mike Walker
- Starring: Mitchell Manuel
- Cinematography: Chris Crowe
- Edited by: Paul Sutorius
- Music by: Terry Gray
- Release date: May 23, 1982
- Running time: 50 min
- Country: New Zealand
- Language: English

Kingi's Story is a 1982 New Zealand television film. It is about a Maori teenager in prison reflecting on his past. It's based on the experiences of teenage wards of the state. It aired on One on 23 May. At the 1982 Prague Internationa TV festival it won an international press award. It was followed by Kingpin.

Lead actor Mitchell Manuel later wrote of the production "It's perhaps hard to imagine the problems making a 50 minute television drama in 1981, with a lead role for a Māori character, an actor with no experience, and a director with little feature length or TV experience".

== Cast ==
- Mitchell Manuel as Kingi
- Gina-Marie Allan as Sharon
- Te Whatanui Skipworth as Kingi's Father
- Moira Walker as Kingi's Mother
- Martyn Sanderson as Teacher
- Adele Chapman as Jillian
- James McFarlane as School Principal
- Prue Langbein as Social Worker
- Roger Page as Drunk
