= Patrick Wilson (New Zealand actor) =

New Zealand actor

Patrick Wilson (born ~1957) is a New Zealand actor who has appeared on stage and screen. Main roles he has played include as "Arthur Short" in Rude Awakenings, opposite Danielle Cormack, as Brian, the father of the bride, in the 2008 film Second Hand Wedding and as Ron "Rooter" Baylis in the satirical comedy Spin Doctors.

He served as an officer in the New Zealand Police before attending classes at the Actors Institute of London and LAMDA. He has appeared in Spin Doctors, Xena: Warrior Princess, Hercules: The Legendary Journeys, Mercy Peak and Shortland Street. On stage he has played in Equus, Weighing In, Hitchcock Blonde (Fortune Theatre, Dunedin) and Spreading Out (Fortune Theatre, Dunedin).

== Filmography ==
=== Films ===
Year	Film	Role	Notes
2008	Second Hand Wedding	Brian Rose	Father of the bride
2000	Savage Honeymoon	Detective Skinner	
1998	Larger Than Life	Removal Man #1	
1996	Broken English	Dave	

=== Television ===
Year	Film	Role	Notes
2016-2021	Doctor Doctor (Australian TV series)	Rod Eagle	24 episodes
2013	Power Games: The Packer–Murdoch War	Alick McKay	1 episode
2013	Packed to the Rafters	Malcolm	1 episode
2010	Rescue: Special Ops	Driver	1 episode
2010	Outrageous Fortune	Damien	Help, Help, Ho! (#6.8)
2007	Rude Awakenings	Arthur Short	10 episodes
2007	Amazing Extraordinary Friends	Barman	The Incredible Cosmic Gal (#2.7)
2006	Maddigan's Quest	Mayor of Gramth	Gramth (#1.3)
2005	Power Rangers S.P.D.	Security Guard #2 & Dragoul	3 episodes
2004	Not Only But Always	Immigration Officer	TV movie
2004	Power Rangers Dino Thunder	Monster General #1 & News Reporter	4 episodes
2003	You Wish!	Set Security Guy	TV movie
2001-2003	Mercy Peak	Eric Whitelaw	17 episodes
2001	Love Mussel	Peter	TV movie
2000	Spin Doctors	Roy Bayliss	Unknown episodes
2000	Jack of All Trades	Lewis	Up the Creek (#1.12)
2000	Cleopatra 2525	Ek	Flying Lessons (#1.3)
1999	Young Hercules	Hunter #1	Hind Sight (#1.36)
1997	Coalface	Brian	
1995	Xena: Warrior Princess	Cyclops	Sins of the Past (#1.1)
1995-1999	Hercules: The Legendary Journeys	Various characters	5 episodes
1994	Hercules and the Lost Kingdom	Chief Monk	TV movie
