= Peter Vere-Jones =

New Zealand actor (1939–2021)

Peter Vere-Jones ONZM
- Born: 21 October 1939; Bucklow, Cheshire, England
- Died: 26 January 2021 (aged 81); Waikanae, New Zealand
- Occupation: Actor
- Years active: 1969–2013
- Spouse: Sue Vere-Jones
- Children: 2
- Relatives: David Vere-Jones (brother)

Peter Vere-Jones ONZM (21 October 1939 – 26 January 2021) was a New Zealand actor. He was known for his collaborations with director Peter Jackson, appearing in four of his films. He was also known for starring in the New Zealand television series Shortland Street.

== Personal life ==
Vere-Jones was born in Cheshire, England, on 21 October 1939, the son of Isabel (née Wyllie) and Noel Vere-Jones, a biochemist and chemical engineer. The family emigrated to New Zealand in 1949, settling in the Wellington area.

Vere-Jones lived with his wife Sue and his two children, Benjamin and Emma. In 1989, he was diagnosed with bowel cancer, which was documented in a television documentary called Crisis: One Man's Fight. He later made a full recovery. He died in Waikanae on 26 January 2021.

== Honours ==
In the 2002 Queen's Birthday and Golden Jubilee Honours, Vere-Jones was appointed an Officer of the New Zealand Order of Merit, for services to writing and acting.

== Filmography ==
Year	Title	Role	Notes
1969	The Alpha Plan	Edward Harris	Television series
1970	The Crown in New Zealand	Narrator	Documentary
1971	The Killing of Kane	Kimble Bent	Television film
1972	Rangi's Catch	Mr. Murray	
1972	Pukemanu	Mark Gold	Television series 6 episodes
1974	The Hum	Narrator	Documentary
1977	The Mackenzie Affair	Highlander	Television mini-series
1979	Children of Fire Mountain	James Gregory	Television mini-series
1981	Pictures	Walter Burton	
1982	Bad Blood	Mr. Ogier	
1982	Casualties of Peace	Bill	Television film
1983	Nate and Hayes	Gunboat Captain	
1984	Mortimer's Patch	Lionel Foster	Television series 1 episode
1985	Roche	Jim Donaldson	Television series 1 episode
1986	Dangerous Orphans	Handesman	
1987	Bad Taste	Lord Crumb	Voice
1988	Good Taste Made Bad Taste	Narrator	Documentary
1989	Meet the Feebles	Bletch/Arthur/Various	Voice
1989	Crisis: One Man's Fight	Himself	Documentary
1990	The Grasscutter	Kepple	Television film
1992	Shortland Street	Laurence Buchanan	Television series
1992	Braindead	Undertaker	
1992	Secrets	Jock	Television film
1993	Typhon's People	Bank manager	Television film
1995	Fallout	Gerald Hensley	Television mini-series
1996	Xena: Warrior Princess	King Silvus	Television series 1 episode
1997	Hercules: The Legendary Journeys	Zeus	Television series 1 episode
1997	Duggan	Arthur Jamieson	Television series 1 episode
1997	The Enid Blyton Secret Series	Uncle Henry	Television series 1 episode
1998	The Adventures of Swiss Family Robinson	Captain Blacker	Television series 3 episodes
1998	The Legend of William Tell	The Master	Television series 1 episode
1999	A Twist in the Tale	Grandad	Television series 1 episode
2000	Dark Knight	Abbot Goodwin	Television series 1 episode
2002	Revelations – The Initial Journey	Buchanan	Television series
2002	Der Liebe entgegen	Anwalt Alan Smith	Television series 1 episode
2005	The Knock	Psychiatrist	Short film Uncredited
2010	Legend of the Seeker	Carraticus Zorander	Television series 1 episode
2013	The Hobbit: The Desolation of Smaug	Spider	Voice
