= Tom Sainsbury =

New Zealand comedian, actor and writer

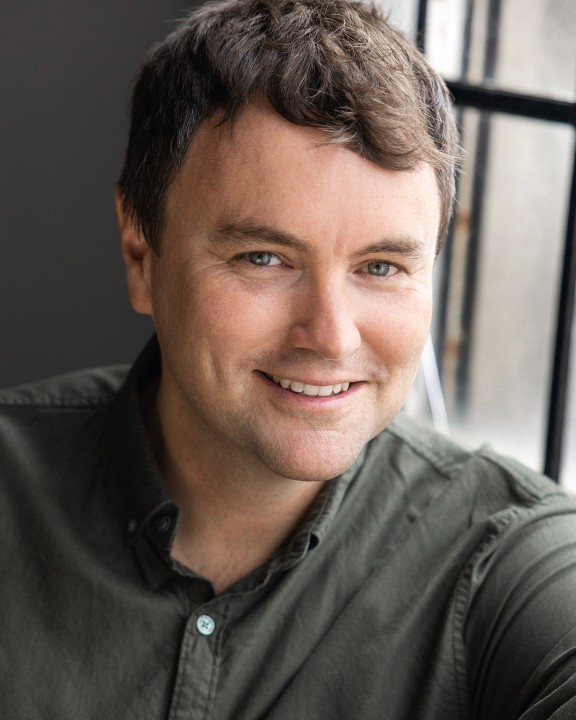
- Sainsbury in 2023
- Born: Thomas Sainsbury; 1981 or 1982 (age 43–44); Matamata, New Zealand
- Occupations: Actor; comedian; director; writer
- Years active: 2005–present

Comedy career
- Medium: Stand-up; film; television; theatre; books
- Genres: Observational comedy; satire; black comedy; political satire; self-deprecation; cringe comedy; deadpan

Thomas Sainsbury (born 1981 or 1982) is a New Zealand actor, writer, comedian, and filmmaker. He began his career in theatre as an actor and playwright, before gaining widespread recognition in New Zealand from 2017 for his short-form comedy videos released on social media.

As a screenwriter and performer, Sainsbury has contributed to many local television shows, including Wellington Paranormal, and feature films Pork Pie and Loop Track. With Madeline Sami he co-wrote Super City, which won the SWANZ Scriptwriters Best Comedy Script Award in 2011.

His 2023 podcast Small Town Scandal won Podcast of the Year and Best Comedy Podcast at the 2024 New Zealand Radio & Podcast Awards. A television version was released in 2026.

== Early life and education ==
Thomas Sainsbury was born in 1981 or 1982 in Matamata, New Zealand, and is the youngest of three children. He was raised on a dairy farm and attended Matamata College. Sainsbury was encouraged in acting and drama by his parents, including at age 9, accompanying them to the Matamata Operatic Society rendition of Little Shop of Horrors. He was immediately inspired to write a sequel for his school assembly and thrived in the creative process of writing and performing it.

In 2000, Sainsbury moved to Auckland to study for a Bachelor of Arts at the University of Auckland and decided on English literature and theatre as his major. Throughout his studies, he wrote and produced plays in Auckland theatres including Silo Theatre and The Basement Theatre.

== Career ==
=== Theatre ===
Sainsbury established himself as a playwright in New Zealand, producing over 50 plays. Notable theatre works include And Then You Die, The Christmas Monologues, The Mall, Loser, A Simple Procedure, and Sunday Roast. Several of these plays have been performed internationally.

He has also written, co-written, and performed in numerous live comedy theatre productions, including The Opening Night Before Christmas, Infectious, Camping, D.O.C.ing, Giggly Gerties, Dynamotion, Gays in Space and Hauraki Horror. These productions frequently featured collaborations with other New Zealand comedians, including Kura Forrester, Brynley Stent and Chris Parker.

Sainsbury is a four-time winner of the Playmarket Young Playwright of the Year. He has also been a three-time finalist for the Bruce Mason Playwriting Award. His play The Canary won the Playmarket 2010 Special Prize for an Auckland Playwright.

=== Film and television ===
In 2010, Sainsbury and Madeline Sami co-wrote Super City, a TV comedy series set in Auckland, New Zealand. It won the 2011 SWANZ Best Comedy Script award and was optioned by American network ABC in 2012.

Sainsbury has written and collaborated on many New Zealand web series and comedy shows, including International Emmy Awards winner INSiDE.

As an actor, he has appeared in Shortland Street as Jason Kirkpatrick and in TV comedy series including Educators, Under the Vines, Sweet Tooth, and Wellington Paranormal. In 2020, Sainsbury co-wrote and starred in the horror comedy feature film Dead. He also appeared in Pork Pie. In 2023, he wrote, directed and starred in the horror film Loop Track. In 2024, he appeared in The Rule of Jenny Pen.

He created and starred in Small Town Scandal, a television comedy programme based on his podcast of the same name, broadcast in 2026.

=== Comedian ===
Sainsbury has worked as a comedian in New Zealand since 2014..

From 2017, Sainsbury gained widespread recognition for short-form comedy videos released on social media, which combined character comedy with satire of New Zealand culture and public figures. His most viewed videos from this period featured impersonations of politicians, including Paula Bennett, Simon Bridges and Jacinda Ardern. These performances often made use of wigs, costumes, and Snapchat face-manipulation filters. While political impersonation formed a notable part of his early online output, Sainsbury later shifted focus toward broader character-based and narrative comedy.

His social media work earned widespread recognition, including being named the New Zealand Herald's Entertainment Hero of the Year in 2020. The same year, he released a non-fiction book called New Zealanders: A Field Guide, which expanded on characters developed in his online comedy and offered satirical descriptions of familiar New Zealand archetypes.

As a comedy personality, he has appeared on numerous New Zealand comedy panel shows and entertainment programmes including Jono and Ben, 7 Days, Have You Been Paying Attention?, The Masked Singer, Guy Montgomery's Guy Mont-Spelling Bee, and Taskmaster New Zealand. In 2021 and 2022, he appeared as a regular team captain on TVNZ's revival of Give Us a Clue and co-hosted the competitive cooking series Snack Masters.

In 2023, he received the Rielly Comedy Award from the Variety Artists Club of New Zealand for his contribution to New Zealand entertainment. That year, he also released the fictional comedy murder-mystery podcast series Small Town Scandal that was produced and distributed by New Zealand Media and Entertainment. In 2024, the series won both ‘Podcast of the Year’ and ‘Best Comedy Podcast’ at the New Zealand Radio & Podcast Awards, and was subsequently announced for television adaptation.

== Personal life ==
Sainsbury is openly gay. In interviews, he has spoken about his coming out and his experiences prior to publicly identifying as gay. He has also discussed his role as a sperm donor for a lesbian couple, describing his relationship with their children as similar to that of an uncle.

== Awards ==
- Playmarket Young Playwright of the Year – Four-time winner (2001), (2003), (2005) and (2007)
- Bruce Mason Playwriting Award – Two-time Nominee (2008) and (2009)
- Aotearoa Film and Television Awards (2011) – Nominated for Best Script – Drama/Comedy (with Madeleine Sami): for Super City
- SWANZ Scriptwriters Awards (NZ Writers Guild) (2011) – Best Comedy Script (with Madeleine Sami): for Super City, episode three
- Aotearoa Filmmaking Competition (48Hours) – Two-time National Winner (2016) and (2018)
- Billy T Award, New Zealand Comedy Trust (2019) – Nominee
- New Zealand Herald's Entertainment Hero of the Year (2020)
- International Emmy (2021) for Best Short-Form Series for INSiDE (and was the only Australasian nominee of the awards)
- Aotearoa Film and Television Awards (2022) Best Comedy Script: for Wellington Paranormal, series four, Episode four
- Rielly Comedy Award, Variety Artists Club of New Zealand, 2023
- New Zealand Podcast Award (2023) – Best Fiction Podcast for Small Town Scandal
- New Zealand Radio & Podcast Awards (2024) – Podcast of the Year and Best Comedy Podcast for Small Town Scandal

== Filmography ==
Television

Year	Title	Role
2011	Super City	Writer, Casting, Actor, Executive Producer
2015–17	Jono & Ben	Various – Sketch Comedy
2016	Filthy Rich	Actor – season II, 'Dylan Mayberry'
2017	True Story with Hamish and Andy	Actor – 'Sam'
2017–18	Shortland Street	Actor – 'Jason Kirkpatrick'
2018–22	Wellington Paranormal	Writer, Actor – season I – IV, 'Constable Parker' (recurring)
2019	The Bad Seed	Actor – 'Political Panelist'
2019	Golden Boy	Actor – season I, 'Groundskeeper' (recurring)
2019–22	Educators	Actor – season I – III, 'Rudy Beard' (core cast)
2019–22	Have You Been Paying Attention?	Self – Panelist (regular)
2021–22	7 Days	Self – Panelist and Team Captain
2021	My Life Is Murder	Actor – season I, 'Brett'
2021	The Masked Singer	Self
2021–22	Give Us a Clue	Self – season I & II, Team Captain
2022	Snack Masters	Self – host
2022	The Love Hour	Self – host
2023	Sweet Tooth	Actor – 'Dudley'
2023	Double Parked	Actor – 'Ambo Officer'
2023	Under the Vines	Actor – 'Jeremy'
2024	Taskmaster NZ	Self
2024	Spinal Destination	Writer, Actor – 'Dan'
2024	Guy Montgomery's Guy Mont-Spelling Bee	Self
2025	Warren's Vortex	Writer
2026	Small Town Scandal	Writer, actor

Film

Year	Title	Role
2016	Pork Pie	Actor – 'Bongo'
2016	Waru	Actor – 'Jason'
2017	The Breaker Upperers	Actor – 'Man 1'
2020	Dead	Writer, Actor – 'Dane 'Marbles' Marbeck' (lead role)
2020	Guns Akimbo	Actor – 'Singstar Dude'
2020	Baby Done	Actor – 'Stupid Man'
2021	Nude Tuesday	Actor – 'Commuter'
2023	Loop Track	Director, Writer, Casting, Actor – 'Ian'
2024	The Rule of Jenny Pen	Actor – 'Carer Mike'
