= New Zealand Theatre (TV series) =

- Country of origin: New Zealand
- Original language: English
- No. of seasons: 1
- No. of episodes: 7

Production
- Executive producer: Caterina de Nave
- Running time: 60 minutes

Original release
- Release: October 5 – November 16, 1997

New Zealand Theatre is a 1997 New Zealand anthology television series showing a series of locally produced hour long films. It aired on Sunday nights on TV 1 beginning 5 October. It featured New Zealand stories told by different writers and directors. It began production as part of the series of Montana Sunday Theatre series which had shown international stories. 171 scripts were submitted from which 11 were shortlisted which was whittled down to 7 episodes being produced.

The series started with Highwater where an advertising executive, Michael Hurst as Hugh Chance, is in a rural town to film a commercial and decides to by the local pub. Phil Wakefield in the Evening Post says it's "elements never coalesce as they should and the whole falls short of its considerable parts." The Southland Times' Michael Farrow wrote "I have to say I enjoyed it. That's an admission, because the programme relied on all manner of empty cliches."

The second episode was Home Movie where family drama comes out when friends and family join for a christening. Phil Wakefield in the Evening Post calls it "a stunning dysfunctional family drama" and says "The cast is excellent, the juxtaposition of scenes telling and the locale keenly Kiwi and atmospheric."

Coalface stars Lee Grant as Mumps, a brothel madam. Her brothel is threatened by a local gang, her criminal son arrives and her sister is attacked, spurring her into action. Grant injured herself during production and had to have a hip replacement.

One of Them is set in the 1960s where two schoolboys coping with teenage life are also coming to terms with them both being gay. Both boys are played by 14 year olds in their acting debut.

Nga Wahine is an aptation of Riwia Brown's play of the same name and sees the plays lead actress, Nancy Brunning, repising her role. She plays Daina who get pregnant and is abandonded by her partner.

House of Sticks sees a mother who leaves her abusive husband, taken her two children. When she searches for a new man the daughter is left to care for the sonand she self-destructs. It looks at child abuse, bulimia, and their effects on a family.

In Share the Dream Bosco and Selena work on an assembly line where they fall in love amidst an industrial dispute. The fim also features an appearance from Jock Barnes who took part in the 1951 waterfont dispute. The Southland Times' Michael Farrow took exception to a sex scene in the film and wrote it "was of considerable prurient interest and absolutely no importance. It intruded, in the most distracting way, into what was an important piece of social drama. Here was a story that deserved to help focus debate about the difficult relationships among workers and employers in modern New Zealand."

== Episodes ==
- Highwater

Writer: Steve Sachs. Director: Mark Beesley. Producer: Charlie de Salis

A man from the city buys a rural pub. It stars Michael Hurst, Michael Galvin, Lynda Topp, Katrina Browne and Meryl Main

- Home Movie

Writer: Fiona Samuel. Director: Fiona Samuel. Producer: Owen Hughes

A teenage boy makes a video of a family gathering. Stars Elizabeth McRae, Ian Mune, John Leigh, Geraldine Brophy, Jodie Dorday and Lee Grant.

- Coalface

Writer: Jon Coutts. Director: Greg Stitt. Producer: Trevor Hayson

A brothel madam is in conflict with street kids. Stars Lee Grant, Patrick Wilson, Brenda Simmons and Marise Wipani.

- One of Them

Writer: Peter Wells. Director: Stewart Main. Producer Michele Fantl

Two boys discovering their homosexuality in a homophobic time. Stars Cameron Watt and Ciaran Pennington

- Nga Wahine

Writer: Riwia Brown. Director: Riwia Brown. Producer: Ginette McDonald

The coming together of the lives of two Maori women. Stars Nancy Brunning, Simone Kessell and Kirk Torrance.

- House of Sticks

Writer: Steven Zanoski. Director: Nicky Marshall. Producer: Bruce Sheridan

A look at a lonely teenage girl. Stars Kate Elliott, Patrick Morrison, Michelle Leuthart and Rene Naufahu.

- Share the Dream

Writer: Dean Parker. Director: Mike Smith. Producer: Chris Hampson

A look at what life is like after the introduction of the Employment Contracts Act. Stars Joel Tobeck, Luisa Burgess, Jim Moriarty and Rebecca Hobbs.

== Awards ==
TV Guide Television Awards 1998

- Best Actress: Geraldine Brophy, Home Movie
- Best Actor: Ian Mune, Home Movie
- Best Drama Programme: Owen Hughes, Home Movie
- Best Television Drama Script: Dean Parker, Share the Dream.

Nominations include: One of Them, Best Drama and Best Contribution to Design (Wardrobe, Jane Holland). Home Movie, Best Supporting Actress (Jodie Dorday).
