= Steven Grives =

Australian actor

- Occupation: Actor

Steven Grives is an English actor based in Australia.

Grives made his debut at age 14 on stage at Drury Lane. He went on to feature in The Sandbaggers before getting a lead role in Flambards. After featuring in The Ravelled Thread, Inseminoid and Second Chance he moved to Australia. 1981 saw him as a main cast member in Holiday Island and from 1999 in Beastmaster. In 2003 he was a regular on Fat Cow Motel.

Other screen appearances include The Footstep Man, Super Sleuth, Captain James Cook, Scooby-Doo, Sinbad and the Minotaur and Dangerous Game.

Grives co-produced the film adaptation of The Right-Hand Man and hosted Queensland's Best Living, a property program on Channel 7.

On stage Grives has featured in Hamlet (Northcote Theatre, 1975), Murderer (Karnak Playhouse, 1992), Brazilian Blue (Twelfth Night Theatre, 1995) The Duchess of Malfi (Thomas Dixon Centre Performance Studio, 2005) The Drowning Bride (La Boite's Roundhouse Theatre, 2005), Brave New World Order (Brisbane Powerhouse Visy Theatre, 2003) and Dead Cats Don't Bounce (The Cremorne Theatre, 2009).
