= Super City (TV series) =

- Genre: Comedy
- Created by: Madeleine Sami
- Written by: Madeleine Sami; Tom Sainsbury; Oscar Kightley
- Directed by: Taika Waititi; Oscar Kightley
- Starring: Madeleine Sami
- Country of origin: New Zealand
- Original language: English
- No. of seasons: 2
- No. of episodes: 14

Production
- Producer: Carthew Neal
- Running time: 23 minutes

Original release
- Network: TV3
- Release: 11 February 2011 – 20 September 2013

Super City is a television comedy series from New Zealand starring Madeleine Sami and directed by Taika Waititi. Season 1 premiered on the TV3 network in 2011. The series was picked up by the American Broadcasting Company in 2012. It opened with a 24 percent share of the 25–54 age bracket, placing it 11th place on TV3's rating table for the week. The second season, directed by Oscar Kightley, premiered on 26 July 2013.

== Overview ==
In Season 1, Madeleine Sami transforms into five different characters, all living in Auckland. Pasha is an ageing cheerleader clinging to her partying lifestyle; Azeem is an immigrant taxi driver embracing Maori culture; Jo is a gym instructor in love with her best friend; Linda is the runt of her "old girls" clique fostering impoverished artists; and Georgie is a homeless girl whose freedom is unexpectedly interrupted.

In Season 2, Madeleine transforms into some new characters, including Levi Tutaima, a 20-year-old Niuean who's keen on making his way as a semi-professional rugby star, but is concerned with getting his hair right and fitting in; 26-year-old Ofa Faka'apa'apa, a benefit case-manager who has little sympathy for those who need state help and is always ready to provide unorthodox advice; 45-year-old Mary Dalziel, who, while not on the path to pop stardom anymore, still awkwardly flirts her way around the local covers band scene; and 62-year-old Ray Donaldson, a British panel beater who does his best to teach his immigrant employees while also supporting his bodybuilder wife Tiffany. The second season also features other characters, including Urzila Carlson as Ofa's manager and Elroy Finn as Mary's son.

== Episodes ==
=== Season 1 (2011) ===
Six episodes were first broadcast between 11 February and 25 March 2011.

No.	Title	Original release date
1	"Episode 1"	11 February 2011
An observational comedy starring Madeleine Sami as five very different characters living in one super city.
2	"Episode 2"	18 February 2011
Homeless girl Georgie adapts to being a new mum, Linda finds her tortured young artist, Jo has a new rival at the gym, Pasha shows off her acting abilities, and Azeem struggles to cope with other women.
3	"Episode 3"	25 February 2011
Georgie is loving motherhood, Azeem must find ways of making money, Linda tries to impress with her Polynesian rapper, and Jo reaffirms her heterosexuality.
4	"Episode 4"	4 March 2011
Super City Pasha’s party girl lifestyle takes its toll, Azeem attempts to make Maori friends don't go to plan, Jo is losing her grip as her feelings for Tracy get stronger, Georgie's maternal instincts kick in and Linda is ashamed of her artistic endeavours.
5	"Episode 5"	18 March 2011
Pasha gets pushed to her limits, Georgie fights to keep her baby, Jo’s emotions overtake her, Azeem gets some surprise visitors and Linda gets P Money to help her rapper.
6	"Episode 6"	25 March 2011
Georgie attempts a normal life; Jo comes out; Pasha's party spirit reignites; while Linda goes all-out; and Azeem gets the surprise of a lifetime.

=== Season 2 (2013) ===
No.	Title	Original release date
7	"Episode 1"	26 July 2013
8	"Episode 2"	2 August 2013
9	"Episode 3"	9 August 2013
10	"Episode 4"	16 August 2013
11	"Episode 5"	23 August 2013
12	"Episode 6"	30 August 2013
13	"Episode 7"	6 September 2013
14	"Episode 8"	13 September 2013

== Awards ==
Madeleine Sami won the Best Performance by an Actress at the 2011 Aotearoa Film & Television Awards (previously Qantas TV and Film Award). The series was a finalist in two other categories: Best Comedy and Best Script.

Madeleine Sami and Tom Sainsbury also picked up the Best Comedy Script award for Episode 3 at the 2011 SWANZ awards.
