= Mark II (film) =

1986 New Zealand road film

- Written by: Mitchell Manuel; Mike Walker
- Directed by: John Anderson
- Starring: Nicholas Rogers; Mitchell Manuel; Faifua Amiga
- Music by: Rob Winch
- Original language: English

Production
- Producer: Dan McKirdy
- Cinematography: Rocky Hudson
- Editor: Paul Sutorius
- Running time: 72 min.
- Production company: TVNZ

Original release
- Network: TVNZ
- Release: 1986

Mark II is a 1986 New Zealand made drama written by Mike Walker and directed by John Anderson.

== Synopsis ==
Three Māori youths, friends Eddie, Kingi and Matthew head south from Auckland to Wellington in a two-tone Mark II Ford Zephyr. Two of them were unaware they're being pursued by a van-load of vengeful thugs due to Kingi's drug debts. The writer Mike Walker, describes the film as a "Polynesian Goodbye Pork Pie".

== Cast ==
- Nicholas Rogers as Eddie
- Mitchell Manuel as Kingi
- Faifua Amiga as Matthew
- Joanna Briant as Judy
- Jeff Boyd as Chris
- Jim Moriarty as Rangi
- Riwia Brown as Mary
- Do Kahu as Uncle
- Maria Rogers as Eddie's mother
- Tom Poata as Eddie's father
- Ellen Te Moni as Auntie Nell
- Marise Wipani as Tina
- Kevin Tako as Sniffbag
- Kate Harcourt as Pump attendant
- Bernard Kearns as Judge
- Aileen Davidson as Shopkeeper
- Ray Carroll as Farmer
- Peter Gardiner as Drug heavy
- Greg La Hood as Drug heavy
- Peter Gray as Drug heavy
- Gwynn Amiga
- Jon Brazier
- Eddie Campbell
- Stanley Churn
- Sue Day
- David Douglas
- Robert Fifita
- Keith Hambleton
- Dan Heke
- Arthur Henare
- Jim Hollis
- Vicky Hunwick as Theresa
- Mac Kahu
- Steve Lillyston
- Mary Lochore
- Neville Pascoe
- Donna McLeod
- Sarah Major
- Alex Ranken
- Amilla Ranken
- Joan Reid
- Jascinda Richmond
- Peter Sledmere
- Colin Welsh
- Ross Wilson

== Reviews ==
Barry Shaw of the New Zealand Herald said, Mark II is a testament to his (director John Anderson) belief that the best television drama in New Zealand will come only from our roots, not from transplants from America, Britain or Australia."

The film was recognised at the 1987 Listener GOFTA Awards where it won the Best Single Drama award, and Mitchell Manuel's performance as Kingi won Best Male Performance in a Dramatic Role.
