= Spin Doctors (TV series) =

New Zealand television series

- Created by: Tony Holden
- Written by: Tom Scott; Roger Hall; James Griffin; Tony Holden; Dave Armstrong; Bradford Haami
- Directed by: Tony Holden; Wayne Tourell; Belinda Schmid
- Theme music composer: Peter Blake
- Country of origin: New Zealand
- Original language: English
- No. of seasons: 4
- No. of episodes: 29

Production
- Producer: Tony Holden
- Running time: 30 minutes

Original release
- Network: TVNZ1
- Release: 16 October 2001 – 23 April 2003

Spin Doctors is a New Zealand political satire television series that debuted in 2001. It is a topical series written close to airtime to focus on current events. For the second series scripts where given to actors on Sunday evenings, the episodes were filmed on Mondays and Tuesdays with editing on the second day. It is then finalised on Wednesday and aired that night. It is set in a fictional PR firm O'Connor and Associates. In addition to the regular series there was a one-off Election Special in July 2002.

== Cast ==
- John Sumner as Giles O'Connor
- Michelle Langstone as Melissa Swann
- Kayte Ferguson as Hineroa Kopu
- John Leigh as Kevin Handy
- Elizabeth Hawthorne as Liz Brasch
- Mark Ferguson as Andrew Couch
- Patrick Wilson as Ron "Rooter" Baylis
- Li Ming Hu as Ming Yee

== Reception ==
The show rated around a seven or eight (256,000 to 270,000) in its first two years and was met with mixed reviews.

Commenting on the start of the series Jo McCarroll of the Sunday Star Times said "the first episode of TV One's new satirical comedy simply wasn't very good." On the same episode the Evening Post's Jane Bowron said "Last week's debut of Spin Doctors (9.35 pm, TV One, Tuesday) looks like we could be back in showbiz", adding "at last the country's getting a chance to healthily chuckle at ourselves on a weekly basis." Sarah Daniell, also of the Evening Post, wrote "Lately, Kiwi TV humour has been no laughing matter. This is our best crack at comedy in years."

== Awards ==
- 2002 TV Guide NZ Television Awards
  - Best Comedy Programme - Spin Doctors, Tony Holden (Comedia Pictures) - won
  - Best Script, Comedy - James Griffin, Roger Hall, Tom Scott, Spin Doctors (Comedia Pictures) - nominated
  - Best Director, Comedy - Tony Holden, Spin Doctors (Comedia Pictures) - nominated
- 2003 New Zealand Television Awards
  - Best Comedy Programme - Spin Doctors, series 3, Tony Holden (Comedia Pictures) - won
  - Best Entertainment/Comedy Performance - Spin Doctors, series 3, Elizabeth Hawthorne (Comedia Pictures) - won
  - Best Script, Comedy - Spin Doctors, series 3 , Roger Hall, James Griffin, Dave Armstrong (Comedia Pictures) - won
