= Dangerous Orphans =

1986 New Zealand action film

- Directed by: John Laing
- Written by: Kevin Smith
- Produced by: Don Reynolds; Robin Laing; Campbell Stevenson
- Starring: Peter Stevens; Jennifer Ward-Lealand; Michael Hurst
- Cinematography: Warrick Attewell
- Edited by: Michael Horton
- Music by: Jonathan Crayford
- Production companies: Cinepro; New Zealand Film Commission
- Release date: 1986
- Running time: 87 minutes
- Language: English

Dangerous Orphans is a 1986 New Zealand action film directed by John Laing.

== Synopsis ==
Harry, Moir and Rossi after growing up together orphanage, as adults they pull off the occasional heist together. They plan an international heist to avenge the killing of one of their fathers.

== Cast ==
- Peter Stevens as Harry O'Malley
- Jennifer Ward-Lealand as Teresa Costello
- Michael Hurst as Moir
- Ross Girven as Rossi
- Peter Bland as Jacobs
- Ian Mune as Hanna
- Anzac Wallace as Scanlon
- Grant Tilly as Beck
- Ann Pacey as Mrs. Mooney
- Peter Vere-Jones as Handesman
- Michael Haigh as Dutchman
- Desmond Kelly as O'Malley Senior
- Timothy Lee as Krebs
- Michala Banas as Anna Hanna
- Toby Laing as Young O'Malley
- Alexis Banas as Young Ross
- Eoin Cox as Young Moir
- Miles Tilly as Pope
- Kevin J. Wilson as Inspector Lucas
- Marshall Napier as Hobbes
- Paul Maunder as Felix
- Patrick Smyth as Joe
- Gerry Luhman as Man in New York
- Richard von Sturmer as Short
- Simon O'Connor as Allen
- Mike Knudson as Porter
- Eddie Campbell as Hannas's Goon
- Helen Moulder as Madelaine
- Gerald Bryan as Tom
- John Bach as Desk Sergeant
- Vivienne Plumb as Budgie Woman
- Stephen Gledhill as Budgie Man
- Stephen Judd as Young Policeman
- Donna Akersten as Malvina Jacobs
- Geraldine York as Fashanu
- Michael Horton as Drunken Chef
- Stephanie Ash as Hanna's Girl
- Joanne Mildenhall as Bank Receptionist
- Ruth Hampson as Nun
- Lynette Crawford-Williams as Geneva Secretary
- Roy Wesney as Audience Man
- David Gascoigne as Lucas' Superior
- Tony Hiles as Reporter
- Nigel Hewat as Geneva Cab Driver

== Reviews ==
- 1986 Variety.
