= Lauris Edmond =

New Zealand writer

Lauris Edmond OBE
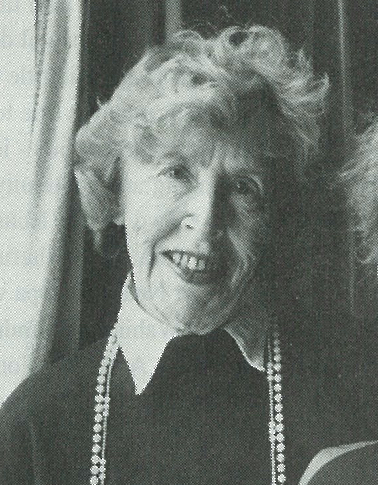
- Edmond in 1993
- Born: Lauris Dorothy Scott; 2 April 1924; Dannevirke, New Zealand
- Died: 28 January 2000 (aged 75); Wellington, New Zealand
- Occupation: Poet
- Children: 6
- Relatives: Martin Edmond (son)
- Writing career
- Notable awards: Katherine Mansfield Menton Fellowship (1981); Commonwealth Poetry Prize (1985); Lilian Ida Smith Award (1987)

Lauris Dorothy Edmond OBE (née Scott, 2 April 1924 – 28 January 2000) was a New Zealand poet and writer.

== Biography ==
Born in Dannevirke, Hawke's Bay, Edmond survived the 1931 Napier earthquake as a child. Trained as a teacher, she raised a family before publishing the poetry she had privately written throughout her life. Following her first book, In Middle Air, written in 1975, she published many volumes of poetry, a novel, an autobiography (Hot October, 1989) and several plays. Her Selected Poems (1984) won the Commonwealth Poetry Prize.

Edmond wrote poetry throughout her life but decided to publish her first collection of verse, In Middle Air, only in 1975, at the age of 51. The work was awarded the PEN Best First Book Award for 1975. She began her editorial activities in 1979, and in 1980 published a selection of poems by Chris Ward. In 1981 she edited the letters of A.R.D. Fairburn (1904–1957), a noted New Zealand poet of an earlier generation. It was a bold move on her part as the writer in question was not known for his progressive views, but the publication established her as an all‑round woman of letters. At the same time she received the Katherine Mansfield Memorial Fellowship, which enabled her to stay in the south of France for several months. Edmond's first work of prose was High Country Weather, a book billed as a novel though in fact an extended short‑story of a deeply biographical character, telling – however veiledly – the story of her own incompatible marriage to Trevor Edmond (1920–1990); it was published in 1984, at about the time of her real‑life marriage's dissolution. The feminist awakening marked by that book was sustained in a collection of other women's 'stories' published under her co‑editorship two years later. As Janet Wilson wrote in The Guardian, "She was friend to several generations of women, especially writers, who admired her as a pioneer for breaking with social convention and carving out a successful literary life at a time when this seemed risky".

In 1985 Edmond won the Commonwealth Poetry Prize for her Selected Poems. The following year, she was appointed an Officer of the Order of the British Empire, for services to poetry, in the 1986 Queen's Birthday Honours. Additionally, in 1987 she received the Lilian Ida Smith Award from PEN New Zealand; in 1988 New Zealand's Massey University awarded her an honorary DLitt degree; and in 1999 she received the A.W. Reed Award for Contribution to New Zealand Literature from Booksellers New Zealand, an industry association in Wellington, New Zealand. After her death a biennial poetry prize was established in her name at the initiative of the Canterbury Poets Collective and the New Zealand Poetry Society, the Lauris Edmond Memorial Award for Poetry, the first prize having been awarded (posthumously) at the Christchurch Arts Festival to the late poet Bill Sewell in 2003.

Her poetry, which continues to influence New Zealand writers, was not all about daffodils; she could speak with a committed voice, as is evidenced in the poem "Nuclear Bomb Test, Mururoa Atoll," which begins:

I am water I am sand
I am a cell in the trembling earth
I am a shaken pebble on the hurt sea floor
a young fish made ill by the predator poison
coursing towards me across the ocean
that was my friend...

Edmond died unexpectedly at her home in Wellington's Oriental Bay on the morning of 28 January 2000. A friend arriving for dinner that evening discovered her body. She was 75, the mother of six children, five of them daughters, one of whom (Rachel, the fourth child) committed suicide in 1975 (the event is dealt with, poetically, in Edmond's poem-sequence Wellington Letter). Her only son, Martin Edmond (b. 1952), is also a writer. The Times of London wrote in her obituary (9 February 2000; p. 23) that she acquired 'a sharp new consciousness of her nationality' through her absence from New Zealand after a year as the Katherine Mansfield Memorial Fellow in Menton in the South of France, ending in 1982.

== Works ==
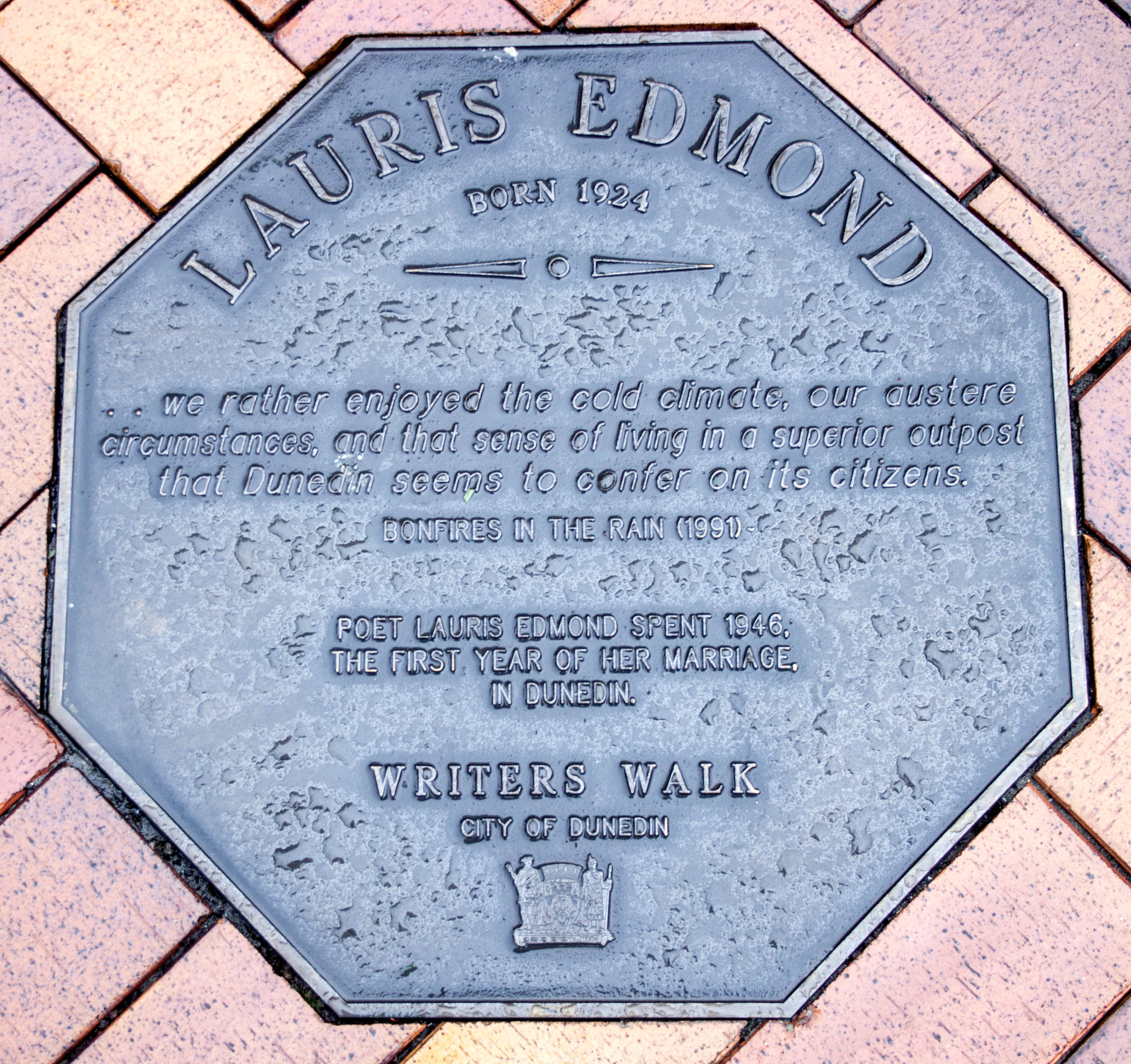
Memorial plaque dedicated to Lauris Edmond in Dunedin, on the Writers' Walk on the Octagon

- In Middle Air (1975)
  - Waterfall
- The Pear Tree: Poems (1977)
- Wellington Letter: A Sequence of Poems (1980)
- Seven: Poems (1980)
- Salt from the North (1980)
- Catching It: Poems (1983)
- Selected Poems (1984)
- High Country Weather (1984)
- Seasons and Creatures (1986)
- Summer near the Arctic Circle (1988)
- Hot October (1989)
- Bonfires in the Rain (1991)
