= Joanna Hartman =

- Neighbours character
- Portrayed by: Emma Harrison
- Duration: 1995–1997
- First appearance: 26 May 1995
- Last appearance: 15 April 1997
- Introduced by: Stanley Walsh
In-universe information
- Other names: Joanna Evans
- Occupation: Co-owner of Anna-Jo Promotions; Aerobics instructor; Co-owner of Chez Chez
- Father: Tony Hartman
- Mother: Caitlin Hartman
- Half-sisters: Annalise Hartman
- Husband: Rob Evans (1996–)
- Stepsons: Conrad Evans

Joanna Evans (also Hartman) is a fictional character from the Australian soap opera Neighbours, played by Emma Harrison. Joanna was introduced as the younger half-sister of established character Annalise Hartman (Kimberley Davies). She made her first on screen appearance on 26 May 1995. Following Davies' departure from Neighbours in 1996, rumours began that Harrison's character would be written out of the show. However, the actress signed a new long-term contract with Neighbours a few months later. In February 1997, producers decided to write Joanna out of the show. A reporter for the Daily Mirror said Harrison was written out due to rows with the producers over her poor acting. Joanna departed on screen on 15 April 1997. In 2005, Harrison was invited to return to Neighbours for the 20th anniversary episode, but she did not appear.

Joanna comes to Erinsborough to meet Annalise and introduce her to their father, Tony (Michael Carman). The sisters display different personalities; Annalise is high maintenance, while Joanna is uncomplicated and down to earth. The author of Neighbours: the first 10 years said Joanna was vacuous and branded her as bright as a glowworm. Writers for the Daily Mirror called her glamorous and said she was as just as stunning as her sister. Joanna and Annalise set up their own public relations company, but their first client turns out to be a con man. Joanna's next job was as an aerobics instructor. She followed this with a stint as co-owner of the Chez Chez bar. Joanna has a brief relationship with her sister's ex-fiancé, Mark Gottlieb (Bruce Samazan), before marrying Rob Evans (Graham Harvey). Joanna splits from Rob for a short time when she realises their marriage is loveless, but she decides to leave Erinsborough to reunite with him.

== Creation and casting ==
When Harrison auditioned for a role on Neighbours, she was unaware the character she was reading for was Annalise Hartman's (Kimberley Davies) long lost sister, Joanna. Harrison told the Daily Mirror: "I was thrilled – and doubly excited when I read the script that had me stealing her TV boyfriend. That was a real bonus." Neighbours marked Harrison's first major television role, following a successful modelling career. She relocated from Queensland to Melbourne for the part. Joanna was introduced as a replacement for Davies' character, but Harrison said she was determined "not to become a Kimberley clone." The actress revealed it took ten months for her to feel comfortable in her new role and she said "When you start in a show like this, where everyone is very busy, you have to make your mark quickly. It's a case of sink or swim." Harrison admitted to being surprised when she received her first fan mail from the UK despite having only appeared on Australian screens for a month. She also admitted that being recognised in public scared her, as she felt unprepared for it. Following Davies' departure from the show, rumours circulated that Harrison would be written out of the show. However, the actress signed a new long-term contract with Neighbours.

== Development ==
=== Characterisation ===
The character's fictional backstory states that she is the daughter of Caitlin and Tony "Tarquin" Hartman (Michael Carman). She grew up in Yallingup. Joanna is made aware of her half-sister, Annalise, by Fiona Hartman (Suzanne Dudley) and she decides to go to Erinsborough to meet her. The BBC said the sister's have very different personalities. Joanna is "uncomplicated", while Annalise is high maintenance. Joanna is also "down to earth" and Annalise becomes jealous of her sister's stable home life. Joanna was more accepting of their father's job as a female impersonator, but Annalise became embarrassed by it. Harrison told Simon Yeaman of The Advertiser that she felt like a "supporting actor" to Davies at the beginning, explaining "She was sort of made to look more heroic and my character was always getting into trouble and stuffing up."

Josephine Monore, author of Neighbours: The First 10 Years, described the character as being "even more vacuous than her blond looks would have you stereotype her. She was dizzy, forgetful and about as bright as a glowworm." Yeaman called the character "naive but nice-natured". While Harrison called Joanna an "underdog" and said she often found herself in trouble, adding that it was like "always being punched in the face a bit." She also told Yeaman that her character was relatable, as she showed that no one is perfect, adding "She's a normal girl, she makes mistakes, she's a bit sort of clumsy and quirky." Fiona Parker of the Daily Mirror said Joanna was "glamorous", while a colleague called her a siren and said she was as "equally-stunning" as her sister.

Tony Johnston, author of Neighbours: 20 Years of Ramsay Street, said Joanna was so "chirpy and over-helpful" that she drove everyone crazy. In a February 1996 interview, Harrison believed that her character had grown up, noting that she was "a very insecure, immature little girl" at the beginning. She also doubted that Joanna would become "a vamp" like her sister. A few months later, Harrison commented on Joanna's development saying "When I started with Neighbours I came in as the little confused sister of Annalise but now Joanna Hartman is developing as a solid confident character." She also said that she and Joanna were complete opposites. Harrison called her character "quite immature" and obsessed with men.

=== Career ===
When Tony gives Joanna and Annalise some money, the sisters decide to set up their own public relations company from their living room. Joanna and Annalise decide to combine their names and they call the company Anna-Jo Promotions. Inside Soap said the name was the best thing about the company. While Joanna has some experience promoting her father's act, Annalise does not know a lot about PR. However, the girls do attract a client, Roger Reynolds (Roger O'Connor), who asks Joanna and Annalise to get him some publicity for his magazine publishing business. Unbeknownst to the girls, Roger is a con man and he manages to cheat them out of everything they have. Inside Soap commented on the situation saying, "An experienced crook like Reynolds can sniff out easy targets like the Hartman sisters a mile away." The police tell the girls what has happened and they go undercover to catch Roger. After Anna-Jo Promotions comes to an end, Joanna takes a job as an aerobics instructor. She is offered the position by the owner of the local fitness centre, Bruce Styles (Paul El Deir), who is impressed by her efforts. Joanna later becomes a co-owner of Chez Chez with Cheryl Stark (Caroline Gillmer), a role which prompted a writer for the Daily Record to comment "Joanna is thrilled to be part of Chez Chez - but proves to be anything but a silent partner."

=== Relationships ===
Joanna begins dating Mark Gottlieb (Bruce Samazan), which displeases Annalise as she was once engaged to him. Joanna becomes obsessed with Mark and he is forced to admit that their relationship is only a fling. Joanna eventually realises that the relationship is going nowhere and ends it. Joanna meets Rob Evans (Graham Harvey), a rich businessman, at an aerobics class. Rob sends Joanna a note and they get to know each other better, they then begin a relationship. Of Joanna and Rob, Harrison told Amanda Ruben of TV Week "It all happens very quickly, but Joanna is really drawn to Rob's energy and she thinks he's gorgeous. I think it's true love. She really does fall head over heels." Joanna considers leaving Australia to work with her father in Asia, but when she realises she is in love with Rob, she turns the job down. Joanna worries about revealing her true feelings to Rob because she ruined her relationship with Mark by moving too quickly. She decides to tell him about the job offer to see if he feels the same way about her, but she starts to feel like she has waited for too long for a reply. A writer for Inside Soap said "Jo's really shocked at Rob's indifference to the thought of her leaving and, in typical Jo style, she breaks down and blurts out all her feelings."

Joanna flees from Rob in tears and prepares to leave and join her father abroad, but she then finds Rob on her doorstep begging for her hand in marriage. Joanna accepts his proposal and she shocks everyone when she reveals she is engaged to Rob after only knowing him for a short time. Joanna's visions of a "rosy future" are shattered when Rob reveals that he has been hiding something from her for a while. He explains that he had a vasectomy and cannot have children. Despite setting her heart on having a family, Joanna stays with Rob and their wedding is "a beautiful, lavish affair", though it does not go without a hitch. The gazebo that is being built for the ceremony is not finished in time and Joanna is not pleased with the dress Danni Stark (Eliza Szonert) has made for her. It is too revealing and not what Joanna wants at all. Joanna and Rob are married on 21 June 1996. Joanna leaves Rob when she realises their marriage is loveless, but she later decides to reunite with him.

=== Departure ===
In February 1997, producers told Harrison they were writing her out of Neighbours. Chris Hughes of the Daily Mirror reported Harrison was written out due to rows with the producers, who claimed her acting was not good enough. A show inside told Hughes, "She was called in to see the bosses and told that her acting was bad. They've always been harsh on models, but she had little ability and the role went to her head. When she started it was suggested she take acting lessons but after a while she stopped. She had decided she didn't need them any more. A lot of us felt she had become a prima donna." In 2005, Harrison was invited back to Neighbours for the 20th anniversary episode, but she did not appear.

== Storylines ==
Joanna arrives in Erinsborough to meet Annalise Hartman. She reveals they are half-sisters, but Annalise does not believe her. She eventually realises Joanna is telling the truth and she tries to accept her. Annalise cancels her trip overseas to stay and get to know her sister. Joanna realises Annalise has not met their father, Tony, and she arranges for them to meet. Annalise is shocked that Tony is a female impersonator called "Tarquin Sequin" and Joanna becomes upset when her sister cannot see past her father's job. She begs Annalise to give him a chance, but Annalise is set against it as Tony had humiliated her in public. Joanna becomes desperate to get them to reconcile, as Tony plans to leave. She succeeds and Annalise makes friends with her father. Joanna then leaves with Tony.

Joanna later returns to Erinsborough to spend more time with Annalise. The sisters become close and after reading an article Libby Kennedy (Kym Valentine) has written about their father, the girls get revenge on her. Joanna and Annalise go into business together and call their company Anna-Jo Promotions. Joanna moves into Number 24 and gets off on the wrong foot with landlady Marlene Kratz (Moya O'Sullivan) and Cody Willis (Peta Brady). Joanna and Annalise's first client turns out to be a criminal and the police ask them to go undercover to catch him. Joanna begins dating Annalise's ex-fiancé, Mark Gottlieb. Joanna worries Mark still has feelings for Annalise, but he convinces her she is the only girl he is interested in. Joanna begins to get obsessed with Mark and her friends became worried for her. When Mark tells her their relationship is just a fling, Joanna breaks down and realises she needs help.

After her relationship with Sam Kratz (Richard Grieve) ends, Annalise leaves Erinsborough for good. Joanna is sad when she is left behind, but she helps Stonefish Rebecchi (Anthony Engelman) get into a Performance Arts course at University and finds employment at the gym as an aerobics instructor. Joanna meets Rob Evans and he employs her as his personal trainer. They begin a relationship and Rob proposes to Joanna. Joanna asks Danni Stark to make her wedding dress, but she is horrified at the result. Joanna becomes difficult and unpleasant to be around and she later realises she has let the wedding plans get on top of her. She asks Danni to make her another dress and she is delighted when Rob arranges for Tony to return for the wedding. Following the wedding, Joanna becomes disappointed in married life. She dislikes Rob going away on business all the time and she decides to become a silent partner in Chez Chez. Rob returns and tells Joanna they are moving to Europe because of his job. Joanna says goodbye to her friends and leaves.

Joanna returns a few months later and announces she and Rob have broken up. Luke Handley (Bernard Curry) allows Joanna to move into Number 30. She goes on a date with Malcolm Kennedy (Benjamin McNair), but he realises they have nothing in common and he tells her he is not interested in pursuing a relationship with her. Lou Carpenter (Tom Oliver) purchases Joanna's shares in Chez Chez and Joanna decides to invest in Debbie Martin's (Marnie Reece-Wilmore) coffee shop. Joanna also turns her attentions to Lou's used car business. Joanna and Rob's love letters are made public and Joanna decides to contact her husband. The next day, Joanna leaves Erinsborough to reunite with Rob.

== Reception ==
At the 1996 Inside Soap Awards, Harrison was nominated for Best Newcomer, while Joanna was nominated for Biggest Bitch in Soap. The BBC said Joanna's most notable moment was "Her marriage to Rob Evans." Matthew Clifton, writing for entertainment website Heckler Spray, included Joanna in his list of "The Best Ever Mid-90s Neighbours Characters". He said "Annalise's mental, annoying sister had really strange facial features and once lived under her desk in Lassiters, like George Costanza in Seinfeld." Sue Malins of the Daily Mirror said Annalise and her "bubbly" sister Joanna turned up the temperature by having relationships with the same man. Andrew Mercado branded Joanna "a blonde-bombshell-in-training." Discussing Joanna and Rob, a reporter from Soap World wrote "these two wed in haste and had lots of ups and downs."
