= Second Hand Wedding =

- Directed by: Paul Murphy
- Written by: Nick Ward and Linda Niccol
- Produced by: Paul Murphy
- Starring: Geraldine Brophy; Patrick Wilson; Holly Shanahan
- Cinematography: Richard Bluck
- Edited by: Michael Horton
- Release date: 7 May 2008
- Country: New Zealand
- Language: English

Second Hand Wedding is a comedy film from New Zealand. It is written by Nick Ward and Linda Niccol and directed by Paul Murphy and was filmed on the Kāpiti Coast.

== Cast ==
- Geraldine Brophy - Jill
- Patrick Wilson - Brian
- Holly Shanahan - Cheryl
- Ryan O'Kane - Stew Davis
- Tina Regtien - Muffy
- John Rowles - Self

== Reception ==
By mid-September 2008 it had grossed over $1.8 million which was at the time the highest grossing New Zealand film of the year.

Peter Galvin from SBS gave the film 2.5 stars writing "This is a fairytale, in 'dag’ vision. It's the kind of movie that begs to be cuddled, not questioned. It wants us to feel good because it's so kind. But kind can be tough, too, and beneath all that affection is a lot of cool calculation." Sydney Morning Herald's Jake Wilson gave it 2.5 stars, saying "this is possibly the daggiest film of the year." The Australian's Evan Williams gave it 2.5 stars writing Murphy has built an amiable, mild-mannered farce, notable for some engaging performances, including a full-blooded turn by Brophy as the golden-hearted but insufferable mother." In The Press Charlie Gates' 3 star review states "It is a cute, folksy comedy that is solidly and competently put together on a low budget and has enough heart to just about see it through."

Ben McEachen, writing in the Sunday Mail, gives it 1.5 stars. He says "Wanting to be New Zealand's answer to The Castle, this low-budget dud is devoid of the stuff you rightly expect of such modest foreign fare."

== Awards ==
New Zealand Film and TV Awards 2008

- Best Actress - Geraldine Brophy - Won
- Best Supporting Actress - Holly Shanahan - Won
- Achievement in Editing in Film - Michael Horton - Nominated
- Achievement in Production Design in Film - Brad Mill - Nominated
