= Constance (1984 film) =

1984 New Zealand film

- Directed by: Bruce Morrison
- Written by: Jonathan Hardy; Bruce Morrison
- Produced by: Larry Parr
- Starring: Donogh Rees; Martin Vaughan; Judie Douglass
- Cinematography: Kevin Hayward
- Edited by: Philip Howe
- Music by: John Charles; Dave Fraser
- Production company: Mirage Films
- Release date: July 1984
- Running time: 104 minutes
- Country: New Zealand
- Language: English

Constance is a 1984 New Zealand film directed by Bruce Morrison.

== Synopsis ==
A young schoolteacher dreams of becoming a movie star. She is asked to pose by a famous photographer, but later with dashed hopes her life degenerates.

== Cast ==
- Donogh Rees as Constance Elsworthy
- Martin Vaughan as Alexander Elsworthy
- Judie Douglass as Sylvia Elsworthy
- Donald MacDonald as John Munroe
- Graham Harvey as Errol Barr
- Mark Wignall as Richard Lewis
- Hester Joyce as Noeline
- Shane Briant as Simon Malyon
- Lee Grant as Mrs. Barr
- Jonathan Hardy as Randolf Grieve
- Elric Hooper as Freddie
- Gay Dean as Lady Bridgewater
- Beryl Te Wiata as Mrs. Mair
- Yvonne Lawley as Mrs. Willard
- Paul Owen-Lowe
- Dai Evans as Bishop Lewis
- Joan Foster as Mrs. Lewis
- Susan Trainor as Naked Lady
- Barbara Doherty as Dancer
- Susan Paterson as Dancer
- Joane Power as Dancer
- Kathryn Lawrence as Dancer
- Kit Surring as Dancer
- Elizabeth Hill as Dancer
- Jules Regal as Organist
- Dana Purkis as Young Constance
- Miranda Pritchard as Jenny West
- Roman Watkins as John Valotta
- Lenore Truscott as Dance Hall Pianist
- Stephen Taylor as Barney
- Mark Hadlow as Errol's Friend
- Lois Haynes as Horsey Deb
- Don Kjestrup as Colonel Barr
- Ellen Phillips as Maid
- Philip Peacock as Randolf's Assistant
- Phillip Rikihana as Sailor
- Frank Mitchell as Minister
- Bill Le Marquand as Lawyer
- Paul Grinder as 50's Man
- Kate Hood as Library Assistant
- Jack Cormack as Butcher
- Noel Appleby as Barman
- Harold Frazer as Bar Singer
- Rod Collison as Policeman 1
- William Kircher as Police Officer
- Michael Cassin
- Spencer Faulkner as Boy on bicycle
- Michael Hurst as Photographer

== Reviews ==
- 2012 Time Out "...the film is lush and exhilarating".

== Awards ==
- 1984 Chicago International Film Festival - Nominee Gold Hugo
- 1984 Taormina International Film Festival - Winner Bronze Charybdis
- 1984 Valladolid International Film Festival - Nominee Golden Spike
