= Kingpin (1985 film) =

1985 film

- Directed by: Mike Walker
- Written by: Mitchell Manuel; Mike Walker
- Produced by: Mike Walker
- Starring: Junior Amiga
- Cinematography: John Toon
- Release date: July 1985
- Running time: 89 minutes
- Country: New Zealand
- Language: English

Kingpin is a 1985 New Zealand drama film directed by Mike Walker. It was filmed at and inspired by the residents of Kohitere Boys Training Centre in Levin, New Zealand, it follows a group of teens who are wards of the state. Mike Walker co-wrote the script with Mitchell Manuel (who also played the part of Rikihana Nathan). It was entered into the 14th Moscow International Film Festival.

== Cast ==
- Junior Amiga as Willie Hoto
- Mitchell Manuel as Riki Nathan
- Nicholas Rogers as Karl Stevens
- Judy McIntosh as Alison Eastwood (as Judith McIntosh)
- Jim Moriarty as Mike Herewini
- Terence Cooper as Dave Adams
- Peter McCauley as Paul Jeffries
- Wi Kuki Kaa as Mr Nathan
- Kevin J. Wilson as Len Crawford

== Reception ==
Helen Martin in New Zealand film, 1912-1996 wrote "The film's raw energy is charged by the spirit of the kids: their music (scored by Schtung musicians Andrew Hagen and Morton Wilson); their talk; their humour; their sensuality and their graceful dance (high-lighted by breakdance champion Niu Satele). The target audience is 12 to 20 and the purpose is to entertain but, while the film is anything but a didactic tract, the political message, that society's systems aren't working for the Centre's inmates, is inescapable."

Costa Botes wrote in the Dominion "It is a positive sign of Walker’s understanding and respect that he doesn’t make up facile excuses for [the inmates of Kohitere]. Tough minded it may be, but the compassion of Kingpin’s outlook is touching too." The New Zealand Herald's Mike Chunn said "Kingpin is a strong, tense, heart-warming film that, while granting the actors sufficient space to develop their characters convincingly, moves at a steady pace," and that it is "a movie that sustains interest, attention and credibility. It should not be ignored." William Dart from Rip It Up noted "Kingpin throws out some intriguing ideas - the idea of a reform school as a microcosm of the larger social group is one - although the film stays well clear of any real analysis of the Maori-Pakeha conflict that lies, unspoken, beneath the surface."
