= The Footstep Man =

- Directed by: Leon Narbey
- Written by: Leon Narbey and Martin Edmond
- Produced by: John Maynard
- Starring: Steven Grives; Jennifer Ward-Lealand
- Cinematography: Allen Guilford
- Edited by: David Coulson
- Music by: Jan Preston
- Release date: 1992
- Running time: 95 min
- Country: New Zealand
- Languages: English, French

The Footstep Man is a New Zealand film released in 1992. It was directed and co-written by Leon Narbey. It depicts a film within a film where foley artist (footstep man) Sam interacts with a character in the film he is working on.

== Cast ==
- Steven Grives as Sam
- Jennifer Ward-Lealand as Mirielle/Sarah
- Michael Hurst as Henri de Toulouse-Lautrec/Michael
- Sarah Smuts-Kennedy as Marcelle
- Rosey Jones as Vida
- Peter Dennett as Jake
- Jorge Quezeda as Riccardo

== Reception ==
Francine Laurendeau from Le Devoir writes "Étonnante surtout cette vision du cméma å travers la bande sonore. Car The Footstep Man est d'abord une réflexion sur l'importance de la bande sonore et sur la sédursante tricherie qu'elle constitue." (Roughly translating to This vision of cinema through the soundtrack is especially astonishing. For The Footstep Man is first and foremost a reflection on the importance of the soundtrack and the seductive deception it constitutes). The Canberra Times' Dougal McDonald says "It's a good story which Narbey handles well". Mark Tierney, writing in Listener, says "The Footstep Man is a difficult film. Its tone of cramped despair is rarely alleviated."

== Awards ==
New Zealand Film and TV Awards 1992

- Best Cinematography - Allen Guilford - won
- Best Film Editing - David Coulson - won
- Best Film - nominated
- Best Director - Leon Narbey - nominated
- Best Screenplay - nominated
- Best Female Performance - Jennifer Ward-Lealand - nominated
- Best Female Supporting Performance - Sarah Smuts-Kennedy - nominated
- Best Male Supporting Performance - Michael Hurst - nominated
