= Casualties of Peace (film) =

- Directed by: Mike Smith
- Written by: Judy Callingham
- Produced by: Mike Smith
- Starring: Judie Douglass; Michael Hurst; Peter Vere-Jones
- Edited by: Mike Bennett
- Release date: April 24, 1983
- Running time: 90 min
- Country: New Zealand
- Language: English

Casualties of Peace is a 1983 New Zealand television film. Set in the 1960s, a soldier from World War Two now works as a farmer. His son comes home from university and is at odds with the father on the dawn parade for ANZAC Day. At the Feltex Awards Judy Callingham was nominated for Best Dramatic Script and Mike Smith was nominated for Best Drama.

== Cast ==
- Judie Douglass as Connie
- Michael Hurst as Peter
- Peter Vere-Jones as Bill

== Reception ==
Ken Strongman in the Press wrote ""Casualties of Peace" contained some tough material which will have upset some viewers. With deftness, Judy Callingham has probed into one of New Zealand's basic values and shown that it has more than one aspect. Of course, the ideas are more parochial, with implications for the general so-called generation gap and for conservatism."
