= Martin Edmond =

New Zealand author and screenplay writer

- Born: 1952 (age 73–74); Ohakune, New Zealand
- Education: Victoria University of Wellington; Western Sydney University
- Occupation: Writer
- Relatives: Lauris Edmond (mother)

Martin Edmond (born 1952 in Ohakune) is a New Zealand author and screenplay writer. He is the son of writer Lauris Edmond.

== Biography ==
Edmond studied Anthropology and English, graduating MA in English from Victoria University of Wellington. He spent a year working as a junior lecturer before joining avant garde theatre group Red Mole, with whom he spent five years as a writer and actor.

He has a Doctorate of Creative Arts from Western Sydney University, with his dissertation on Australian artists Rex Battarbee and Albert Namatjira.

He has lived in Sydney, Australia since 1981. In 2023 he moved to Shinanomachi, Japan.

== Writing career ==
Edmond has written screenplays for several New Zealand feature films, including Illustrious Energy (1987); The Footstep Man (1991) and Terra Nova (1996).

Edmond has written over 20 books. They include Streets of Music (1980), Houses, Days, Skies (1988), The Autobiography of My Father (1992), and The Resurrection of Philip Clairmont (1999). The Autobiography of My Father was nominated for a 1993 Wattie's Book Award, and The Resurrection of Philip Clairmont was a finalist in the 2000 Montana New Zealand Book Awards. Dark Night (2011) is a partial Colin McCahon biography, and was successful in Australia. The Dreaming Land (2015) is a personal tale of a 1950s and 60s childhood in New Zealand. His 2017 book The Expatriates (Bridget Williams Books, ISBN 978-19885-33179) is a history of four extraordinary New Zealanders: Harold Williams, Ronald Syme, John Platts-Mills, and Joe Trapp; Edmond used research material passed on by the late James McNeish. Bus Stops on the Moon: Red Mole Days 1974-1980 about Edmond's experiences with Red Mole was published in 2020 and was longlisted for the 2021 Ockham New Zealand Book Awards for general nonfiction.

Edmond was commissioned to write a history of the Sarjeant Gallery in Whanganui Te Whare o Rehua Sarjeant Gallery: A Whanganui biography which was published in 2024.

In 2025, he published a Japanese travelogue, On the Highway of the Stories of the Gods.

== Awards and honours ==
- 2004 Landfall Essay Competition
- 2005 Montana New Zealand Book Award in Biography for Chronicle of the Unsung
- 2013 Prime Minister's Awards for Literary Achievement
- 2015 Michael King Writers Fellowship
