= About Face (New Zealand TV series) =

- Country of origin: New Zealand
- Original language: English
- No. of seasons: 1
- No. of episodes: 7

Production
- Producers: Bridget Ikin; John Maynard
- Running time: 30 minutes

Original release
- Release: August 10 – September 22, 1986

About Face is a 1986 New Zealand anthology television series. It featured seven half hour films from New Zealand film makers. They were directed by seven different directors who had not directed drama before. Each film was created over a two week shoot and production of the series was completed in 1985. The films premiered at Santa Barbara in February before the series began on One in August, playing on Sunday nights. Another New Zealand short, Rud's Wife, showed in the same slot the next Sunday which NZ on Screen say was arguably the eighth of the series and the Press referred to it as part of the series.

== Episodes ==
- Danny and Raewyn

Writer: Gregor Nicholas, Frank Stark, Anne Kennedy. Director: Gregor Nicholas

A couple is struggling with their marriage. It stars Jennifer Ward-Lealand and Peter Stephens.

- The Lamb of God

Writer: Piers Davies. Director: Costa Botes

Three people, including a butcher, are besieged by sheep who have staged a revolution.

- A Fitting Tribute

Writer: Greg Stitt, Alan Smythe. Director: Greg Stitt

Based on a short story by C. K. Stead, it tells the story of Julian Harp. It stars Lucy Sheehan.

- Jewel's Darl

Writer: Anne Kennedy, Peter Wells. Director: Peter Wells

Adapted from a story by Anne Kennedy that won the 1983 B.N.Z. Katherine Mansfield Short Story Award. A transvestite and a transexual come together for support. Stars Richard Hanna and Georgina Beyer.

- Return Journey

Writer: Shereen Maloney. Director: Shereen Maloney

A mother and daughter grow closer. Stars Mary Regan and Elizabeth McRae.

- Universal Drive

Writer: Debra Daley. Director: Martyn Sanderson

A brother and sister try to cope with a crisis.

- My First Suit

Writer: Peter Wells. Director: Stewart Main

Steve and his estranged parent try to pick out a suit for him, but is his sexuality more important?

- Rud's Wife

Writer: Alison Maclean, Norelle Scott. Director: Alison Maclean

A recently widowed grandmother treats her family to a Sunday roast dinner. Stars Yvonne Lawley.

== Awards ==
Feltex Television Awards 1987

- Best performance, female, dramatic role: Jennifer Ward-Lealand, Danny and Raewyn

Other nominations included Best Drama Series, Best performance, female, dramatic role (both Georgina Beyer and Lucy Sheehan), Best Writing for a Drama (Anne Kennedy and Peter Wells, Jewel's Darl), Director (Peter Wells, Jewel's Darl) and Single Drama Programme (Jewel's Darl).
