= Jennifer Ward-Lealand =

New Zealand actor and director

Jennifer Ward-Lealand CNZM
- Jennifer Ward-Lealand (2026)
- Born: Jennifer Cecily Ward-Lealand; 8 November 1962 (age 64); Wellington, New Zealand
- Occupation: Actor
- Years active: 1978–present
- Spouse: Michael Hurst (m. 1988)
- Children: 2
- Website: jenniferwardlealand.com

Jennifer Cecily Ward-Lealand (born 8 November 1962) is a New Zealand theatre and film actor, director, teacher and intimacy coordinator. She has worked for 40 years, appearing in over 120 theatre performances: Greek, Shakespeare, drama, comedy, devised, and musical theatre. Her screen credits include the 1993 movie Desperate Remedies as well as appearances in The Footstep Man, the soap Shortland Street and Australian comedy series Full Frontal.

== Early life and education ==
Ward-Lealand was born in Wellington, New Zealand, to Philippa "Pippa" Mary (née Ward) and Conrad Ainsley Lealand. She has an older sister, Diana Mary Ward-Pickering and a half brother Simcha Lindt. From the age of seven, after experiencing the buzz of joining the cast of Oedipus at Unity Theatre, Ward-Lealand knew that she wanted to be an actor. At aged 8, she had her first small role in the film Gone up North for Awhile directed by Paul Maunder.

Ward-Lealand's first ongoing television role was as Jan in Close to Home (1978–1980). She sought opportunities to develop her theatre skills with roles at Downstage Theatre's youth programme. After leaving school, Ward-Lealand spent a year touring New Zealand in a community theatre group, The Town and Country Players, performing school and community shows and appearing in Chekhov's one-act play The Bear. When she was seventeen, and ushering at Downstage Theatre, she was inspired to pursue acting by a performance of Metamorphosis directed by Paul Minifie.

After first attending a theatre summer school in Hawkes Bay, run by Auckland's Theatre Corporate, in 1982 Ward-Lealand then moved to Auckland to do a year-long diploma in acting with the company. Paul Minnifie, Judith Gibson, Elizabeth Hawthorne, Elizabeth McRae, Linda Cartwright and Raymond Hawthorne were her main teachers and directors. She credits her training at Theatre Corporate with instilling discipline, fortitude and ensemble experience. Work followed with Theatre Corporate, Centrepoint Theatre and Mercury Theatre. This included a cabaret repertoire of Ward-Lealand performing songs by Irving Berlin, Rodgers and Hart, Stephen Sondheim and Kurt Weill.

== Career ==
Directly after leaving drama school, Ward-Lealand appeared in the short-lived TV drama Seekers and an episode of another New Zealand television series About Face. This tale of working class relationship breakdown would win Ward-Lealand a GOFTA Best Actress Award in 1987. The same year Ward-Lealand made her big screen debut as nightclub singer Costello in Wellington crime thriller Dangerous Orphans.

In 1989 Ward-Lealand joined the music group The Front Lawn and played ukulele and sang backing vocals on the album, "Songs from the Front Lawn". She then went on to perform in the show, "The One that Got Away" throughout New Zealand followed by performances in London, Edinburgh ("Pick of the Fringe), New York, Minneapolis and Philadelphia. In 1990 she played Linda in the short film "Linda's Body" for The Front Lawn and returned to touring "The One that Got Away" to the Melbourne Comedy Festival.

In 1993 she joined the core company of the Australian comedy TV show Full Frontal shooting in Melbourne spending the next two years working on 40 episodes.

Falling in Love Again is Ward-Lealand's Marlene Dietrich cabaret show that came out of Ward-Lealand acting in the play Marlene in 2003. Falling in Love Again has toured New Zealand and in 2018 she toured it to Australia. Her engagement in the cabaret diva genre became a hallmark of her style as a singer. Brel: The Words and Music of Jaques Brel is a 2012 Silo Theatre show with Jacques Brel songs that Ward-Lealand was in along with Julia Deans, Tama Waipara and John Toogood directed by Michael Hurst and Leon Radojkovic. Brel went on to be performed at a few venues around New Zealand finishing at the New Zealand Festival in 2014.

Ward-Lealand's roles in New Zealand plays include Pass it On, The Bach, Via Satellite, The Sex Fiend, Rita and Angus and My Name is Gary Cooper. Through play readings and workshops, she has also supported the development of local scripts, such as Pankhurst in Red by Dean Parker, or Irene in Flour by Briar-Grace Smith (Centrepoint Theatre's 24-Hour Challenge Online).

Jennifer Ward-Lealand Ouisa Kittredge in Six Degrees of Separation Auckland Theatre Company 2019. Directed by Colin McColl

Jennifer Ward-Lealand as Helen Clark - Auckland Theatre Company 2026

Ward-Lealand has acted in roles in Silo Theatre productions, including as Stevie in The Goat or Who is Sylvie by Edward Albee in 2005 and Martha in That Face by Polly Stenham. However, her most extensive repertoire has been programmed by Auckland Theatre Company (ATC), including playing Barbara in the 2010 production of August; Osage County; Ouisa Kitteridge in Six Degrees of Separation, The Witch in Into the Woods, and the 2020 role of Arkadina in Chekhov's The Seagull, directed by Eleanor Bishop and performed fully online due to Covid-19 pandemic restrictions.

Ward-Lealand has made frequent guest appearances in The Basement's Christmas comedies, whether playing Helen Clark or Dame Kiri Te Kanawa. In 2026 Ward-Lealand played the former prime minister of New Zealand Helen Clark in the play Helen Clark in Six Outfits by Fiona Samuel, directed by Sophie Roberts. In a review of Helen Clark in Six Outfits reviewer Lexie Matheson states:

Jennifer Te Atamira Ward-Lealand is simply a national treasure, not to be taken for granted, but a treasure all the same. (Matheson, 2026)

=== Director ===
Ward-Lealand has directed a range of theatre performances, working first in 2002 with Unitec acting students in a production of Big River. Since then, she has directed a range of shows, including A Christmas Carol (2003) for Auckland Theatre Company adapted by Dave Armstrong at Sky City Theatre (2003), the caberet Jaques Brel is Alive and Well and Living in Paris, (Silo Theatre) (2005); Top Girls by Caryl Churchill at Unitec (2008); Tic Tic a comedy by Paul Barrett and Michelanne Forster (2010); Fallout: the Sinking of the Rainbow Warrior with The Large Group (2015); Hudson & Hall Live! for Silo Theatre and that That Bloody Woman by Luke Di Somma and Gregory Cooper (2017 tour).

She has directed the scripts of playwright Aroha Awarau, such as Exclusive in 2020. And in 2021 a collaboration with Awarau and the producer Peata Melbourne to direct the short film Disrupt about drug addiction in Aotearoa, ending with a message of hope and redemption.

=== Arts administration and contributions ===
Ward-Lealand was a founding board member of Watershed Theatre and a co-founder of the Large Group and the drama school, The Actors’ Program. She is a Patron of Q Theatre, Te Manu Tīoriori Trust and serves as a trust board member of The New Zealand Actors Benevolent Fund. An advocate for improving actors' working conditions and pay, Ward-Lealand has been President of Equity New Zealand since 2007. After years as a teacher of the craft of acting, Ward-Lealand began training as an intimacy coordinator in 2018, and has worked on over 60 shows in this role. Her overall aim is to "make actors' lives better" by applying the best practice guidelines of Equity New Zealand. Ward-Lealand is also a patron of Theatre New Zealand, New Zealand's amateur theatre society central body.

Outside of her performing, directing and intimacy work, Ward-Lealand also does speaking engagements, teaching, voiceovers and narrations. What inspires her is to 'work with great people on great projects'.

== Māori language ==
Since 2008, Ward-Lealand has been a student in te reo, the language of New Zealand's indigenous Māori people. Ward-Lealand, who herself is not Māori, started learning the language after not being able to respond to a traditional mihi, or welcome speech. In 2023 she was appointed by Minister Willy Jackson to the board of Te Taura Whiri i Te Reo Māori - The Māori Language Commission for a three-year term.

== Selected filmography ==
Film performances
Year	Title	Role	Notes
1972	Gone Up North for a While	Child	
1985	Dangerous Orphans	Teresa Costello	
1986	Danny and Raewyn	Raewyn	
1990	Linda's Body	Linda	Short film
1992	The Footstep Man	Mirielle	
1993	Desperate Remedies	Dorothea Brook	
1994	A Game with No Rules	Lauren	Short film
1994	I'm So Lonesome I Could Cry	Jane	Short film
1997	The Ugly	Evelyn Cartwright	
1999	I'll Make You Happy	Mel	
2000	The Painted Lady	Fay	Short film
2004	Fracture	Ulla Peet	
2013	End of Daze	Wanda	
2018	Vermilion	Darcy	
2020	Dead	Janine Marbeck	

Television performances
Year	Title	Role	Notes
1978–79	Close to Home	Jan	3 episodes
1986	Seekers	Nardia Alterman	Recurring role (16 episodes)
1990	The Billy T James Show	Raewyn	1 episode
1991	For the Love of Mike	Betty-Sue	1 episode
1993–94	Full Frontal	Various characters	Main cast (40 episodes)
1995	Hercules: The Legendary Journeys	Voluptua	Episode: "All That Glitters"
1996–97	Letter to Blanchy	Jane	3 episodes
1996–98	Shortland Street	Isobel Kearney	Recurring role (60 episodes)
1997	Xena: Warrior Princess	Boadicea	Episode: "The Deliverer"
1999	Xena: Warrior Princess	Zehra	Episode: "The Play's the Thing"
1999	Duggan	Joanne Taylor	2 episodes
2001	Love Mussel	Doctor	Television film
2005	Interrogation	Gail Mary Abbot	Episode: "True Confessions"
2006	Elgar's Enigma: Biography of a Concerto	Narrator	Television documentary (voice role)
2009–13	Buzzy Bee and Friends	Dorable Duck	Voice role (65 episodes)
2009	The Jaquie Brown Diaries	Louise Bouchet	2 episodes
2012–14	Auckland Daze	Wanda	Recurring role (14 episodes)
2013	Sunny Skies	Penny	1 episode
2013	The Almighty Johnsons	Karen	3 episodes
2015–17	Find Me a Maori Bride	Narrator	Voice role (15 episodes)
2015	Newsworthy	Kalonike	1 episode
2016–17	Auckward Love	Barbara	4 episodes
2016	Terry Teo	Barbara Bertinelli	Episode: "Baby Takes a Bullet"
2016	Dirty Laundry	Donna	Recurring role (13 episodes)
2021	The Brokenwood Mysteries	Patricia Wells	Episode: "Exposed to the Light"
2022	My Life Is Murder	Eva Borges	Episode: "It Takes Two"

== Selected stage performances ==
Gifted the title Te Atamira (The Stage), Jennifer Ward-Lealand has been involved in over 120 performances. Refer to her website for student and devised work, play readings, workshops and guest appearances.

Stage performances
Year	Title	Playwright	Role	Director	Producer
1983	King Lear	William Shakespeare	Regan	Roger McGill	Theatre Corporate
1984	Top Girls	Caryl Churchill	Angie and Pope Joan	Sarah Peirse	Theatre Corporate
1984	Cabaret	John Kander, Fred Ebb, Joe Masteroff	Kit Kat Girl	Raymond Hawthorne	Theatre Corporate
1985	Agnes of God	John Pielmeier	Agnes	Sarah Peirse	Theatre Corporate at the Mercury Theatre
1986	The Trojan Women	Euripides	Helen	Sarah Peirse	Theatre Corporate
1986	Pass It On	Renee	Nell	Roger McGill	Theatre Corporate
1986	Hedda Gabler	Henrik Ibsen	Hedda	Colin McColl	Theatre Corporate
1987	Breaking the Silence	Stephen Poliakoff	Eugenia	Alison Quignan	Centrepoint Theatre
1987	Strip	Lorae Parry	Lavinia	Ellie Smith	Centrepoint Theatre and The Depot (Wellington)
1987	The Threepenny Opera	Bertolt Brecht & Kurt Weill	Polly Peachum	Colin McColl	Downstage and Mercury
1988	Nana	Olwen Wymark	Nana	Paul Minifie	Maidement Theatre
1989	A Marvellous Party	Noël Coward	Singer / actor	Raymond Hawthorne	The Gods, Mercury Theatre
1989	The One that Got Away	The Front Lawn	Glenda	with Don McGlashan and Harry Sinclair	From Centrepoint, Palmerston North to Edinburgh Festival 1990
1990	The Threepenny Opera	Bertolt Brecht &l Kurt Weill	Polly Peachum	Michael Hurst	Maidment Theatre
1990	Carousel	Rodgers and Hammerstein	Carrie Pipperidge	Raymond Hawthorne	Mercury Theatre
1990	A Slice of Saturday Night	The Heather Brothers	Frigid Bridget	Paul Minifie	Mercury Theatre
1991	The Sex Fiend	Stephen Sinclair and Danny Mulheron	Eilleen	Chris Scheil	Mercury Theatre
1991	Via Satellite	Antony McCarten	Lyn	Paul Gittens	Mercury Theatre
1991	Follies	Stephen Sondheim	Phyllis Rodgers-Stone	Bob Addisson	Baycourt Theatre
1991	Mad	David Henry Hwang	Renee / Girl	Paul Minifie	Mercury Theatre
1992	Cabaret	Kander/ Ebb / Masteroff	Sally Bowles	Michael Hurst	Watershed Theatre
1992	Twelfth Night	William Shakespeare	Viola	Glen Elston	Adelaide International Festival of the Arts
1993	Exile	Stuart Hoar	Erin Lovelace	Jacqui Dunn	Concert FM Radio Broadcast
1993	Tell Me On a Sunday	Stephen Sondheim	Girl	Cath Cardiff.	Auckland Philharmonia Orchestra
1995	The Rocky Horror Show	Richard O'Brien	Janet	Nigel Triffit	Paul Dainty/Stetson Productions; also toured St James Theatre in Wellington and Christchurch in 1995
1996	Assassins	Stephen Sondheim	Sara Jane Moore/Emma Goldman	Simon Bennett	Watershed Theatre
1998	The Herbal Bed.	Peter Whelan	Susanna Hall	Raymond Hawthorne	Auckland Theatre Company
2000	Into the Woods.	Stephen Sondheim	Witch	Raymond Hawthorne	Auckland Theatre Company
2002	Old Times	Harold Pinter	Anna	Paul Gittins	(potent pause) Productions
2003	The Graduate.	Terry Kohnson	Mrs Braddock	Simon Prast	ATC
2003	Marlene	Pam Gems	Marlene	Ilona Rodgers	(potent pause) Productions, Baycourt Centennial Theatre, Tauranga
2004	The Talented Mr Ripley .	Phyllis Nagy	Emily Greenleaf / Aunt Dottie	Oliver Driver	ATC at The Maidment
2004	The Bach .	Stephen Sinclair	Sally	Sarah Peirse	Auckland Theatre Company
2005	The Goat or Who is Sylvia?	Edward Albee	Stevie Gray	Oliver Driver	Silo Theatre
2006	Twelfth Night .	Shakespeare	Olivia	Michael Hurst	ATC at The Maidment
2006	Berlin Cabaret of Desire	Conceived by John Verryt, Jennifer Ward-Lealand and Paul Barrett	Singer	John Verryt	
2007	Decadence	Steven Berkoff	Helen and Sybil	Paul Gittins	
2007	My Name is Gary Cooper .	Victor Rodger	Connie White	Roy Ward	
2008	The Threepenny Opera	Bertolt Brecht & Kurt Weill	Jenny Diver	Michael Hurst & Grant Winterburn	
2009	Creditors	August Strindberg	Tekla	Paul Gittins, Michael Hurst	
2009	Oliver! .	Lionel Bart	Mrs Sowerberry/ Mrs Bedwin	Raymond Hawthorne	ATC at The Maidment
2010	That Face	Polly Stenham	Mother	Shane Bosher	Silo at Herald Theatre
2010	August: Osage County .	Tracey Letts	Barbara Fordham	Colin McColl	ATC at The Maidment
2010	TOYS	Natalie Medlock and Dan Musgrove	Barbie	Cameron Rhodes/Toby Leach	Royale Productions
2010	Le Sud .	Dave Armstrong	Dominique Le Bons	Raymond Hawthorne	ATC at The Maidment
2011	Poor Boy .	Matt Cameron & Tim Finn	Viv	Raymond Hawthorne, John Gibson – Musical Director	ATC at The Maidment
2011	Rita & Douglas	Dave Armstrong adaptor	Rita Angus	Conrad Newport	Circa One. Performed with Michael Houston. Toured to Queenstown and Lake Wānaka
2012	Copenhagen	Michael Frayn	Margrethe Bohr	Alex Bonham	Northern Lights Theatre Production Company
2013	Red Rabbit, White Rabbit	Nassim Soleimanpour	Solo	Audience interaction	Q Theatre
2013	Between the Sheets	Jordi Mand.	Marion	Sophie Roberts	The Large Group/Royale Productions at The Basement
2014	Brel	Compiled	Singer	Michael Hurst	Silo Theatre
2014	Luncheon	Aroha Awaru	Elsa Lanchester	Katie Wolfe	Basement Theatre
2015	Rupert .	David Williamson	Anna Murdoch / Pat Murdoch / Rebekah Brooks	Colin McColl	ATC
2015	Lysistrata .	Aristophanes	Kalonike	Michael Hurst	ATC at the Q Theatre
2016	The Book of Everything	adapted by Richard Tulloch from a book by Guus Kuijer	Auntie Pie	Sophie Roberts	Silo Theatre at Q Theatre then on tour to Hamilton, Napier, Palmerston North and New Plymouth,
2018	Mrs Warren's Profession .	G B Shaw	Mrs Warren	Eleanor Bishop	ATC at the ASB Waterfront
2019	Six Degrees of Separation .	John Guare	Ouisa	Colin McColl	ATC at the ASB Waterfront
2019	The Blind Date Project	Bojana Novakovic & Mark Winter with Thomas Henning & Tanya Goldberg	Adele	Sophie Roberts	Silo Theatre
2020	Chekhov's The Seagull .	Eli Kent & Eleanor Bishop	Arkadina	Eleanor Bishop	ATC on Stage Screen; online zoom of 4 half hour sessions
2021	Two Ladies .	Nancy Harris	Helene	Colin McColl	ATC at the ASB Waterfront
2022	The Unruly Tourists	Luke di Soma with librettists: Livi Rehana & Amanda Kennedy	Barbara Doran	Thomas de Mallet Burgess	NZ Opera

== Accolades ==
Ward-Lealand won the 1987 GOFTA Award (New Zealand film and television award) for Best performance, female, dramatic role for Danny and Raewyn.

Ward-Lealand's contribution to New Zealand theatre was recognised in 2007 New Year Honours with her investiture as an Officer of the New Zealand Order of Merit, for services to theatre and the community.

In 2017 Ward-Lealand was gifted the name Te Atamira (The Stage) by Sir Tīmoti Kāretu and the late Prof Te Wharehuia Milroy.

In October 2018 she was presented with a Scroll of Honour from the Variety Artists Club of New Zealand for her contribution to New Zealand entertainment.

Ward-Lealand receiving New Year Honours with the Governor General of New Zealand

In 2019 an Award of Excellence as an Actress in the Accolade Global Film Competitions. She was appointed a Companion of the New Zealand Order of Merit, for services to theatre, film and television and for her advocacy for actors' working conditions and pay in the 2019 New Year Honours, and in the same year won the New Zealand Women of Influence Award in the Arts and Culture section.

In 2020 she was awarded Centennial Award for International Women's Day by the Zonta Club of Auckland and E Tū Unionist of the Year (with Marianne Bishop). Ward-Lealand won the New Zealander of the Year Award in 2020, being recognised for her dedication to performing arts and her commitment and passion for te reo Māori.

== Personal life ==
Since 1988 Ward-Lealand has been married to actor Michael Hurst of Hercules: The Legendary Journeys fame. They met at Theatre Corporate in 1983, then performed in 22 shows together, before their two sons were born in 1997 and 1999. The sons follow 'family tradition' by working in film and music production.
