= Mitchell Manuel =

New Zealand actor

- Occupation: Actor
- Notable work: Kingi's Story; Kingpin; Mark II

Mitchell Manuel is a New Zealand actor and screenwriter. Manuel first starred as Kingi in Kingi's Story which aired on One on 23 May 1982. Directed, written and produced by Mike Walker, it was based on the experiences of residents of Kohitere Boys Training Centre, where Manuel was a "ward of the state". Walker and Manuel co-wrote a sequel titled Kingpin that was released into cinemas in 1985. Manuel played a lead role of Riki Nathan. Mark II, a telefeature, followed. He co wrote it with Walker and played Kingi.

Manuel move into art. He exhibited in Scotland with work that celebrated his Scottish and Māori heritage.

== Awards ==
1987 GOFTA Awards

- Best Performance, male, dramatic role - Mark II - won
- Best Writer, drama: Mark II (with Mike Walker) - nominated
