= Mike Walker (film maker) =

New Zealand filmmaker

- Born: New Zealand
- Died: 2004 (aged 71–72); Palmerston North, New Zealand
- Occupation: Filmmaker

Mike Walker (1932-2004) was a New Zealand filmmaker. He is known for Kingi's Story (1981), Kingpin (1985) and Mark II (1986).

Walker and Bob Morrow, working as Morrow Productions Ltd made animated cartoons in the 1950s.

While working at Kohitere Boys' Training Centre Wlker wrote a film based on the experiences of some of the boys incarcerated there. With Walker directing and producing it was filmed as Kingi's Story which aired on One on 23 May 1982 and starred Mitchell Manuel. Walker and Manuel co-wrote a sequel which Walker directed and co-produced. Titled Kingpin, it was released into cinemas in 1985. Mark II, a telefeature, followed. He co wrote it with Manuel and worked with director John Anderson and script editor Rachel Lang to get the project made.

== Awards ==
1987 GOFTA Awards

- Best Single Drama Programme: Mark II - won
- Best Writer, Drama: Mark II (with Mitchell Manuel) - nominated
