= Marise Wipani =

New Zealand actress (1964–2025)

- Born: Marise Gael Wipani; 6 June 1964; New Zealand
- Died: 6 June 2025 (aged 61)
- Occupations: Actor, television presenter

Marise Gael Wipani (6 June 1964 – 6 June 2025) was a New Zealand actress and presenter. She was known for her appearances on television shows such as Shortland Street, Xena: Warrior Princess, Street Legal, Rude Awakenings, and Soldier Soldier. Early in her career, she also co-hosted the first live televised Lotto New Zealand draw alongside Doug Harvey, and was affectionately referred to as the "Lotto Lady".

In addition to television, Wipani played minor roles in several films including Came a Hot Friday (1985), Mark II (1986), Grievous Bodily Harm (1988), Hercules in the Maze of the Minotaur (1994), Bonjour Timothy (1995), Channelling Baby (1999), and Jubilee (2000).

Wipani's career began when she was scouted at a photography studio and invited to join the Miss New Zealand competition, which would then send the winner to represent at Miss Universe 1983. Wipani came runner-up, but in the following years, began working in television in a supporting role on the Billy T. James Show. In 1985, she was cast in Came a Hot Friday.

In 1987, Wipani became one of the first presenters of the live televised draw for Lotto New Zealand. She continued with acting work, and left the presenting role in 1991 to pursue acting full time. During the 1990s and early 2000s, Wipani appeared in roles in a number of shows including Soldier Soldier, the Hercules franchise, Xena: Warrior Princess, and in Shortland Street as Morgana (which she would return to in 2008 as Rebecca Scott). She was also involved in film, mainly playing minor roles in Australasian films.

In her later years, Wipani worked in small productions and hospitality, and chose to live a quieter life to look after her late mother. She died on her birthday in 2025, aged 61. A close friend reported Wipani had breast cancer at the time of her death.

== Background ==
Wipani lived in Ponsonby in her teens, and moved to Christchurch as a young adult.

In the 2010s, Wipani worked in small production roles, but also worked in a cafe and an office for a time, and was living modestly. She decided to live a quieter life to look after her late mother.

Wipani died on 6 June 2025, her 61st birthday, surrounded by family and friends. A cause of death was not released, however a close friend reported Wipani had breast cancer. Her death prompted tributes from fellow actors, including Ian Mune and Jay Laga'aia. Lotto New Zealand also paid tribute on their subsequent televised broadcast.

== Career ==
=== 1983–1985: Early career and Came a Hot Friday ===
While in a photography studio in Ponsonby, Wipani was spotted by the Miss New Zealand pageant producer, who encouraged her to participate. Wipani didn't know much about the competition, but accepted the offer and flew to Christchurch. She became friends with some of the other contestants including Lorraine Downes, who would be selected and go on to win the 1983 Miss Universe competition. Wipani won runner-up.

In the mid-1980s, Wipani was cast to play various characters on the Billy T. James Show. In 1985, she was cast for the role of Esmerelda in Ian Mune's Came a Hot Friday, a film also starring James.

=== 1986–1993: Lotto and continued acting ===
In 1986, Wipani appeared in the film Mark II and became the host of the televised draw for Lotto New Zealand. She appeared on the first ever live broadcast in 1987 alongside Doug Harvey. She became affectionately known as the "Lotto Lady". She stayed in the role until 1991, leaving to pursue acting full time, although briefly held a presenter role on the children's TV show YaHoo in 1992.

In 1988, Wipani played the role of Suzie in the Australian crime film Grievous Bodily Harm. In 1991, she appeared in Rafferty's Rules, and in 1993, she was in two episodes of Soldier Soldier.

=== 1994–2000: Hercules, Shortland Street and Street Legal ===
In the mid-90s, Wipani took up a role on Shortland Street as Morgana. She appeared in the film Hercules in the Maze of the Minotaur and the series Hercules: The Legendary Journeys, as well as an episode of One West Waikiki and Letter to Blancy. Wipani also played a minor role in Bonjour Timothy (1995), and in Channelling Baby (1999) and Jubilee (2000). In 2000, she played Anna Kerepu in several episodes of Street Legal.

=== 2001–2008: Xena: Warrior Princess and Rude Awakenings ===
In 2001, Wipani played Kanae in Xena: Warrior Princess. In 2007, she played Sharon Short in series 1 of Rude Awakenings. In 2008, she returned to Shortland Street as a new character, Rebecca Scott.

== Filmography ==
=== Film ===
Year	Title	Role	Notes
1985	Came a Hot Friday	Esmerelda	
1986	Mark II	Tina	TV movie
1988	Grievous Bodily Harm	Suzie	
1994	Hercules in the Maze of the Minotaur	Maiden	TV movie
1995	Bonjour Timothy	Airport attendant	
1999	Channelling Baby	Birth doctor	
2000	Jubilee	Sharyn	

=== Television ===
Year	Title	Role	Notes
1985–1986	The Billy T. James Show	Various	
1987–1991	Lotto	Presenter	Televised draws
1987	Steel Riders	Detective Sergeant Flett	
1989	G.P.		"Toss a Coin"
1991	Rafferty's Rules	Amanda Medhurt	
1992	YaHoo	Presenter	
1993	Soldier Soldier	Ellie	
1993–1995	Shortland Street	Morgana	
1995	Hercules: The Legendary Journeys	Janista	
1996	One West Waikiki	Clerk	
1997	Letter to Blanchy	Cop	
1997	Coalface	Nola	
2000	Street Legal	Anna Kerepu	
2000	Today Live	Herself	Interview w/ Susan Wood
2001	Xena: Warrior Princess	Kanae	
2007	Rude Awakenings	Sharon Short	
2008-2009	Shortland Street	Rebecca Scott	Returned as new character
