= Murderer (play) =

Murderer is a dark, twisting, comedy thriller, written by Anthony Shaffer. The play is in two acts, and takes place in Norman Bartholomew's home in a small village in Dorset, England. Norman's interest of re-enacting famous murders, which involve his girlfriend Millie, and tired wife, Elizabeth, cause suspicion with the police, and soon Sergeant Stenning and Norman are in a game of wits and murder.

== Plot summary ==
Norman Bartholomew, a painter with a dark obsession, meticulously plans and executes the murder of his subject, Millie Sykes. He strangles her, dismembers her body, and disposes of the remains in his stove, all while maintaining an eerie calm.

When Sergeant Stenning arrives to investigate a neighbour's report, Norman engages in a psychological game, deflecting suspicion with dark humour and odd behaviour. Sergeant Stenning conducts a search of the house and finds a smouldering head in the wood burner stove. Quickly realising the head is a fake, he demands an explanation. Norman reveals his hobby of re-enacting famous murder cases, claiming it's all part of experiencing the thrill of being a murder suspect.

Norman and Millie, who we learn has been a willing victim in Noman's game, perform disturbing theatrical scenarios in front of Sergeant Stenning, leaving him frustrated and confused. He tries, without success, to warn them of the games they are playing, and leaves the house to put the neighbour's mind at ease.

However, we learn the game Norman had set up for Sergeant Stenning was part of his true intentions: to murder his wife, Elizabeth.

Elizabeth arrives home early to find Norman with Millie and confronts him about his affair, revealing to Millie that she knows about Norman's role-playing and fantasies of murder, and the other women he has been seeing. Millie leaves, upset that Norman had been using her.

As tensions rise, Norman and Elizabeth engage in a dangerous game of cat and mouse, with each trying to outsmart the other. The situation escalates, and Norman attempts to carry out his murderous plan.

Just when it seems Norman has succeeded, Sergeant Stenning returns unexpectedly, and the atmosphere grows thick with suspicion as the plot rapidly moves in new directions and the characters' true motives and actions come to light.

== Production ==
Murderer opened at the Theatre Royal, Brighton on 11 February 1975 before moving on to the Theatre Royal, Newcastle (24 February - 1 March) and the Lyceum Theatre, Edinburgh (3 - 8 March) before finally transferring to the Garrick Theatre, London on 12 March, where it played until 19 July 1975.

Cast:

Norman Bartholomew	Robert Stephens
Millie Sykes	Patricia Quinn
Sergeant Stenning	Warren Clarke
Elizabeth Bartholomew	Caroline Blakiston

Director: Clifford Williams

Design: Carl Toms

== Other productions ==
Shaffer wrote several versions of Murderer over the years, each having different scenes and endings, though the premise of Norman planning to kill his wife remains in each. He also wrote a new version which was presented at the Karnak Playhouse Theatre in the grounds of Karnak, the home he shared with Diane Cilento in North Queensland, Australia. This production was part of the opening ceremony of the Karnak Playhouse on 9 August 1992, though the actual opening was on the previous night, itself a glamorous occasion with music, dancers and other live performance. Murderer was a special presentation for the invited audience and had been adapted for the occasion.

The play ran from 9 August - 6 September 1992.

Cast:

Norman Bartholomew	John Stanton
Millie Sykes	Justine Clarke
Sergeant Stenning	Steven Grives
Elizabeth Bartholomew	Jane Harders

Director: Diane Cilento

Design: James Ridewood

A brief revival saw Murderer play at the Menier Chocolate Factory in Southwark, London from 10 November 2004 – 22 January 2005, with Les Dennis taking the lead role of Norman Bartholomew.

Cast:

Norman Bartholomew	Les Dennis
Millie Sykes	Lisa Kay
Sergeant Stenning	George Potts
Elizabeth Bartholomew	Caroline Langrishe

Director: Adam Speers

Design: Simon Scullion
