= Judie Douglass =

New Zealand actress

- Born: New Zealand
- Occupation: Actress

Judie Douglass is a New Zealand actress. She won the 1977 Feltex Television Awards for Best Actress for her role in The God Boy.

Douglass screen roles include Sister Angela in The God Boy, Moynihan's wife the TV series Moynihan, Connie in Casualties of Peace, the Mother, Sylvia, in Constance and Gertrude Tell in Porters,

Douglass has a long stage career including The One Day of the Year (1965, The Court Theatre), The House of Bernada Alba (1966, Sunday Night Theatre Club ), Annie Wobbler (1985, The Court Theatre), Lettice and Lovage (1988, The Court Theatre), Conjugal Rites (1990, The Court Theatre), In 1981 she toured Australia and New Zealand with Blood of the Lamb.

Douglass's acting also featured on radio, such as A Victim of Circumstances on Radio New Zealand in 1976.
