= Dead (film) =

2020 New Zealand comedy horror film

- Directed by: Hayden J. Weal
- Written by: Tom Sainsbury; Hayden J. Weal
- Produced by: Rob Malloch; Nicole van Heerden; Hayden J. Weal
- Starring: Tom Sainsbury; Hayden J. Weal
- Cinematography: Tammy Williams
- Edited by: Kerri Roggio
- Music by: Tom McLeod; William Philipson; Jimmy Urine; Tom Pierard
- Release date: 7 August 2020
- Running time: 90 minutes
- Country: New Zealand
- Language: English

Dead is a 2020 New Zealand comedy horror film, written by and starring Tom Sainsbury and Hayden J. Weal.

== Plot ==
Dane 'Marbles' Marbeck can see ghosts with the help of a homemade drug. While out on his day job of connecting people with their deceased loved ones, he's confronted by a freshly dead cop, Officer Jayson Tagg, who wants help hunting his killer.

== Cast ==
- Tom Sainsbury as Dane 'Marbles' Marbeck
- Hayden J. Weal as Officer Jayson Tagg
- Tōmairangi Ihaia as Yana Tagg
- Jess Sayer as The Hoodie/Henna
- Kayne Ngatokowha Peters as Xavier
- Jennifer Ward-Lealand as Janine Marbeck
- Michael Hurst as Ross Marbeck
- Cameron Rhodes as Lloyd Llewellyn

== Production ==
The script was co-written by Sainsbury and Weal, with both also performing the two lead roles. Weal also directed and co-produced the film. It was shot over four weeks with a budget of $41,000.

== Release ==
The film was released in New Zealand in August 2020, and internationally on 6 October 2020.

The film was later released as an eight-part web series. In New Zealand, the series is available to view on TVNZ's free-to-air streaming service TVNZ+.

== Reception ==
Kate Rodger of Newshub praised the film, stating that it had great performances and a cracking script. Rodger wrote that Dead "was, in fact, full of life, and death and was an unexpected delight" and gave it four out of five stars. Writing for Stuff, reviewer James Croot stated although there were some inspired moments, "Dead’s combination of the supernatural and silly behaviour just felt a little too forced," and rated the film three stars. Cath Clarke of the Guardian gave it 2 stars and says "Dead loses its way completely in the last 30 minutes, when the plot takes a turn for the mega bonkers – either the writers have consumed a large quantity of Marble’s trippy formula or have simply run out of decent ideas to stretch their sitcommy idea into a 90-minute film."

Simon Morris from RNZ's At The Movies says "The good things about Dead are it’s well executed, and many of the performances are rather good – even strangely moving at times. But it does get a bit exhausting if you’re not in the mood and feels rather longer than its modest 90-minute length." In the Austin Chronicle Richard Whittaker gives it 2 stars and writes "It’s not that Dead is unfunny – it’s just not consistently funny enough. The jokes don’t always land, and sometimes they’re on-the-nose, like Marbles and Tagg taking about possession as a way to be inside each other. That’s where Dead really feels like a lost opportunity, and occasionally veers into the uncomfortable."

On review aggregator website Rotten Tomatoes, the film holds an approval rating of 88% based on 16 reviews, with an average rating of 6.4 out of 10.
