= Rude Awakenings =

- Created by: Garth Maxwell; Stephanie Johnson; Fiona Samuel
- Developed by: Television New Zealand
- Country of origin: New Zealand
- No. of episodes: 11

Production
- Executive producer: Michele Fantl
- Production company: M.F Films

Original release
- Network: TV One
- Release: 9 February – 20 April 2007

Rude Awakenings is a New Zealand comedy-drama television series, which originally aired on TV One on Friday evenings. The first episode aired on 9 February 2007. By March it was averaging almost 320,000 viewers.

The series centres on two families who live next door to each other in a fashionable street in Ponsonby, a suburb of Auckland. The Rush family has just moved to their newly renovated house in Ponsonby from a lifestyle block in Kumeu. Dimity, the mother, is a human resources manager; Stuart, the father, is an anaesthetist, and Julian and Ollie are their sons. They immediately hit a wrong chord with their new neighbours, the Short family.

Arthur Short has recently had his wife Sharon leave him for a lesbian relationship, and he is unemployed and with few prospects. His two teenage daughters, Amber and Constance, live with him. Their house, where they have been tenants for the last 20 years, is up for sale, but they are determined to remain where they are.

The series has been released to DVD.

== Cast and characters ==
- Danielle Cormack as Dimity Rush
- Carl Bland as Stuart Rush
- Jaxin Hall as Julian Rush
- Mark Davies as Ollie Rush
- Patrick Wilson as Arthur Short
- Hannah Tasker-Poland as Amber Short
- Rose McIver as Constance Short
- Marise Wipani as Sharon Short
- William Walker as Ralph Gubb
- Fiona Samuel as Bonnie Buckley
- David Mackie as Jase Buckley
- Hera Dunleavy as Dara
- Peter Feeney as Spencer Fantl
- Michael Lawrence as Michael "Horse" Grieve
- Gene Hollins-Werry as Max Buckley
- Madeleine Sami as Francesca Hoyle
