= Peter Wells (writer) =

New Zealand writer and filmmaker (1950–2019)

Peter Wells MNZM
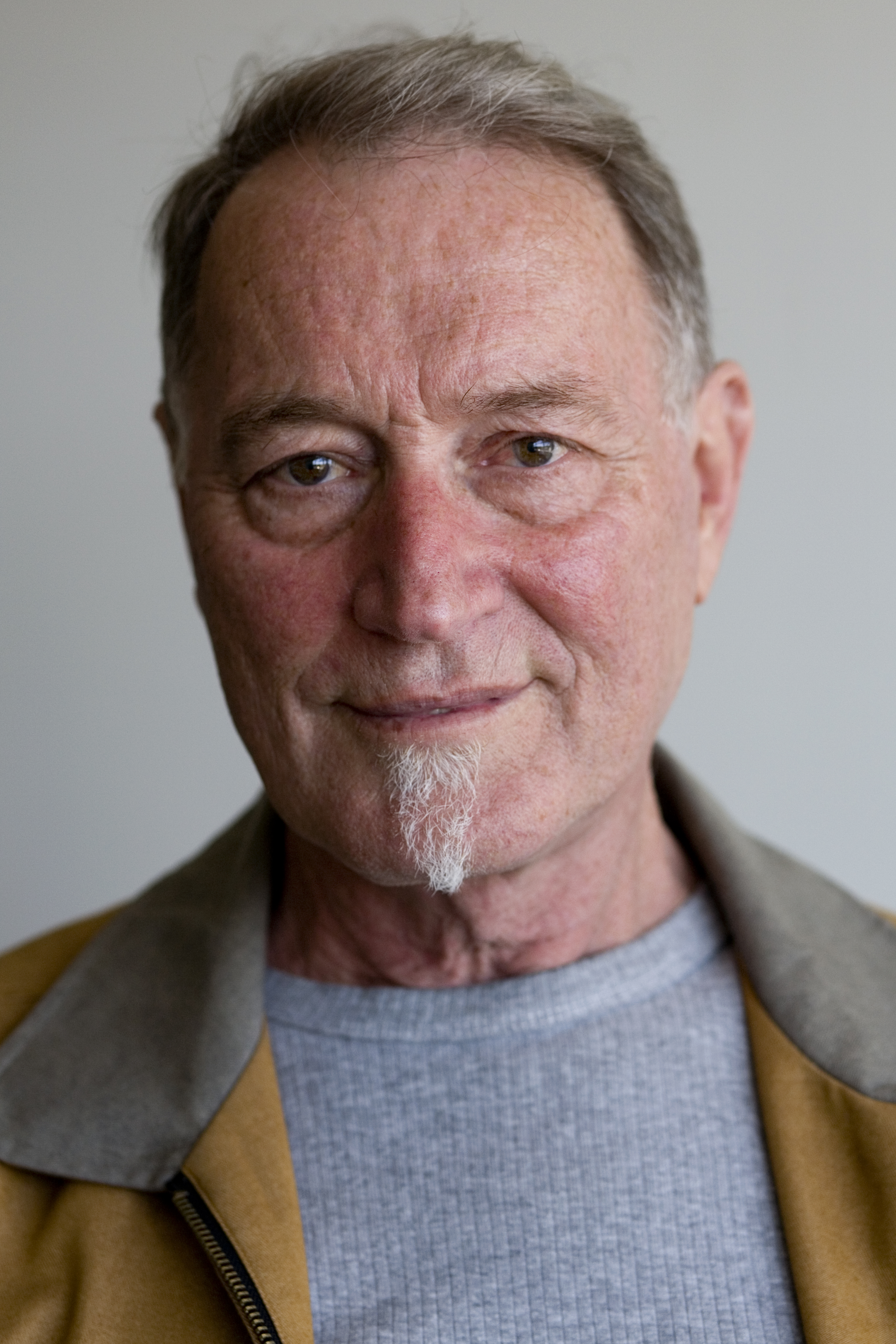
- Wells in 2013
- Born: Peter Northe Wells; 8 February 1950
- Died: 18 February 2019 (aged 69); Auckland, New Zealand
- Writing career
- Notable awards: Member of the New Zealand Order of Merit
- Website: www.peterwellsblog.com

Peter Northe Wells MNZM (8 February 1950 – 18 February 2019) was a New Zealand writer, filmmaker, and historian. He was mainly known for his fiction, but also explored his interest in gay and historical themes in a number of expressive drama and documentary films from the 1980s onwards.

== Career ==
=== Film ===
Wells's first feature film was Desperate Remedies (1993), co-directed with Stewart Main. This take on New Zealand's colonial beginnings was selected to screen at the Cannes Film Festival, and represented an expressionistic alternative to the "man alone" machismo that dominated New Zealand film in the 1970s and 80s.

=== Writing ===
In the years that followed, Wells concentrated on developing his writing career. His short stories and novels have been widely praised. In 1996 he collaborated with theatre director Colin McColl on an operatic dramatization of Katherine Mansfield's Wellington stories, commissioned for the NZ International Festival of the Arts. Two short stories from his 1991 collection Dangerous Desires have been filmed to date: Of Memory & Desire, the tale of a Japanese couple travelling around New Zealand, was adapted by Niki Caro as her first feature film in 1997. The same year, working from a Wells script, Stewart Main directed 1960s coming of age story One of Them! as an hour-long short.

In 1998, with Stephanie Johnson, he founded the Auckland Writers Festival, and in 2016 he founded a festival to promote LGBTQI writers called same same but different (ssbd) which includes an annual prize The Peter Wells Writing Award.

=== Honours and awards ===
Wells's 2003 novel Iridescence was a runner-up in the fiction category of the Montana New Zealand Book Awards and a finalist in the 2005 Tasmania Pacific Fiction Prize. In the 2006 New Year Honours, Wells was appointed a Member of the New Zealand Order of Merit, for services to literature and film. He was awarded the Michael King Fellowship in 2011.

In 2009 Wells was awarded a New Zealand non-fiction literary prize, convened by CLL (Copyright Licensing Ltd) to write a series of biographical essays on William Colenso, entitled The Hungry Heart. The book was anticipated to "not be a conventional biography, but an essay series that bears directly on the episodes of heartbreak, loneliness, and sometimes horror that chequered the life of this gifted renaissance man – printer, writer, botanist, explorer, ex-missionary and intellectual maverick". The book was published in 2011. Journalist Geoffrey Vine, reviewing the book for the Otago Daily Times, wrote that it had "set a new standard in the writing of New Zealand history and Wells deserves every accolade".

== Personal life ==
Wells, who was gay, was married to the writer Douglas Lloyd Jenkins. Wells died from prostate cancer at Mercy Hospice in Auckland on 18 February 2019.

== Works ==
=== Bibliography ===
- Dangerous Desires. Reed Books. 1991. ISBN 9780790002415. OCLC 939604844.
  - Short story collection. Won 1992 NZ Book Award for Fiction and 1992 PEN (NZ) Best First Book in Prose Award.
  - The feature film Memory and Desire (1997) directed by Niki Caro, was based on Wells' short story "Of Memory and Desire" in this collection.
- The Duration of a Kiss. Secker & Warburg. 1994. ISBN 9780790003580. OCLC 939607402.
- Boy Overboard. Vintage. 1997. ISBN 9781869413194. OCLC 38048570.
- One of them!. Vintage. 1997. ISBN 9781869413354. OCLC 38587195.
- Best Mates: Gay Writing in Aotearoa New Zealand (1997) Edited by Peter Wells and Rex Pilgrim. Auckland: Reed
- Frock Attack! Wig Wars!: Strategic Camp in Desperate Remedies (1997) Auckland: Centre for Film, Television and Media Studies, University of Auckland
- Long Loop Home: a memoir (2001) Auckland: Vintage. Won the Biography Category of the 2002 Montana NZ Book Awards
- Iridescence (2003) Auckland: Vintage. Runner-up for the 2004 Deutz Medal for Fiction and shortlisted for the Tasmania Pacific Fiction Prize 2005
- On Going to the Movies (2005) Series editor Lloyd Jones. Wellington: Four Winds Press
- The Cat's Whiskers: New Zealand Writers on Cats (2005) Edited by Peter Wells. Auckland: Vintage
- Lucky Bastard (2007) Auckland: Random House
- The Hungry Heart: Journeys with William Colenso (2011) Auckland: Vintage/Random House
- Little Joker Sings (2013) Auckland: Random House
- Journey to a Hanging (2014) Auckland: Random House
- Dear Oliver: Uncovering a Pākehā History (2018) Massey University Press

=== Filmography and videography ===
- Foolish Things (1980)
- Little Queen (1984)
- Jewel's Darl (1985)
- My First Suit (1985)
- Newest City on the Globe: Art Deco Napier (1985). Auckland: Moving Image Centre.
- Newest City on the Globe (1985). Written and directed by Peter Wells. Produced and edited by Stewart Main. Auckland: TVNZ.
- A Death in the Family. Film for television with Stewart Main.
- Drama on Film. Wellington: New Zealand Film Commission.
- The Mighty Civic (1988) Documentary co-directed by Wells and Stewart Main. Wellington: New Zealand Film Commission.
- A Taste of Kiwi (1990)
- Desperate Remedies (1993). Written by Wells and co-directed by Wells and Main. Isambard Productions.
- Naughty Little Peeptoe, with Garth Maxwell.
- One of Them Written by Wells and directed by Main.
- Georgie Girl (2001)

=== Installations ===
- Temples of Wonder Installation at the Hawkes Bay Museum, Napier.
