= Love Mussel =

- Directed by: Michael Hurst
- Written by: Stephen Sinclair
- Produced by: Rachel Jean
- Starring: Kevin Smith
- Cinematography: Dale McCready
- Edited by: Nicola Smith
- Music by: Jason Smith
- Production company: Frame Up Films
- Release date: July 19, 2001
- Running time: 47 minutes
- Country: New Zealand
- Language: English

Love Mussel is a 2001 New Zealand television film. It is a mockumentary where Kevin Smith, playing himself, investigates a town who are harvesting an aphrodisiac species of geoduck (pronounced as gooey duck). First commissioned for a Sunday drama series, it was originally intended to star Sam Neill.

== Synopsis ==
Kevin Smith is creating a documentary in the town of Ureroa where they have the Gooey Duck, a shellfish with Viagra-like properties. Focussing on locals, Bob and Noeline, who harvest the shellfish, Smith tries one himself with disastrous consequences.

== Cast ==
- Kevin Smith as Kevin Smith
- Geoff Snell as Bob Fife
- Vicky Haughton as Noeline Fife
- Jacqueline van Beek as Fiona Mathieson
- Jennifer Ward-Lealand as Doctor
- Peter Feeney as Rod Umber
- Greg Johnson as Donald Strack
- Michael Hurst as Stephen Jessop
- Pinky Agnew as Jenny Shipley
- John Campbell as John Campbell

== Reception ==
Jane Bowron in The Evening Post said it was "Made along the lines of Frontline, the gentle Australian satire about the shenanigans of a TV channel" and wrote "Of course it was supposed to be terribly funny that a chap of Smith's obvious sexual charms (he always looks like he might strip at any moment) would develop an erotic appetite for the MP for Ashburton." The Listener's Diana Wichtel said "as a comedian [Kevin Smith] put his Me Tarzan good looks to even better use. Thanks to him, a lively script and deft directing, Love Mussel was a good, honest laugh."
