= Typhon's People =

- Written by: Margaret Mahy
- Directed by: Yvonne Mackay
- Starring: Greg Wise; Sophie Lee; Lucy Lawless; John Bach; Alfred Molina
- Composer: Ken Young
- Country of origin: New Zealand
- Original language: English
- No. of seasons: 1
- No. of episodes: 2

Production
- Executive producer: Dorothee Pinfold
- Producer: Dave Gibson
- Cinematography: Wayne Vinten
- Editor: Jamie Selkirk
- Running time: 120 minutes
- Production company: Gibson Group

Original release
- Release: July 26 – July 27, 1994

Typhon's People is a 1994 New Zealand sci-fi television mini series written by Margaret Mahy. It was nominated for five awards at the 1995 New Zealand Film and Television Awards winning for Best Soundtrack - Television (Michael Hopkins) and Best Design - Television (Tony Rabbit, Ken Durey and Clive Memmott). The series, which began filming in January 1993, was also edited into a 90 minute telemovie.

About to present the results of his genetic experiments on humans, scientist David Typhon is killed. People head to his lab to investigate.

== Cast ==
- Greg Wise as Cato McGill / Adam Prime
- Sophie Lee as Maia Tertius
- Lucy Lawless as Mink Tertius
- Alfred Molina as Andreus
- John Bach as Daniel Harrington
- Michael Hurst as Constantine
- Stephen Lovatt as Denzil
- Tony Barry as The minister
