= Emma Harrison (actress) =

New Zealand actress and model

- Emma Harrison, 2007
- Born: Christchurch, New Zealand
- Occupation(s): Actress, model, dancer
- Years active: 1989–present

Emma Harrison is an actress, model and dancer, best known for the role of Joanna Hartman in the Australian soap-opera Neighbours.

== Early life ==
Harrison was born in Christchurch, New Zealand, and raised in Australia. She began performing in ballet and school plays from a young age. Harrison started modelling at the age of 15, when she was spotted in the audience of a beauty contest and was signed by a local modelling agency. She started her television career with commercials, including Palmolive, and KFC. Harrison studied Business at Bond University in Queensland, before dropping out as it was not for her, and moving to Sydney to pursue her acting career.

== Modeling career ==
After she was signed, Harrison spent the next two years working with Impulse and Coca-Cola. She also served as a feature model for many hair and beauty lines, including Remington. Harrison also appeared in many pop culture magazines, eventually making appearances for many designers, including Donna Karan.

She has appeared on the covers of many magazines such as FHM, Loaded, Maxim, Ralph and Inside Sport. She was ranked Number 18 of FHM's 100 sexiest women of 1998, named one of the 100 sexiest sports models of 2003 by Inside Sport Magazine, and chosen by Australian Playboy as one of the 10 sexiest women in the world.

Harrison co-created and was the sole model for The Yoga Girl 2010 Calendar. The calendar was released in late 2009 by BrownTrout and was named one of the Top 5 Yoga Calendars of the year. She has continued her association with BrownTrout, with the publisher having Harrison's 2011 Yoga Girl Calendar currently on offer and the 2012 edition scheduled for release in the Fall of this year.

Harrison is featured in a March 2011 national campaign for Hard Tail Forever, and appeared in full-page ads in Yoga Journal and other US publications. She was also photographed for Ritz-Carlton Residences in Vail, Colorado and for Gaiam Lifestyle Media & Personal Growth Solutions.

== Acting ==
Harrison appeared in an episode of Mission: Impossible as a slave girl when she was 16 years old. In 1993, she appeared in Time Trax.

Harrison auditioned for a role on Neighbours in 1995. She was initially unaware the character she was reading for would be Annalise Hartman's (Kimberley Davies) long lost sister, Joanna. The character was Harrison's first major television role. The actress told a writer for the Daily Mirror that it took ten months for her to feel comfortable in her new role. In February 1997, producers told Harrison they were writing her out of Neighbours. She departed on screen on 15 April 1997.

In cinema, Harrison appeared in the Coen Brothers' Intolerable Cruelty, Robert Altman's The Company, and in Street Fighter as Nicola.

In 2007, she appeared in an episode of McLeod's Daughters as Susan.

== Presenting ==
Harrison travelled to England where she was already known due to Neighbours.

While in the UK, she hosted two television programmes and was selected as a presenter for the BAFTA Awards.

Harrison's hosting jobs in the United States included fronting the reality show "Butler Bootcamp" for Wealth TV and appearing as a recurring host on Comcast's Vista TV.

== Adverts ==
She has appeared on commercials for Budweiser, Taco Bell, Subway, ABC Sports and TNT.

== Other appearances ==
In 2004 Harrison appeared in eight instalments of E!'s Style Network's "Style Court".

In 2006 she appeared in Take Home Chef with Curtis Stone on The Learning Channel.

== Personal life ==
Emma Harrison currently resides in Los Angeles and Burleigh Heads, Queensland, Australia.
