= I'll Make You Happy (1999 film) =

- Directed by: Athina Tsoulis
- Written by: Anne Tsoulis; Athina Tsoulis
- Produced by: Liz Stevens
- Starring: Jodie Rimmer; Michael Hurst; Carl Bland; Ian Hughes
- Cinematography: Rewa Harre
- Edited by: Chris Plummer
- Release date: April 8, 1999
- Running time: 92 min
- Country: New Zealand
- Language: English
- Budget: Production: $130,000; Post-production: $400,000

I'll Make You Happy is a New Zealand film released in 1999. It was directed by Athina Tsoulis and starred Jodie Rimmer as a prostitute who plans a heist from her pimp. Also appearing were Michael Hurst, Rena Owen and Jennifer Ward-Lealand along with a cameo from Lucy Lawless.

The film's script was written by Anne Tsoulis for the South Australian Film Corporation but after they abandonded the film the rights went back to Tsoulis. Her sister Athina Tsoulis re-wrote the script and found funding to shoot the film. The New Zealand Film Corporation funded post-production after they saw a rough cut of the film. The film was shot on 16mm with shooting took place over a period of just over 4 weeks with cast and crew deferring their fees.

== Cast ==
- Jodie Rimmer as Siggy
- Carl Bland as Lester
- Ian Hughes as Drew
- Michael Hurst as Lou
- Jennifer Ward-Lealand as Mel
- Rena Owen as Mickie
- Sandy Ireland as Fran
- Raybon Kan as Mouse

== Reception ==
David Stratton wrote in Variety "Pic is modestly budgeted and the basic plot terribly familiar, but Rimmer is an attractive heroine and director Tsoulis keeps the action bubbling along cheerfully enough, backed by some lively music." The New Zealand Herald's Naomi Larkin says "I'll Make You Happy's biggest disappointments come from its inconsistency and weak storyline. There are moments of real humour and warmth but overall it fails to gel." Charlotte Evans from Sunday News gave it 3 stars and wrote "Director Athina Tsoulis and sister Anne Tsoulis have - for the most part - written a screenplay that mixes a wide range of comic elements successfully. There is, however, too much time spent building up to the sting and not enough on the actual execution of it, which is when the movie really hits its marks." In the Sunday Star Times Michael Lamb also gave it 3 stars. He said "you may be forgiven for lapsing into a daydream during certain stretches of the middle reels, but some of that sagginess is redeemed by the cleverly wrought ending, which offers, finally, some of the best comic moments." Helene Wong, writing in Listener, says "Funded principally by generosity, determination and credit card, it's a testament to film makers who can't be bothered waiting for permission to work. It's not the ideal way to go, but they've pulled it off. And, yes, it will make you happy." Cinema Aotearoa called it "a formless, tonally inconsistent comedy-drama which may have seemed scandalous at the time, but now is just a dated and silly slice of 90s nostalgia populated with a remarkable cast."

== Awards ==
1999 New Zealand Film Awards

- Best Actor- Carl Bland - nominated
- Best Actress - Sandy Ireland - nominated
- Best Costume Design - Emma Aubin - nominated
