= Schtung =

New Zealand prog rock band

Schtüng
- Origin: Wellington, New Zealand
- Genres: Progressive rock, art rock
- Years active: 1976–1979
- Labels: Polydor, Reaction
- Past members: David Bowater; Geoff Bowdler; Andrew Hagen; Paul Jeffery; Rob Sinclair; Morton Wilson

Schtüng were a New Zealand progressive rock band active from 1976. The band developed out of school-era bands formed by friends keyboardist/vocalist Andrew Hagen and guitarist/vocalist Morton Wilson.

Additional members were: Rob Sinclair (bass/vocals), Paul Jeffrey (keyboards/vocals), Geoff Bowdler drums), and Dave Bowater (woodwinds/percussion).

The band signed a recording contract with PolyGram underwater, wearing scuba gear. After releasing an album in 1977 they appeared at free concerts in Auckland's Albert Park, and music festivals including Nambassa. After breaking up in 1979, Schtung morphed into a media company Schtung Media that is still active today.

Schtung released music videos for singles such as They Sleep Early in Cologne and National Scandal.

After Schtung disbanded, Hagen and Wilson founded Schtung Productions, and Jeffrey co-founded Oceania Productions. Sinclair and Bowater participated in recordings that were released as 3 Voices.
