= Vermilion (film) =

- Directed by: Dorthe Scheffmann
- Written by: Dorthe Scheffmann
- Produced by: Michele Fantl; Nik Beachman; Dorthe Scheffmann
- Starring: Jennifer Ward-Lealand
- Cinematography: Maria Ines Manchego
- Edited by: Peter Roberts
- Music by: Don McGlashan
- Release date: 18 October 2018
- Running time: 92 min
- Country: New Zealand
- Language: English

Vermilion is a 2018 New Zealand film written and directed by Dorthe Scheffmann and starring Jennifer Ward-Lealand.

== Cast ==
- Jennifer Ward-Lealand as Darcy
- Theresa Healey as Sarah
- Emily Campbell as Zoe
- Goretti Chadwick as Sila
- Peter Feeney as Peter
- Guy Montgomery as Frank
- Will Wallace as David

== Reception ==
James Croot in Stuff gave it 3 1/2 stars and says "While not everything works - an Irish accent occasionally goes awry, some dialogue delivery feels a little off - Vermilion is an absorbing drama illuminated by talent that needs and deserves more moments in the spotlight like this." The New Zealand Herald's Francesca Rudkin writes "Vermilion is a grown up film. It doesn't feel the need to spell it all out; rather, it encourages the viewer to participate, and form their own ideas about characters and their relationships." Simon Morris on RNZ's At The Movies says "I don't want to be nasty to something as well-meaning as Vermilion, but it's a good example of what's often wrong with so many New Zealand feature films: not enough plot, no conflict, characters that no-one wants to offend."
