= That Was the Week That Was =

British satirical television programme (1962–1963)

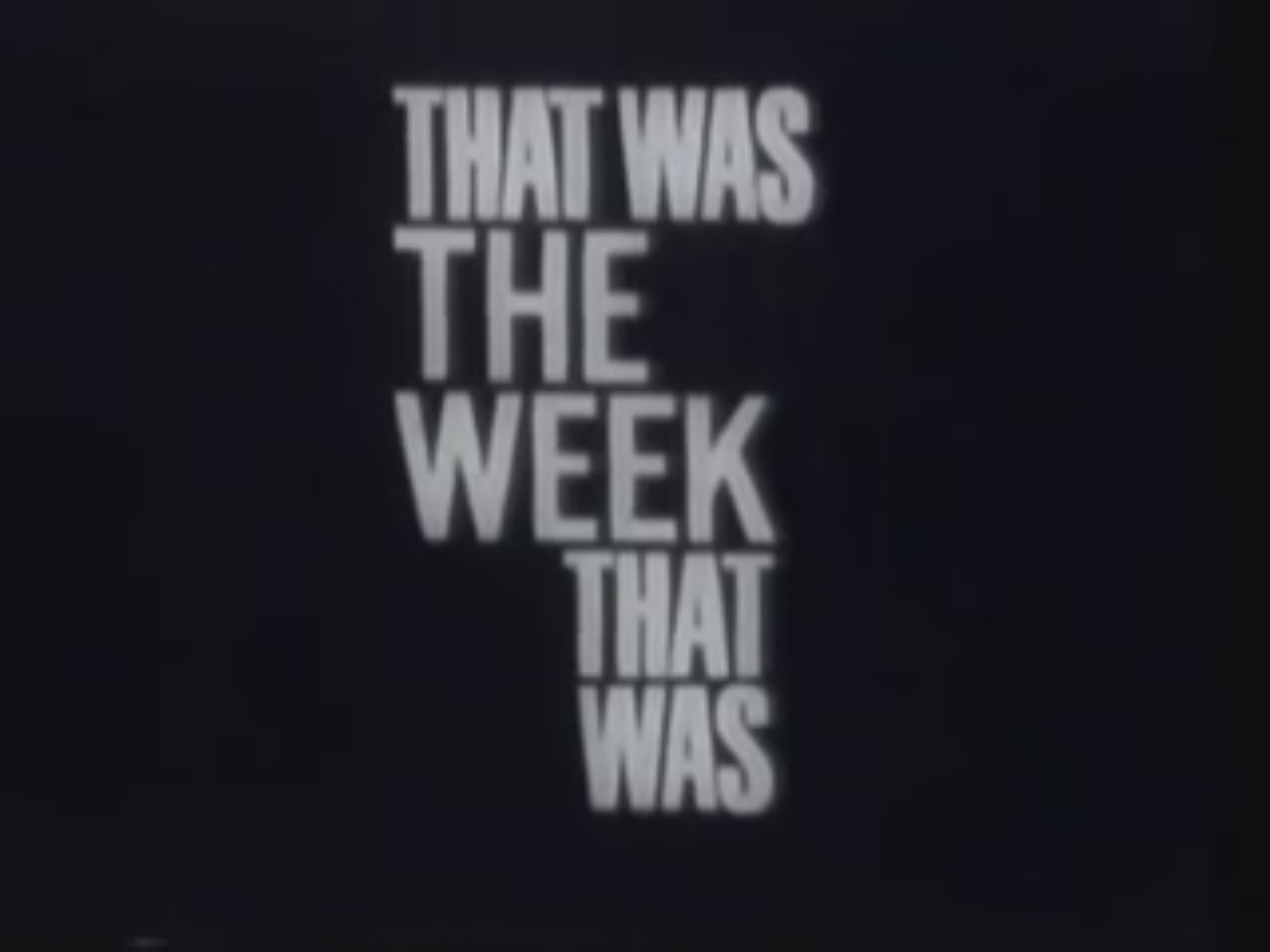
- Also known as: TW3
- Genre: Satire
- Created by: Ned Sherrin; Jack Duncan
- Presented by: David Frost
- Theme music composer: Ron Grainer
- Country of origin: United Kingdom
- Original language: English
- No. of series: 2
- No. of episodes: 37

Production
- Producer: Ned Sherrin
- Running time: 50 minutes
- Production company: BBC

Original release
- Network: BBC TV
- Release: 24 November 1962 – 28 December 1963

Related
- Not So Much a Programme, More a Way of Life (1964–1965); BBC-3 (1965-1966)

That Was the Week That Was, informally TWTWTW or TW3, is a satirical television comedy programme that aired on BBC Television in 1962 and 1963. It was devised, produced, and directed by Ned Sherrin and Jack (aka John) Duncan, and presented by David Frost.

The programme is considered a significant element of the satire boom in the UK in the early 1960s, as it broke ground in comedy by lampooning political figures. TW3 was broadcast from Saturday, 24 November 1962 to late December 1963. An American version under the same title aired on NBC from 1964 to 1965, also featuring Frost.

== Cast and writers ==
Cast members included cartoonist Timothy Birdsall, political commentator Bernard Levin, and actors Lance Percival, who sang topical calypsos, many improvised to suggestions from the audience, Kenneth Cope, Roy Kinnear, Willie Rushton, Al Mancini, Robert Lang, David Kernan and Millicent Martin. The last two were also singers and the programme opened with a song – "That Was The Week That Was" – sung by Martin to Ron Grainer's theme tune and enumerating topics in the news. Frankie Howerd also guested in one episode with stand-up comedy.

Script-writers included John Albery, John Antrobus, John Betjeman, John Bird, Graham Chapman, John Cleese, Peter Cook, Roald Dahl, Robin Grove-White, Richard Ingrams, Lyndon Irving, Gerald Kaufman, Frank Muir, David Nobbs, Denis Norden, Bill Oddie, Dennis Potter, Eric Sykes, Kenneth Tynan, and Keith Waterhouse.

== Programme ==
1963 Radio Times cover promotes the return of the programme for a second series.

The programme opened with a song ("That was the week that was, It's over, let it go ...") sung by Millicent Martin, backed by the resident Dave Lee house band, including guitarist Cedric West. The opening song featured new lyrics each week referring to the news of the week just gone. Lance Percival sang a topical calypso each week. Satirical targets, such as Prime Minister Harold Macmillan and Home Secretary Henry Brooke were lampooned in sketches, debates and monologues. Some other targets included the monarchy, the British Empire, nuclear deterrence, advertising, public relations and propaganda, capital punishment, sexual and social hypocrisy, the class system, and the BBC itself. Well-remembered sketches include the 12 January 1963 "consumers' guide to religion", which discussed relative merits of faiths in the manner of a Which? magazine report and led to the Church of England being described a 'best buy'.

The programme was not party political but did not treat all issues with what the producers considered to be a false level of impartiality and balance; one example of this is the issue of racism and "the evils of apartheid", following the view of BBC Director-General Sir Hugh Greene that the BBC should not be bound by its charter to be impartial on issues of racism, which Greene and the producers of TW3 viewed as "quite simply wrong". Following the 1963 murder of 35-year-old white postal worker William Lewis Moore in Alabama, who was on a protest march against segregation in the American South, TW3's Millicent Martin dressed as Uncle Sam sang a parody of "I Wanna Go Back to Mississippi" ("... where the Mississippi mud/kinda mingles with the blood/of the niggers who are hanging from the branches of the tree ...") accompanied by minstrel singers in blackface ("... we hate all the darkies and the Catholics and the Jews / Where we welcome any man / Who is white and strong and belongs to the Ku Klux Klan"), thus parodying The Black and White Minstrel Show, which was then being shown on the BBC despite accusations of racism over its use of blackface.

On Saturday, 20 October 1962 the award of Nobel prizes to John Kendrew and Max Perutz, and to Francis Crick, James D. Watson, and Maurice Wilkins was satirised in a short sketch with the prizes referred to as the Alfred Nobel Peace Pools; in this sketch Watson was called "Little J. D. Watson" and "Who'd have thought he'd ever get the Nobel Prize? Makes you think, doesn't it". The germ of the joke was that Watson was only 25 when he helped discover the structure of DNA; much younger than the others.

TW3 was broadcast on Saturday night and attracted an audience of 12 million. It often under- or overran as cast and crew worked through material as they saw fit. At the beginning of the second season in the autumn of 1963, in an attempt to assert control over the programme, the BBC scheduled repeats of The Third Man television series after the end of TW3. Frost suggested a means of sabotaging this tactic to Sherrin, and he agreed. For three weeks, at the end of each episode Frost read out a brief summary of the plot of the episode of The Third Man that was due to follow the show, spoiling its twists, until the repeats were abandoned following the direct intervention of Greene.

Frost often ended a satirical attack with the remark "But seriously, he's doing a grand job". At the end of each episode, Frost usually signed off with: "That was the week, that was." At the end of the final programme he announced: "That was ‘That Was The Week That Was’ …that was."

=== Kennedy tribute ===
TW3 produced a shortened 20-minute programme with no satire for the edition on Saturday, 23 November 1963, the day after the assassination of President John F. Kennedy. It featured a contribution from Dame Sybil Thorndike and Millicent Martin performing the tribute song "In the Summer of His Years" by Herbert Kretzmer. This was screened on NBC the following day, and the soundtrack was released by Decca Records. A clip featuring Roy Kinnear was shown in the David L. Wolper documentary film Four Days in November and on the History Channel 2009 documentary JFK: 3 Shots that Changed America. BBC presenter Richard Dimbleby broadcast the president's funeral from Washington, and he said that the programme was a good expression of the sorrow felt in Britain.

== Reception ==
Prime Minister Harold Macmillan was initially supportive of the programme, chastising Postmaster General Reginald Bevins for threatening to "do something about it". However, the BBC received many complaints from organisations and establishment figures. Lord Aldington, vice-chairman of the Conservative Party, wrote to BBC director-general Hugh Greene that Frost had a hatred of the prime minister which "he finds impossible to control". The programme also attracted complaints from the Boy Scout Association about an item questioning the sexuality of its founder Lord Baden-Powell, and from the government of Cyprus which claimed that a joke about their ruler Archbishop Makarios was a "gross violation of internationally accepted ethics".

Historians have identified TW3 as breaking ground in comedy and broadcasting. Graham McCann said that it challenged the "convention that television should not acknowledge that it is television; the show made no attempt to hide its cameras, allowed the microphone boom to intrude, and often revealed other nuts and bolts of studio technology." This was unusual in the 1960s and gave the programme a modern feel. TW3 also flouted conventions by adopting "a relaxed attitude to its running time", and "it seemed to last just as long as it wanted". "The image of the BBC as 'Auntie' vanished for ever", Timothy Green wrote in 1972.

The programme was taken off the air at short notice in December 1963 with the explanation that "1964 is a General Election year".

== Legacy ==
TW3 was broadcast live, but it was normally recorded for legal reasons; only the pilot episode was not recorded. A compilation of material was shown on BBC Four to celebrate the 40th anniversary. The series placed 29th in the 100 Greatest British Television Programmes in 2000.

== Alternative versions ==
=== US versions ===
NBC aired an American version as a one-hour special on 10 November 1963, and followed it with a weekly series that ran from 10 January 1964 to May 1965. The pilot featured Henry Fonda and Henry Morgan, with Mike Nichols and Elaine May as guests, and supporting performers including Gene Hackman. The recurring cast included Frost, Morgan, Buck Henry, Tom Bosley, and Alan Alda, with Nancy Ames singing an opening news-satire-song and Stanley Grover and Ames performing solos and duets. Regularly contributing writers included Gloria Steinem, William F. Brown, Tom Lehrer, and Calvin Trillin. Norman Paris was the musical director. The announcer was Jerry Damon. A running gag was a mock feud with Jack Paar, whose own program followed TW3 on the NBC Friday schedule; Paar repeatedly referred to TW3 as "Henry Morgan's Amateur Hour".

Of 50 episodes, only a few survive in video form, yet audio episodes survive on acetate disc. The first-season black-and-white episodes were preserved on kinescope film; the surviving colour episodes of the second and final season were recorded in the then-standard two-inch colour quadruplex videotape format. The Paley Center has copies of some seven episodes, including the hour-long pilot. Also, scripts of all shows survive, both in the NBC Collection at the Library of Congress and in the papers of executive producer Leland Hayward at the New York Public Library. Amateur audio recordings of all or nearly all episodes also survive, and an hour-long recording, That Was That Was the Week That Was, a compilation of bits from various shows, was issued on LP and, in 1992, reissued on CD. After the series' cancellation, Lehrer, who did not appear on the show, recorded a collection of his songs used on the show on That Was the Year That Was, released by Reprise Records in September 1965.

ABC aired a That Was the Week That Was special on 21 April 1985, hosted by David Frost and Anne Bancroft and featuring future Saturday Night Live cast members Jan Hooks and A. Whitney Brown and puppetry from Spitting Image.

=== Other international versions ===
A Canadian show, This Hour Has Seven Days, aired from 1964 to 1966 on CBC. Although partially inspired by That Was The Week That Was, the Canadian show mixed satirical aspects with more serious journalism. It proved controversial and was cancelled after two seasons amid allegations of political interference. This Hour Has 22 Minutes, created by Newfoundland comic Mary Walsh, has been running since 1992 although the two are not related.

An Australian show, The Mavis Bramston Show, aired from 1964 to 1968 on the Seven Network. It grew out of the recent local theatrical tradition of topical satirical revue—most notably the popular revues staged at Sydney's Phillip Street Theatre in the 1950s and 1960s—but it was also strongly influenced by the British satire boom and especially TW3 and Not Only... But Also.

The New Zealand show A Week Of It ran from 1977 to 1979, hosted by Ken Ellis, and featuring comedians David McPhail, Peter Rowley and Chris McVeigh and comedian/musicians Jon Gadsby and Annie Whittle. The series lampooned news and politics and featured songs, usually by McPhail and Gadsby, who continued with their own show, McPhail and Gadsby in similar vein.

A Dutch version, Zo is het toevallig ook nog 's een keer (It Just So Happens Once Again), aired from November 1963 to 1966. It became controversial after the fourth edition, which included a parody of the Lord's Prayer ("Give us this day our daily television"). Angry viewers directed their protests especially against the most popular cast member: Mies Bouwman. After receiving several threats to her life she decided to quit the show. The show was praised as well: in 1966 it received the Gouden Televizier-ring, a prestigious audience award—though it turned out afterward that the election was rigged.

An Indian version titled The Week That Wasn't was launched and hosted by Cyrus Broacha.

In 2004, ABC News revived the iconic TW3 theme song as a closing segment on its weekly magazine program, Primetime Live. Several two-minute episodes aired, but never caught on with the audience.

== Parodies ==
Cleveland, Ohio, local personality Ghoulardi (played by Ernie Anderson), host of WJW-TV's Shock Theater in the 1960s, ran clips of local celebrities and politicians and satirised them in a Shock Theater segment entitled That Was Weak Wasn't It?

Beginning in 2006, 1812 Productions, an all comedy theatre company in Philadelphia, Pennsylvania, has annually performed a stage show called This Is the Week That Is. The variety show style play is written by its small cast with a script that changes nightly over several weeks of performances, and includes improvised comedy, musical parodies, and a versatile cast of performers. The show focuses on politics and news from the preceding year, often taking on local Philadelphia stories as well. In 2019, a documentary, In the Field; Conceiving Satire: The Making of This Is The Week That Is, about the creation of the long-running show was commissioned by the American Theatre Wing and nominated for a Mid-Atlantic Emmy Award for Arts Program/Special.

== Bibliography ==
- McCann, Graham (2006). Spike & Co. London: Hodder & Stoughton. ISBN 0-340-89809-7.
- Hegarty, Neil (2016). Frost – That Was the Life That Was: The Authorised Biography. Ebury Publishing. ISBN 978-0-7535-5672-6.
