= Peter Rowley =

New Zealand comic actor and writer

Peter Rowley (sometimes credited as Harrison Rowley during his early career) (born 29 April 1952) is a New Zealand comic actor and writer. He is best known for his television roles, where he has played in numerous popular television series as comic foil and straight man to comedians such as Billy T. James, David McPhail and Jon Gadsby.

Rowley started his comedy career in New Zealand. He made his New Zealand television debut as an actor and writer in the satirical sketch show A Week of It, following which he continued to work with that show's stars David McPhail and Jon Gadsby in McPhail and Gadsby and Letter to Blanchy. He also worked with Billy T. James in The Billy T James Show, for which he also wrote material. He received title billing in the series Pete and Pio (1994) alongside fellow comedian Pio Terei. In 2010, Rowley wrote and presented a tribute to the late Billy T. James, entitled Billy T. and Me.

Rowley has also worked in feature films, most notably as the voice actor for the titular Dog in Footrot Flats: The Dog's Tale. His voice acting credentials also include work on the television series Power Rangers Ninja Storm, voicing the character Zurgane.

== Filmography ==
- The Stranger (1964) as Jeffrey Mason
- Fatty Finn (1980) as Chauffeur
- Prisoners (1981) as Hapstood
- A Dangerous Summer (1982) as Immigration Officer
- Savage Islands (1983) as Louis Beck
- Trespasses (1984) as Andy McIntire
- Second Time Lucky (1984) as Technician 2
- Pallet on the Floor (1984) as Henderson
- Came a Hot Friday (1985) as Bar Man
- Footrot Flats: The Dog's Tale (1986) as Dog (voice)
- Those Dear Departed (1987) as Prophet
- Never Say Die (1988) as Armed Police Leader
- The Tommyknockers (miniseries) (1993) as Policeofficer
- The Climb (1997) as Rules Rhodes
- Cupid's Prey (2003) as Policeman
- Power Rangers Ninja Storm (2003, TV Series) as Zurgane (voice)
- Power Rangers Dino Thunder (2004, TV Series) as Zurgane (voice)
- Perfect Creature (2006) as Man In The Street
- Ozzie (2006) as Buzz Maroni
- Russian Snark (2010) as Neville
- Netherwood (2011) as Carl
- I Am Evangeline (2015) as The Weeping Man
- Mortal Engines (2017) as Orme Wreyland
