= Sleeping Dogs (1977 film) =

1977 film by Roger Donaldson

- Film poster
- Directed by: Roger Donaldson
- Written by: Ian Mune; Arthur Baysting
- Produced by: Roger Donaldson; Larry Parr
- Starring: Sam Neill; Ian Mune; Nevan Rowe; Warren Oates
- Cinematography: Michael Seresin
- Edited by: Ian John
- Music by: Mathew Brown; David Calder; Murray Grindlay
- Production companies: Aardvark Films; Broadbank Films
- Distributed by: Satori (United States)
- Release date: 13 July 1977 (Australia)
- Running time: 107 minutes
- Country: New Zealand
- Language: English
- Box office: $450,000 (New Zealand)

Sleeping Dogs is a 1977 New Zealand action political thriller film directed by Roger Donaldson, originally based on C. K. Stead's 1971 New Zealand novel Smith's Dream. Starring Sam Neill, Ian Mune, and Warren Oates, it was the first feature-length 35 mm colour film produced entirely in New Zealand. It was a major critical and commercial success both domestically and comparatively abroad, and launched the career of Neill into subsequent international stardom.

A political thriller with many action elements, it follows the lead man alone character Smith (Neill) as New Zealand plunges into a police state after a fascist government institutes martial law following violent industrial disputes and a false flag attack. Smith gets caught between the special police and an underground resistance movement, and reluctantly becomes involved. Often named one of the best New Zealand films of all time, it is considered a classic and landmark film of the new wave of New Zealand cinema that flourished over the 1970s and 1980s.

== Plot ==
The film opens with a news bulletin (from Dougal Stevenson) announcing the sudden return of PM Volkner from urgent Middle East oil embargo talks to respond to New Zealand's worst union dispute "since 1951". A general strike looms with street brawls and petrol rationing, and Volkner promises a hardline response with new emergency legislation. After Smith's marriage to Gloria falls apart after her affair with a man named Bullen, Smith leaves the city with no plans, driving out to the isolated Coromandel Peninsula. After coming across an island he likes, he gets approval to live there from the Māori owner. The owner's son gives him a dog and talks Smith into trading his new car for a dinghy.

Some time after Smith starts living on the island, masked gunmen shoot soldiers and demonstrators outside the downtown Auckland wharves. One gunman shoots the others and flees, before being paid by an associate of Volkner. Smith finds a working military radio in the shack on the island and listens to Volkner's declaration of martial law. Later, Gloria and Bullen are caught up in a special police crackdown, and after saving her Bullen realises his ID card was taken. Smith mentions the radio to a man on the wharf who has watched him since his arrival, before asking him for a gun to deal with possums. Smith returns and finds a rifle in his boat. Back on the island, he discovers a large pit dug close to the shack.

That night Smith sees explosions nearby and police arrive the next day to search the island. After finding the rifle and radio they take him to a police station, where he is imprisoned while other prisoners are interrogated. The dog is last seen swimming after the boat. When first brought inside, Smith recognises someone as a former schoolmate, but only later remembers his name. Jesperson, Volkner's associate, visits Smith and reveals that the special police think Smith is a key guerrilla leader after they found weapon caches on the island. Smith pleads his innocence, but Jesperson offers either expulsion from New Zealand in return for a full confession, or trial by a military tribunal with a likely death sentence. While being taken to the TV station the next day to confess, Smith vomits on the guard and escapes the van onto Queen St.

Smith finds out Bullen and Gloria have gone underground to escape the specials and he leaves town, ending up at a small tourist campground and where he is quickly hired and starts dating local girl Mary. Relieved to be out of the conflict, the arrival of Bullen, now a key resistance member, complicates Smith's situation. Bullen reveals that Smith has already been using the resistance to survive and is now seen as a revolutionary hero, but Smith insists on staying out of it. A unit of US Army "advisors" begin using the camp as their base of operations. As the US forces kill more rebels, Smith clashes with Willoughby (Oates), the commander of the US forces, who starts suspecting Smith of being a rebel sympathiser. After Smith reunites with Gloria and finds out she's also part of the resistance, he's unwillingly drawn by Bullen into helping the guerrillas lead the US military unit into an ambush, in which Mary is killed.

Fleeing the scene of the attack, Smith and Gloria spend the night together, but are two hours late for the VW Kombi ride meant to take Smith back to the Coromandel. Taking a sheep truck instead, Bullen and Smith narrowly avoid being discovered by special police at a checkpoint where they pass the shot-up Kombi with two dead and one injured guerilla. After arriving, they realise Gloria's dead after she doesn't pick up the phone, and Smith finds out resistance members framed him. A surprise raid by specials forces Bullen and Smith to flee by car towards the resistance camp in the mountains, but are pursued by special police on foot and by helicopter, with Smith leaving the others as they close in. RNZAF jets bomb the encampment and Smith soon arrives at the aftermath, finding almost everyone dead, and a deeply wounded Bullen. Refusing to let him die, Smith carries Bullen out of the mountains, only to be cornered by Jesperson and his elite squad. After Bullen is fatally wounded, Smith – who is being publicized by the government as a symbol of the resistance movement, but wishes an end to what is happening – deliberately provokes Jesperson into shooting him, denying Jesperson the chance to interrogate him or use him as an example.

== Cast ==
- Sam Neill as Smith
- Nevan Rowe as Gloria
- Ian Mune as Bullen
- Ian Watkin as Dudley
- Warren Oates as Colonel Willoughby
- Clyde Scott as Jesperson
- Bill Johnson as Cousins
- Don Selwyn as Taupiri
- Donna Akersten as Mary
- Davina Whitehouse as Elsie
- Tony Martin as Intrigued School Child
- Roger Oakley as Assassin Leader
- Dougal Stevenson as News Reader
- Snuffles as Dog

== Production ==
=== Origins ===
Roger Donaldson, an Australian who moved to New Zealand in 1965 to escape the Australian Vietnam draft, had by the mid-1970s transitioned from running a photography and TV commercial studio into directing a number of documentaries, TV movies, and shorts for various New Zealand state-funded production companies. He reached new levels of success in 1976 with Winners & Losers, a series of New Zealand short stories adapted for TV that received critical acclaim and some of the first international interest in New Zealand cinema. Some of the key crew from Winners & Losers alongside others Donaldson had collaborated with on previous shoots would become the core of the Sleeping Dogs crew.

Donaldson and actor-director Ian Mune had been working together since the early 1970s on various projects, including 1974 TV movie Derek, and as the duo largely responsible for Winners & Losers. Alongside a few others, they had been trying to get a New Zealand feature film made for years. There had been a small wave of local independent cinema in the first half of the century, most notably from directors like Rudall Hayward and John O'Shea, but a lack of financing, state assistance, and proven international appeal meant that a 35 mm colour feature film had yet to be produced domestically. Films had been occasionally shot in New Zealand, like 1972's Rangi's Catch, but very rarely by a domestic production company.

At the time, the only domestic pathways for New Zealand filmmakers were either through documentaries at the National Film Unit, or through television under the New Zealand Broadcasting Corporation, which by 1975 had split into Radio New Zealand, Television One and Two. Much of the Sleeping Dogs crew, including core members like Donaldson, Neill, Mune, and others, had already done significant work in both fields, but found there were no avenues for feature films through these traditional state-owned channels, as the government which funded these agencies had long seen feature films as unimportant. There was also no state body like a film commission to assist or provide incentives for productions, making private financing of New Zealand films rare, although the Queen Elizabeth II Arts Council had been pushing the government to support the industry more since the early 1970s.

=== Pre-production ===
At the 1976 Cannes Film Festival, Donaldson and Mune had been able to get syndication for Winners & Losers in America, England, Canada, the Netherlands, Sweden, Norway, and Denmark, which emboldened them again to try again to create a feature. Donaldson reckoned that New Zealand could produce something as good as many of the competition films, and thought he'd either try make one in New Zealand or head elsewhere. Later that year, Donaldson read Smith's Dream after he was recommended it by advertising executive Bob Harvey, and he decided that following the now-proven popularity of New Zealand adaptions, Smith's Dream was the best book to try make into a feature.

==== Script ====
Donaldson called Mune before he flew out to a film festival in Hong Kong, and told him to go to the library to read Smith's Dream and write a treatment before he returned in 10 days. Written after he returned, the script was officially credited to Ian Mune and Arthur Baysting, a writer who had also worked on episodes of Winners & Losers, but it was penned somewhat collaboratively among the pair, Donaldson, and a few collaborators attempting to "[give] form to this vision that Roger had". Geoff Murphy, who had worked with both Donaldson, Mune and others before, contributed to the script as special effects director by advising on what would be technically feasible. Murphy's criticism of the original draft led to Donaldson dropping a scene and adding a different one elsewhere. Donaldson also visited C. K. Stead to ask for permission to adapt Smith's Dream, which was granted, but Stead thought it was unlikely the film would ever get made.

==== Casting ====
Donaldson, with three actors that he "had to cast", wrote a letter to Sam Neill from Hong Kong, at the time a documentary director and editor at the National Film Unit, asking him to play leading man Smith. Neill had occasionally acted alongside being behind the camera, the year before playing a minor character in Landfall, a 1975 movie originally made for TV but later only released theatrically due to its controversial content, and a small role as a priest in Ashes, a short film about spirituality. However, Neill at the time was considering quitting acting. Donaldson and Mune approached him to play the protagonist due to his performance in Ashes. He accepted, although daunted by the pressure of a feature film. Mune was cast as the second male lead, Bullen, who Donaldson had intended on giving a role from the beginning. Nevan Rowe, a journalist-turned-actress who had joined Donaldson's production company Aardvark Films, was cast as Smith's ex-wife Gloria. Don Selwyn was recruited for a minor role as the Māori man who rents Smith Gut Island.

Late into pre-production, Donaldson was still searching for an actor to play the American commander, someone who the production and crew hoped would have enough star power to help sell the then-unknown New Zealand cast. Donaldson had wanted to get Jack Nicholson, but after getting in touch with Nicholson's agent and informing him that he could pay at most $5,000, the agent told him that Nicholson was far outside of his budget. However, the agent had visited New Zealand a year beforehand and told Donaldson that he had an outdoorsman client, New Hollywood veteran Warren Oates, that would love to see New Zealand in exchange for the lower fee. The production sent Oates the script, some New Zealand travel brochures, and the offer of a holiday in the South Island after ten days of shooting, and he was soon cast as Colonel Willoughby shortly before production began. He told a documentary crew during shooting "[My agent] told me this is a great opportunity, and it's a young film company, and there's not the kind of remunerations you'd normally receive, but you'll get more than that by going."

==== Financing ====
Securing financing proved a huge hurdle for the production. Donaldson had already managed to secure $50,000 off the back of his successes on the small screen from Des Monaghan, a producer at Television One. The production was able to get into negotiations with the Broadbank Corporation, a merchant bank headed at the time by future National leader Don Brash. Broadbank had not financed a film before, and a film had not been privately financed in New Zealand for years, but Brash became a personal supporter of the project, and agreed to put up $150,000 for the film. Associate producer Larry Parr subsequently approached the Queen Elizabeth II Arts Council, chaired at the time by Hamish Keith, with a proposal for the Council to underwrite Broadbank's loan for an extra $100,000, bringing the total to $300,000 NZD (equivalent to $2,820,000 in 2026). Keith later said the proposal "was so outrageous I went along with it."

In January 1977, it was announced Donaldson's production company, Aardvark Films, had reached a deal for financing to adapt Smith's Dream under the title Sleeping Dogs with Broadbank Films (a company set up by Broadbank Corporation), partly underwritten by the Queen Elizabeth II Arts Council and Television One, with the latter securing domestic and international TV syndication rights in exchange. The film was given a budget of $300,000, with a seven week shoot due to commence on 1 March 1977, followed by 11 weeks of post-production and an estimated release in late 1977.

=== Production ===
From the outset, there was already heavy pressure to deliver the film on schedule and on budget, complicated by a crew largely inexperienced with feature films and a relatively sparse budget with limited resources. The only crew members with real international experience were New Zealand expatriate cinematographer Michael Seresin, having just worked on 1976's Bugsy Malone, and assistant director Tom Binns, with special effects director Geoff Murphy also a veteran but of only local productions.

Further adding to troubles was Donaldson's preference for on-set selection and experimentation compared to rigid pre-planning, which resulted in on-set delays, and his tendency to micro-manage other departments and elements, which sometimes led to conflict. In an interview for 2004's The Making of Sleeping Dogs, Donaldson said "I have this theory that as a movie director, the longer you can delay making up your mind, the longer the creative process can continue." However, this flexibility ended up allowing for levels of inventiveness and problem solving when dealing with the realities of shooting the first New Zealand feature in years on-location on a relatively small budget.

Filming began in Auckland, partly for continuity to shoot the scenes where Neill still had the beard he had been growing before the shoot. According to Neill's autobiography, one of the first scenes shot where Smith escapes the police van on Auckland's Queen Street was filmed without permits, police permission, or extras during a crowded Friday lunchtime. When Neill's stunt double rolled out from the van onto the corner of Queen and Victoria Street, a member of the public tackled him, mistaking the stuntman for a real criminal attempting to escape custody. The stuntman had to point out the camera crew to be released. Neill then had to sprint full speed down Queen St being chased by fake police, trying to avoid "knocking over old ladies" while dodging through the crowded pedestrian traffic.

==== Coromandel ====
In mid-March, the production then moved to Coromandel (a town in the Coromandel Peninsula) where almost all of the non-urban shooting took place. The crew used the only motel in town (and nearby campground) as accommodation, and later used the former in the film as the motel Smith finds work at. On the first day of shooting, much of the town turned out to watch the crew, with the locals then integrated into some scenes. Coromandel's main streets were used as the unnamed small town in the film, including the tuck shop and later car escape sequence.

Soon after they arrived in the Coromandel, Warren Oates arrived for about 10 days of shooting. In the scene where Colonel Willoughby (Oates) first meets Smith at the motel, he is actually holding a page of the script, fearing that he would forget the lines. Oates acted as if the paper was instead a list of directions to the motel. According to Neill, Oates had managed to get in his contract that he'd be supplied with cannabis during the shoot, and was given outdoor-grown Coromandel cannabis by some local crew members. He would apparently smoke joints during shooting, holding it lit behind his back while the camera was rolling, and taking puffs between takes. On-set photos and videos show Oates often smoking.

==== Motel sequence ====
The resistance's attack on the motel was one of the hardest sequences to shoot, featuring long and complex takes with lots of extras, gunfire, explosives, and special effects, and a time-consuming reset process for every new take. The soldier extras were locals coached by the film's main stuntman, Gerry "Popov" (real surname Kostic). With it being the centrepiece action sequence of the film and wanting to get it right, Donaldson did a number of takes of the sequence over multiple days, even with a shortened schedule due to Oates having to leave New Zealand early.

The special effects team, though under pressure throughout much of the production, was pushed particularly by the motel attack. Neill wrote that the production "half blew [the motel] up with our amateur explosive effects, courtesy of Geoff Murphy". Due to both budgetary restraints and import restrictions, many of the explosives and special effects used in the film had to be fashioned together of a variety of materials, including old Ministry of Works explosives and detonators used for dam and tunnel construction, wired together for a variety of purposes by Murphy and his team.

Further complicating the special effects was that importing automatic firearms into New Zealand was highly illegal at the time. While they could use blank rounds for pistols and semi-automatic rifles, multiple scenes in the film required the use of automatic rifles, including the surprise attack, so the special effects team instead created carved and painted wooden machine guns for use in the film. To recreate muzzle flashes that would have otherwise been produced by blanks, the "rifles" had plumbing tube "barrels" fitted on the end and filled with explosive charges, detonated by a wire that ran down the actor's arm, into their clothes and back to a crew member with a switch. When Oates was first handed a wooden rifle on set and told by Murphy to just shake the gun and the crew would make it fire, he was bewildered.

The car escape sequence was another difficult sequence to shoot, with a mix of stunt and actor driving in a car that was very rare in New Zealand at the time. On what was meant to be the first "slow" rehearsal, stuntman Gerry Popov crashed on the first turn.

The surrounding bush was used for the numerous forest sequences, but for the bombing run scene the production wanted to avoid destroying native bush. Instead, they managed to find an area of forest that a farmer had already wanted cleared for use in the sequence.

RNZAF A-4 Skyhawks were featured in the film in courtesy of the permission obtained through AVM Larry Siegert.

== Reception ==
=== Box office ===
The film was the highest-grossing New Zealand film in New Zealand at the time with a gross of $450,000.

=== Critical response ===
Roger Ebert gave the film 3 out of 4 stars in his Chicago Sun-Times review: "Roger Donaldson's Sleeping Dogs, from New Zealand, is a very well made and acted movie... The movie resembles Z and The Battle of Algiers in the way it combines ideology with fiercely-paced action." The film also received a positive review from Janet Maslin in The New York Times: "Roger Donaldson's sharp, suspenseful direction does wonders for the material. What it lacks in originality, Sleeping Dogs makes up in intensity and conviction...Mr. Neill remains appealing and believable, even when the film takes its most improbable turns."

== Legacy ==
The riot scenes in which police with batons and shields beat back protestors was closely mirrored by the actions of police and protestors four years later during the 1981 Springbok tour in New Zealand, which sparked anti-apartheid protests.
