= The God Boy (film) =

- Directed by: Murray Reece
- Written by: Ian Mune
- Produced by: Murray Reece
- Starring: Jamie Higgins; Maria Craig; Graeme Tetley
- Cinematography: Allen Guilford
- Edited by: Simon Reece
- Music by: John Charles
- Release date: 1976
- Running time: 88 min
- Country: New Zealand
- Language: English

The God Boy is a 1976 New Zealand television film. It is based on Ian Cross' novel of the same name. It was the first television feature shown on Television One.

== Cast ==
- Jamie Higgins as Jimmy Sullivan
- Maria Craig as Mrs. Sullivan
- Graeme Tetley as Mr. Sullivan
- Judie Douglass as Sister Angela
- Ian Beavis as Bloody Jack
- Bernard Kearns as Father Gilligan
- Yvonne Lawley as Sister Theresa
- Dorothy McKegg as Sister Francis
- Sandra Reid as Molly Sullivan
- Mark Scott-Smith as Joe Waters

== Reception ==
Helen Martin in New Zealand film, 1912-1996 says "The God Boy is a skilful adaptation of Ian Cross's novel, a rite of passage psychodrama where the surface calm of private and public lives in small town 1950s New Zealand masks repression, abuse, violence and dishonesty." The Press reviewer Ken Coates wrote "the film succeeded mainly because of the buildup of emotional turmoil in a convincing context — Jimmy's home with his drunken, self-pitying father and downtrodden mother; and his school. with its rigid discipline and clear-cut patterns of expected behaviour."
