= Ivan Beavis =

English actor

- Born: 22 April 1926; Liverpool, Lancashire, England
- Died: 24 December 1997 (aged 71); Northampton, England
- Occupation: Actor
- Years active: 1960-1991
- Spouse: Kathleen Atkin (m. 1956)
- Children: 2

Ivan Beavis (22 April 1926 – 24 December 1997) was an English actor, best known for his role as Harry Hewitt, one of the original characters in the British television soap opera Coronation Street.

== Early life and career ==
Beavis was born in Liverpool, Lancashire, to Walter Douglas Stuart Beavis and Gladys Emily Bowling. He was one of five children, with two sisters and two brothers. The family subsequently moved to Hendon, Middlesex (now north London), where Beavis attended Christ's College, Finchley from 1937 to 1941. In 1943, at the age of 17, he enrolled in the Fleet Air Arm, where he served for three years. His father died in 1946.

Following his spell in the forces, Beavis joined Price Waterhouse, in Manchester, as an audit clerk, before being transferred to Northern Ireland. Beavis contracted tuberculosis and spent six months convalescing in a sanatorium in Shropshire. Following his recovery, Beavis took a job as an accountant for Industrial Models, Manchester. Beavis' mother died in 1979. It was after his illness, that Beavis took up amateur dramatics, working with the Little Theatre Guilds Unnamed Society, before joining the Royal Shakespeare Company as Leonato in Much Ado about Nothing, Agamemnon in Troilus and Cressida, Lovewit in The Alchemist and Montague in Romeo and Juliet.

== Coronation Street ==
In 1960, Beavis approached a casting agent, Margaret Morris, from Granada Television. He was shortlisted to play Captain Birdseye, but lost out to John Hewer. He appeared in The Army Game (which starred Bill Fraser and Alfie Bass), Skyport, Knight Errant, Biggles and Famous Trials before he was cast in Coronation Street. Beavis joined the serial from the second episode, on 14 December 1960, playing the shy widowed bus conductor Harry Hewitt.

His character was responsible for bringing up daughter Lucille Hewitt (Jennifer Moss), following the death of her mother in a car crash. He married Rovers Return barmaid Concepta Riley (Doreen Keogh) in 1961. They had a son, Christopher (Victoria Baker as an infant and Stephen Ward as a child), who in October 1962 was kidnapped, and gave Coronation Street a then record 21 million viewers. Beavis continued in this role until 1964, when Hewitt and his wife moved to Ireland.

After leaving the soap, Beavis found himself typecast, and found it hard to secure other roles. In 1967, he convinced the producers to kill his character off. His final appearance was in September 1967. Harry Hewitt died when Len Fairclough's (Peter Adamson) van jack slipped during the wedding of Steve (Paul Maxwell) and Elsie Tanner (Pat Phoenix).

== Later career ==
After leaving Coronation Street in 1964, Beavis toured with fellow actors Doreen Keogh, Frank Pemberton, Ruth Holden and Lynne Carol in a farce, Coronation Street On The Road, written by Coronation Street writers Vince Powell and John Finch. However, the tour was a failure. Beavis then toured New Zealand with Pat Phoenix in Gaslight. He appeared in the 1967 film Frankenstein Created Women.

Beavis' television work included roles in Z-Cars, Emergency Ward 10, Crown Court, The Liver Birds, The Onedin Line, Shine on Harvey Moon, The Bill, Casualty and Winners & Losers His last television appearance was in an episode of The Bill in 1991.

== Personal life and death ==
Beavis married teacher Kathleen Atkin, on 27 October 1956, in Manchester; however the couple subsequently separated. They had two children, Hilary in 1957 and Michael in 1959, and the family lived in Manchester. It was during his time on Coronation Street that he fell for his on-screen wife, Doreen Keogh, and the couple began dating in the 1960s. By 1968, Beavis was living in Teddington, south west London. He died on 24 December 1997, in Northampton, at the age of 71.
