= Doreen Keogh =

Irish actress (1924–2017)

- Keogh in character as barmaid Concepta Riley in Coronation Street
- Born: Doreen Sheila Elsie Keogh; 10 April 1924; Dublin, Ireland
- Died: 31 December 2017 (aged 93); Thomastown, County Kilkenny, Ireland
- Occupation: Actress
- Years active: 1945–2007
- Spouses: Frank Singuineau (m. 1956; div. 1963) Jack Jenner (m. 1976)

Doreen Sheila Elsie Keogh (10 April 1924 – 31 December 2017) was an Irish actress of radio, stage, television and film, who was known for roles in numerous television serials and telefilms, but especially as Concepta Riley, the first barmaid at the Rovers Return Inn in the soap opera Coronation Street. Concepta, introduced as an original character in 1960, remained until 1964, with guest returns to the soap in 1967, 1972 and 1975.

== Early life ==
Keogh was born in Dublin, Ireland, to librarian John Keogh and Alice Mullany. She attended the Holy Faith Convent school, in Clontarf, Dublin, where she first started acting, in addition to being a member of the local amateur dramatics society. Keogh left school at the age of 15 to train with the Abbey Theatre School, Dublin, before moving to London during World War II due to her father's job. After moving to London, her first role was playing Christine Horan in The Man from Kilsheelan.

== Career ==
Keogh's first television role came in 1948 as Miss Fulton in the crime drama Death at Newtownstewart. She then appeared in a range of other roles, including The Whiteheaded Boy in 1951 and Emergency Ward 10 in 1960.

=== Coronation Street ===
Keogh took the role of Concepta Riley, an original character and the first barmaid of the Rovers Return Inn in Coronation Street, from 1960 (episode 5) until 1964, with return appearances in 1967, 1972 and 1975. The character was devised by Tony Warren, to provide some variation to the north-of-England accents that dominated among the original cast.

Riley married Harry Hewitt (Ivan Beavis), a widowed bus inspector, in 1961, and became a stepmother to his daughter, Lucille Hewitt (Jennifer Moss). Keogh was written out of the serial in 1964, when the character and her family returned to Ireland. The departure was part of a cull of more than half-a-dozen characters by Coronation Street's new producer, Tim Aspinall, which also included the death of Martha Longhurst (Lynne Carol).

Keogh made several brief returns to Coronation Street. In 1967, Concepta returned with her husband Harry for Elsie Tanner's (Pat Phoenix) wedding, a storyline that saw Harry crushed to death by Len Fairclough’s (Peter Adamson) van after a jack collapsed. Five years later, in 1972, Keogh made another return, with her character marrying Sean Regan (Tony Doyle). In 1975, Concepta admitted to Annie Walker (Doris Speed) that she knew Sean was unfaithful, but she loved him. In total, Keogh appeared in 320 episodes of Coronation Street.

It was during her first stint in the role that she fell for her on-screen husband, Ivan Beavis, and the couple began dating in the 1960s.

=== Later roles ===
After leaving the soap in 1964, Keogh toured with fellow Coronation Street actors Ivan Beavis, Frank Pemberton, Ruth Holden and Lynne Carol in a farce, Coronation Street On The Road, written by Coronation Street writers Vince Powell and John Finch. However, the tour was a failure.

Keogh's later television roles included starring in Z-Cars in 1974, a 1985 comedy drama, Mary in Inside Out, appearing as Imelda Egan in the BBC Northern Ireland drama Ballykissangel from 1997 to 1999, and as Mary Carroll, the Royles' neighbour in the Granada Television comedy The Royle Family between 1998 and 2006. She also had recurring roles in Father Ted and Cold Feet. In Ireland, she became an original cast member of RTÉ's soap opera Fair City, playing Mary O'Hanlon from 1989 until 1995. Keogh also made a one-off appearance as Mrs Candour in Crossroads in 1969.

She had numerous supporting roles in films, including in the 1996 film Some Mother's Son, playing a mother superior during the 1981 IRA hunger strike. In 1970, she also appeared alongside Julie Andrews and Rock Hudson in the musical Darling Lili.

Keogh coached Barbra Streisand on how to speak with a cockney accent for her 1970 film, On A Clear Day You Can See Forever, despite her being a Dublin native.

In 2007, she appeared in a spoof Irish election commercial on behalf of Alone, a charity for the elderly, as "Betty from the Grey Tigers party". She urged the electorate to vote so that "your granny would be proud of you".

=== Theatre roles ===
Keogh played many theatre roles throughout her career, including in the play Purple Dust in 1953, at Cloyne. She also had roles at West End theatres in London, including a 1973 production of Say Goodnight to Grandma at St Martin's Theatre, Once a Catholic at Wyndham's Theatre in 1978, and Ducking Out in 1982 at the Duke of York's Theatre. Keogh also played Mrs O'Toole in Look Out ... Here Comes Trouble!, in 1978, at the Donmar Warehouse, and Mrs Madigan in Juno and the Paycock, in 1980, at the Aldwych Theatre, as part of the Royal Shakespeare Company.

In Dublin, Keogh appeared in the 1988 Irish premiere of Jeffrey Archer's Beyond Reasonable Doubt at the Gaiety Theatre. In 1992, she took the part of the spiteful mother in Una Pooka at the Tricycle Theatre, Kilburn, London, with later roles including The Silver Tassie, at the Almeida Theatre in 1995, The Importance of Being Earnest at the Abbey Theatre in 1997 and Brian Friel's version of Chekhov's The Three Sisters at Chichester Festival Theatre in 2001.

== Personal life and death ==
Keogh married actor Frank Singuineau in 1954; however, the marriage ended in divorce in 1963. In 1976, she married her second husband, Jack Jenner, and the couple remained married until Keogh's death. Neither marriage produced children. When she was not acting, Keogh renovated homes with her husband. She was a supporter of Liverpool Football Club and animal welfare charities. Keogh lived in Kent, then County Wicklow, and kept dogs, donkeys and ducks.

Keogh had Alzheimer's disease and died on 31 December 2017, aged 93, at St Columba's Hospital, in Thomastown, County Kilkenny, Ireland. Her funeral took place at St Colmcille's Church, Inistioge, County Kilkenny on 4 January 2018. She is buried in Cappagh Cemetery, Ireland.

== Filmography ==
=== Television ===
Year	Title	Role	Notes
1948	Death at Newtownstewart	Miss. Fulton	Television film
1950	Lady Precious Stream	Maid	Television film
1951	The Whiteheaded Boy	Delia Duffy	Television film
1953	Shadow and Substance	Thomasina Concannon	Television film
1955	Sunday Night Theatre	Margaret	Episode: "A Dream of Treason"
1956	Big City	Market customer	Episode: "London - Nobby Clark and Showgirl"
1957	Boyd Q.C.		Episode: "The Light Tackle Job"
1957	Young Chippie	Mollie Block	Television film
1958	Long Distance	Telephone operator	Television film
1959	The Men from Room 13	Miss. Manifold	Episode: "The Man Who Stole Cameos: Part 2"
1960	Emergency Ward 10		Episode: #1.309
1960	Spycatcher	Mrs. Winch	Episode: "Neutral Ground"
1960	The Citadel	Mrs. Boland	2 episodes
1969	Never Mind the Quality, Feel the Width	Nun	Episode: "And a Brother a Priest"
1969	Parkin's Patch	Fanny Chappel	Episode: "A Pair of Good Shoes"
1971	Speaking of Murder	Mildred	Television film
1972	Crossroads	Mrs. Candour	6 episodes
1974	New Scotland Yard	Miriam Levene	Episode: "The Trojan Horse"
1974	...And Mother Makes Five	Mrs. Inskipp	Episode: "The Matter of Tiny Feet"
1974	The Compliment	Mrs. Brook	Television film
1974	Z-Cars	Miss Harper	Episode: "Old Bones"
1975	The Life of Riley	Sister Esmeralda	Episode: "Oh! Sister"
1960–1975	Coronation Street	Concepta Hewitt/Concepta Riley/Concepta Regan	320 episodes
1978	Oh No It's Selwyn Froggitt	Nurse	Episode: "A Man for One Season"
1983	To the Lighthouse	Mrs. Truscott	Television film
1984	Minder	Mrs. Lynch	Episode: "Rocky Eight and a Half"
1984	Father's Day	Card seller	Episode: "Parents' Day"
1985	Inside Out	Mary	5 episodes
1985	Blue Money	Mrs. Gormley	Television film
1985	Black Silk	Alice	Episode: "The Cause of Liberty"
1986	Hot Metal	Mrs. Beatty	2 episodes
1987	Never Say Die	Mrs. Sagoo	Episode: #1.6
1990	The Real Charlotte	Mrs. Beatty	Episode: #1.2
1989–1990	Fair City	Mrs. O'Hanlon	2 episodes
1990	The Lilac Bus	Mrs. Fitzgerald	Television film
1993	Rides	Therese	Episode: #2.5
1995	The Old Curiosity Shop	Mrs. George	Television film
1995	Moving Story	Mary O'Shea	Episode: "The African Queen"
1996	Pie in the Sky	Ms. Kelly	Episode: "Irish Stew"
1998	Father Ted	Mrs. Doyle's Friend / Mrs. Dineen	2 episodes
1998	Her Own Rules	Mrs. Banks	Television film
1999	Always and Everyone	Rita Ravan	Episode: "Strike Me Down"
1997–1999	Ballykissangel	Imeida Egan	7 episodes
2000	David Copperfield	Mrs. Heep	Television film
2001	Perfect	Nancy	Television film
1998–2003	Cold Feet	Pete's Mum/Audrey Gifford	4 episodes
2004	Pulling Moves	Wardrodes Ma.	Episode: "Claimitis"
2004	Holby City	Edie Veale	Episode: "Striking a Chord"
2005	Cutting It	Mildred Flaherty	3 episodes
2005	The Clinic	Mrs. Clarke	Episode: #3.10
1998–2006	The Royle Family	Mary Carroll	9 episodes

=== Film ===
Year	Title	Role	Notes
1957	Zoe Baby	Mary	
1958	A Night to Remember	Passenger who jumps in the sea	
1966	The Christmas Tree	Mother	
1967	Two a Penny	Mary	
1970	Darling Lili	Emma, the Maid	
1981	Take It or Leave It	Managers Wife	Documentary
1985	Lamb	Landlady Cheap Hotel	
1988	Joyriders	Nun	
1994	Widows' Peak	Mrs. Buckley	
1996	Some Mother's Son	Mother Superior	
1998	Crossmaheart	Mrs. Hardy	
1999	A Loved Divided	Lucy Knipe	
1999	Agnes Browne	Nun in mortuary	
1999	Patterns	Mrs. O'Brien	
2000	The Closer You Get	Mrs. Giovanni	
2003	Mystics	Lily	
2003	Spin the Bottle	Sister Ignatius	
2004	The Wonderful Story of Kelvin Kind	Old lady	
2005	The Honeymooners	Ms. Celestine	
2005	Boy Eats Girl	Mrs. Brumble	
2005	Breakfast on Pluto	Shopkeeper	
2006	Pride and Joy	Hannah O'Brien	
2007	The Wednesdays	Mrs. O	
2007	How About You	Mary	
