= A. K. Grant =

New Zealand writer, historian, critic and humorist

Allan Keith Grant (11 February 1941 – 8 April 2000), generally known by his initials as A.K. Grant, was a New Zealand writer, historian, critic and humorist.

Grant was born in Whanganui, and in 1964 he received his LL.B from the University of Canterbury and moved to London for 12 years. On his return to New Zealand in 1976, he began writing, and released The Paua and the Glory , his history of New Zealand letters in 1982. At the same time he wrote a regular column for the New Zealand Listener.

He also wrote for television, particularly in partnership with David McPhail and Jon Gadsby. Credits include A Week of It, McPhail and Gadsby and Letter to Blanchy.

The A. K. Grant Memorial Trophy was established in October 2000 and is awarded to the best speaker in celebrity debates held alternately at the Christchurch and Otago Arts Festivals.
