= Jeremy Commons =

NZ opera historian, scholar, impresario & librettist (born 1933)

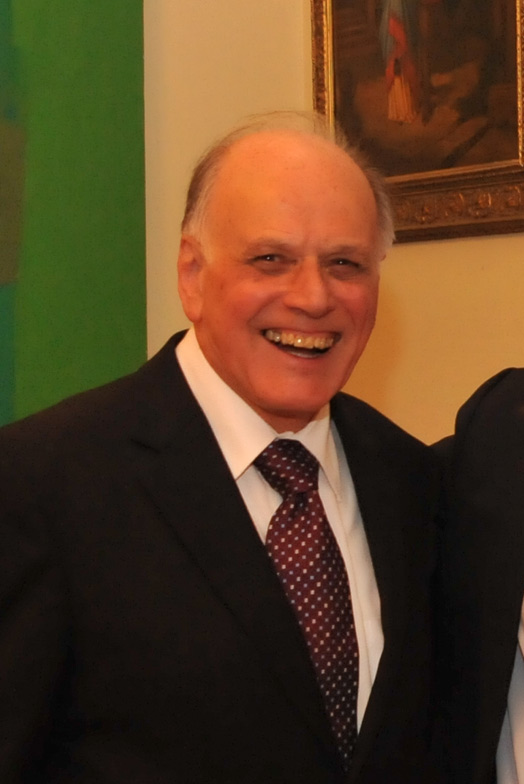
Commons in 2010

Jeremy Paul Axford Commons (born 17 December 1933) is a New Zealand opera historian, scholar, impresario and librettist. He is an authority on nineteenth-century Italian opera and has published major works on the composers Gaetano Donizetti and Nicola Vaccaj.

== Academic career ==
Commons was born in Auckland in 1933. After graduating MA in English from Auckland University and Merton College, Oxford, he spent a year in Italy as an Italian Government scholarship-holder studying early nineteenth century opera.

He returned to New Zealand in 1959 and worked for the Department of External Affairs as a junior diplomat, with postings at New Zealand's Embassy in Paris and the High Commission in London.

He joined the English Department at Victoria University Wellington in 1967 as a Reader and taught English literature, specialising in the Augustan period. Since retiring in 1989, he has devoted his attention full-time to opera-related projects.

In 2006, he was awarded an Honorary Doctorate of Literature from Victoria University for his revival of, and research into, nineteenth-century Italian operas.

== Research and publications ==
He has spent many years in Italian libraries and archives, uncovering not only neglected opera composers and their scores, but also collections of their letters and papers, contemporary accounts and reviews, thus building up an invaluable picture of their lives and productions.

Among other forgotten works he has been instrumental in rediscovering, he has edited in collaboration with the Milanese conductor Daniele Ferrari the opera Il convitato di pietra (1832), a version of the Don Giovanni story written by the Italian composer Giovanni Pacini. The work was given its first modern-day performance at the 2008 Rossini in Wildbad Festival. The work has been recorded by Naxos Records.

His first major scholarly work was the 1,652 page volume The First Performances of the Operas of Donizetti, produced in collaboration with Annalisa Bini and published in Italian in 1997. On his own he subsequently published in 2008 a collection of more than 2000 letters he has transcribed and edited that were written by or to the composer Nicola Vaccaj, a contemporary of Rossini and Donizetti, whose singing exercises are used by singers to this day.

At various times during his career, he has been commissioned to write essays, introductions and notes by opera companies in various parts of the world including Opera Australia, San Francisco and English National Opera. He has worked with leading exponents of Italian opera such as Dame Joan Sutherland and conductor Richard Bonynge on articles to accompany their recordings for Decca Records. Since 1975, he has been a researcher and writer for the London-based company Opera Rara, which has issued award-winning recordings of neglected nineteenth-century Italian operas.

== Opera productions ==
As a producer, Commons has focused on small-scale salon operas, suitable for performance by small groups operating on limited budgets.

He collaborated with the Waikato Opera Group (later Opera Waikato) in presenting operas by Giuseppe Balducci, whose works he had found in the library of the Naples Conservatorium. These included I gelosi (1993), Il noce di Benevento (1995) and Scherzo (1996). He also collaborated with Dunedin's Marama Opera on a production of Chabrier's Une Education manquée (1996).

In 1995, he branched out on his own with a production of Jean-Baptiste Weckerlin's La Laitière de Trianon. Three other Weckerlin salon operas followed: Entre deux Feux! (1997) Le Mariage en poste (1999) and Carmontel (2001), as well as Gustave Nadaud's Le Docteur Vieuxtemps (1998).

In 2002 he established the Sirius Opera label. It ceased operations in 2006.

== Libretti ==
From 1997, he has written libretti for small-scale works in collaboration with several New Zealand composers.

With Dorothy Quita Buchanan he wrote The Mansfield Stories (The Woman at the Store, Miss Brill and The Daughters of the Late Colonel). He mounted the first of these in 1998. Orchestrated versions of all three were presented in 1999. He also collaborated with Buchanan on It Began with a Pony (2003).

With John Drummond he has produced six operas: Mr Polly at the Potwell Inn (2000), A Beleaguered City (2002), Marriage à la Mode (2004), Impersonating Maurice (2005), Mrs Windermere (2006) and The Genteel Pigeons (2006).

He was the co-librettist with Ivan Bootham for The Death of Venus (2002).

He also adapted Ian Cross's novel The God Boy as a libretto for composer Anthony Ritchie. The resulting opera was premiered by the Dunedin Opera Company (Opera Otago) at the 2004 Otago Festival of the Arts, and was subsequently given at the 2006 Canterbury University Platform Arts Festival.

== Other activities ==
He was president of the New Zealand Opera Society from 1981 to 1988, and from 1985 to 1989 he also edited its magazine Opera News. He remains the society's Patron.

He lives in Wellington.

== Sources ==
- Biographical note in Guide to the Jeremy Commons Letters to Solange Bak, 1984–1994
- SOUNZ: Sirius Opera
- 'Don Giovanni' like you've never seen it before
- F.W. Nielsen Wright, Jeremy Commons, Musicologist and Impresario: An Initial Bibliography, Original Books, Wellington, 2002
- "Jeremy Commons honoured", Opera News September–October 2006, p. 8
- Victorious, Summer 2007, Victoria University of Wellington, p. 17
