= Nutcase (film) =

1980 caper film from New Zealand

- Directed by: Roger Donaldson
- Written by: Keith Aberdein; Ian Mune
- Produced by: John Barnett
- Starring: Nevan Rowe
- Cinematography: Graeme Cowley
- Edited by: Michael J. Horton
- Music by: Shade Smith
- Production companies: Aaardvark Films; Endeavor Productions
- Distributed by: Satori
- Release date: 1980
- Running time: 49 minutes
- Country: New Zealand
- Language: English

Nutcase is a 1980 caper film directed by Roger Donaldson. It was filmed around Auckland and was called New Zealand's first Children's feature film. Completed in 1979 it was originally scheduled for a Christmas holidays release that year but was delayed until May school holidays in 1980.

The three child actors starring in the film are Peter Shand and Melissa and Aaron Donaldson. The later two are director Roger Donaldson's children.

== Plot ==
Evil Eva and her gang demand $5,000,000 or they will drop a nuclear bomb into the crater of Rangitoto. Three kids fight back.

== Cast ==
- Melissa Donaldson as Nikki
- Peter Shand as Jamie
- Aaron Donaldson as Crunch
- Jon Gadsby as Chief Inspector Cobblestone
- Nevan Rowe as Evil Eva
- Ian Watkin as Godzilla
- Michael Wilson as McLooney
- Ian Mune as U-Boat Commodore
- Clyde Scott as Murphy
- Jim Coates as Gribble

== Reception ==
Sam Edwards in New Zealand film, 1912-1996 wrote "Nutcase is not a world beater. It has difficulties with dialogue and character which are not significantly reduced by the combination of volume and slapstick gags. A lack of experience shows in script and acting, and a sometimes distracting tendency to lead the audience too obviously into the gags. At the same time, there is strong evidence of the anarchic comic philosophies which were to drive some of the films of Geoff Murphy, and a sense of the ridiculous shared by most New Zealanders who were soon to enjoy New Zealand's most successful movie of the start of the new wave, Murphy's Goodbye Pork Pie."
