= Tony Holden =

Tony Holden may refer to:

- Tony Holden (Home and Away), a character from the Australian soap opera Home and Away
- Tony Holden (director), television producer and director

== See also ==
- Anthony Holden (born 1947), English writer, broadcaster and critic
