= Maurice Duggan =

New Zealand writer (1922–1974)

Maurice Noel Duggan (25 November 1922 – 11 December 1974) was a New Zealand writer of short fiction.

== Life overview ==
Born in Auckland and raised on the city's North Shore, Duggan was mentored by Frank Sargeson and was friendly with many of the important writers of the day, including Greville Texidor, John Reece Cole, Keith Sinclair and Kendrick Smithyman. He married Barbara Platts, a physiotherapist, in February 1946, and they had one son, Nicholas.

Duggan displayed no interest in literature as a child, but the loss of his left leg in 1940 through acute osteomyelitis generated his desire to write. He later contracted tuberculosis while visiting Spain in late 1952. In 1960 Duggan was the second recipient of the newly established Robert Burns Fellowship (the first was Ian Cross), which provided a writer with a lecturer's salary for one year at Otago University. During his year as Burns Fellow, Duggan worked on his unpublished novel The Burning Miss Bratby, and the short story 'Riley's Handbook.' From 1961 Duggan worked in advertising, eventually becoming a member of the Board of Directors of the firm, J. Inglis Wright. He received the New Zealand Literary Fund Scholarship in 1966 and had a year free from advertising work to concentrate on fiction. A crisis with alcoholism precipitated Duggan's resignation from advertising in late 1972, and after a period of painful but successful recovery he learned in late 1973 that he had contracted cancer.

Duggan was primarily a stylist. His story 'Six Place Names and a Girl,' to which Sargeson contributed the title, was an early success, with its minimal plot and its brief, evocative descriptions of the Hauraki Plains. It was published in Charles Brasch's quarterly, Landfall, in 1949, as was most of Duggan's later fiction. In the early 1960s Duggan published two stories in Landfall, ‘Riley’s Handbook’ and ‘Along Rideout Road that Summer,’ which moved New Zealand literature decisively away from its long-dominant tradition of social realism.

== Literary works ==
=== Short story collections ===
- Immanuel's Land (1956)
- Summer in the Gravel Pit (1965)
- O'Leary's Orchard (1970)
- Collected Stories (1981) edited by C.K. Stead

=== Children’s literature ===
- Falter Tom and the Water Boy (1957)
- The Fabulous McFanes and Other Children’s Stories (1974)

=== Poetry ===
- A Voice for the Minotaur: Selected Poems (2001)

=== Unpublished works ===
- The Burning Miss Bratby

=== Short stories ===
Title	Publication	Collected in
"Faith of Our Fathers"	Barjai 19 (1945)	Collected Stories
"Machinery Me"	Anvil 1 (September 1945)	Collected Stories
"Notes on an Abstract Arachnid"	Speaking for Ourselves, ed. Sargeson (1945)	Collected Stories
"Still Life" aka "Short Story"	Book 7 (February 1946)	Collected Stories
"Old Man"	Anvil 2 (June 1946)	Collected Stories
"Conversation Piece"	Book 9 (July 1947)	Collected Stories
"That Long, Long Road"	Kiwi (1947)	Collected Stories
"Sunbrown"	Kiwi (1948)	Collected Stories
"Listen to the Mocking Bird"	Kiwi (1948)	Collected Stories
"Six Place Names and a Girl"	Landfall 9 (March 1949)	Immanuel's Land
"Wheels to Glory"	New Zealand Listener (April 6, 1950)	-
"A Small Story" aka "Each Day Has Its Own Rules"	New Zealand Listener (April 6, 1950)	Immanuel's Land
"Guardian"	Points 11-12 (Winter 1951)	Immanuel's Land
"Race Day"	New Zealand Listener (February 22, 1952)	Immanuel's Land
"The Killer"	New Zealand Listener (March 28, 1952)	Immanuel's Land
"Now Is the Hour"	Here & Now (May 1953)	Immanuel's Land
"In Youth Is Pleasure"	Landfall 28 (December 1953)	Immanuel's Land
"The Life and Death of an Unknown Pioneer"	Here & Now (July 1954)	-
"Voyage"	Landfall 19 (September 1951); Landfall 24 (December 1952); Landfall 31 (September 1954)	Immanuel's Land
"Chapter"	Landfall 34 (June 1955)	Immanuel's Land
"Towards the Mountains"	Numbers 3 (June 1955)	Immanuel's Land
"Salvation Sunday"	Immanuel's Land (1956)	Immanuel's Land
"The Deposition" aka "Book One: A Fragment of a Work Abandoned"	Numbers 8 (July 1958)	Summer in the Gravel Pit
"The Departure"	Image 5 (April 1959)	Summer in the Gravel Pit
"The Wits of Willie Graves"	University of Otago Review (1960)	Summer in the Gravel Pit
"Blues for Miss Laverty"	Landfall 56 (December 1960)	Summer in the Gravel Pit
"Riley's Handbook"	Landfall 60 (December 1961)	O'Leary's Orchard
"Along Rideout Road That Summer"	Landfall 65 (March 1963)	Summer in the Gravel Pit
"For the Love of Rupert"	Summer in the Gravel Pit (1965)	Summer in the Gravel Pit
"O'Leary's Orchard"	Landfall 81 (March 1967)	O'Leary's Orchard
"An Appetite for Flowers"	Landfall 83 (September 1967)	O'Leary's Orchard
"The Magsman Miscellany"	New Zealand Short Stories: Fourth Series (1984)	Collected Stories

"Blues for Miss Laverty" was adapted by Alan Smythe for an episode of the 1976 anthology television series Winners & Losers
