= Bruce Allpress =

New Zealand actor (1930–2020)

- As Aldor at Helm's Deep, 2000
- Born: Bruce Robert Allpress; 25 August 1930; Dunedin, New Zealand
- Died: 23 April 2020 (aged 89); Auckland, New Zealand
- Occupation: Actor

Bruce Robert Allpress (25 August 1930 – 23 April 2020) was a New Zealand actor.

== Biography ==
Allpress grew up in Dunedin, the second son of William and Gladys Allpress. He began performing in the 1960s in a vaudeville minstrel show called the Cheeseman Singer Series. He began working in television drama with a role in the series Hunter's Gold, then spent several years as a regular character on the late 1970s soap opera Close to Home.

He appeared in many television dramas and also presented on television and radio productions. In the mid-1980s, he was a regular on The Billy T. James Show, as well as featuring alongside Tommy Lee Jones in the pirate adventure film Nate and Hayes. He also played the role of a blind piano tuner in The Piano (1993) directed by Jane Campion. His most known role is Aldor, archer of Rohan that accidentally shot the first Uruk-hai from their army in the 2002 film The Lord of the Rings: The Two Towers.

Allpress died of amyotrophic lateral sclerosis at the age of 89 on 23 April 2020.

== Awards ==
In 1981 and 1983, Allpress was awarded the Feltex Television Award for Best Actor in the series Jocko.

== Filmography ==
Year	Title	Role	Notes
1981	Beyond Reasonable Doubt	Detective Sam Keith	
1981	Bad Blood	Inspector Calwell	
1982	The Scarecrow	Uncle Athol	
1983	Nate and Hayes	Mr. Blake	
1985	Came a Hot Friday	Don's Dad	
1985	Should I Be Good?	Neville Oswald	
1987	Erebus: The Aftermath	Peter Grundy	TV miniseries
1990	The Shrimp on the Barbie	Mr. Ridley	
1993	The Piano	Blind Piano Tuner	
2002	The Lord of the Rings: The Two Towers	Aldor	
2006	Ozzie	Charles "Charlie" Foster	
2007	The Water Horse: Legend of the Deep	Jock McGowan	
2008	Power Rangers Jungle Fury	Master Phant	
2011	No Rest for the Wicked	Mr. Maxwell	
