= A Week of It =

- Directed by: Tony Holden; John Wansbrough
- Starring: Ken Ellis; David McPhail; Chris McVeigh; Jon Gadsby; Stuart Devenie; Peter Rowley; Annie Whittle; Russell Smith
- Country of origin: New Zealand
- Original language: English
- No. of series: 3

Production
- Producer: David McPhail
- Editors: Errol Stevenson; Bruce Barton

Original release
- Network: South Pacific Television
- Release: 4 July 1977 – 20 December 1979

A Week of It is a New Zealand television series screened from 1977 to 1979. A comedy sketch show, the series relied heavily on political satire, and as such was often written very shortly before it screened. Although it only ran for three years, the show was very popular, and launched the careers of many New Zealand entertainers, most notably David McPhail and Jon Gadsby.

The show was screened on South Pacific Television (later to become TV2) and produced in Christchurch, with the first episode airing on 4 July 1977, and was groundbreaking for New Zealand television. Despite satirical series lampooning current politics having run overseas for many years (notably the United Kingdom's That Was the Week That Was), they were a novelty in New Zealand, with only John Clarke's creation Fred Dagg having preceded A Week of It. The show's regular cast included McPhail (who also produced the show), Gadsby, singer and comedian Annie Whittle, straight-man/introducer Ken Ellis, Chris McVeigh, and Peter Rowley. The show's main writers were A.K. Grant and McPhail, with other writing input coming from Ellis, Gadsby, McVeigh, and Peter Hawes. The show was directed by Tony Holden.

Much of the satire revolved around politicians of the time, with David McPhail regularly impersonating then-prime minister Sir Rob Muldoon, and Peter Rowley appearing as the Leader of the Opposition Bill Rowling. The show featured musical numbers as well, many of them performed by Gadsby and/or Whittle.

The first series of seven shows aired in mid 1977, with the bulk of the material written in a hectic 48-hour period before screening. Though South Pacific Television were initially not keen to extend the show to a second season, the intervention of the network's CEO Allan Martin saw a second and third series being made. The series won three awards at the 1978 New Zealand television award. The show popularised the catchphrase "Jeez, Wayne", still heard in New Zealand used as a reaction to another person's comments or actions to indicate disbelief.

McPhail and Gadsby later went on to create and star in their own eponymous series, McPhail and Gadsby.
