= Don Selwyn =

New Zealand actor and filmmaker (1935–2007)

Don Selwyn ONZM
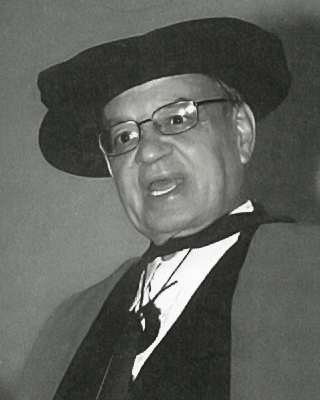
- Selwyn in 2002
- Born: Don Charles Selwyn; 22 November 1935; Taumarunui, New Zealand
- Died: 13 April 2007 (aged 71); Auckland, New Zealand
- Occupations: Actor, filmmaker

Don Charles Selwyn ONZM (22 November 1935 – 13 April 2007) was a Māori actor and filmmaker from New Zealand. He was a founding member of the New Zealand Māori Theatre Trust and directed the 2002 film Te tangata whai rawa o Weneti (The Maori Merchant of Venice), the first Māori language feature film with English subtitles.

== Life ==
Born of Ngāti Kurī, Ngati Hine, Te Rarawa, Te Aupōuri, Ngai Takoto and Ngati Awa descent, Selwyn grew up in Taumarunui and began his professional life as a teacher.

In 1967, Selwyn acted in The Golden Lover at Downstage Theatre directed by Richard Campion alongside Wi Kuki Kaa and Bob Hirini. Also on stage produced by Downstage Theatre and directed by Campion and designed by Raymond Boyce, Selwyn was in Othello with a cast of 17 including Peter Vere-Jones and Elric Hooper in 1976. It was so popular it transferred to the Opera House. He appeared in an episode of Ngaio Marsh Theatre in 1977. In 1984, he began a film and television training course for Māori and Pacific Islanders He Taonga i Tawhiti (Gifts from Afar). In 1992 Ruth Kaupua Panapa and Selwyn co-founded He Taonga Films.

Te tangata whai rawa o Weneti (The Maori Merchant of Venice) (2002) directed by Selwyn was the first Māori language feature film, it was produced by He Taonga Films. He had previously staged it as a play in 1990 at the Koanga Festival. It had been translated from Shakespeare's Merchant of Venice by Pei Te Hurinui Jones in 1945. The film was produced to upskill Māori in the film industry.

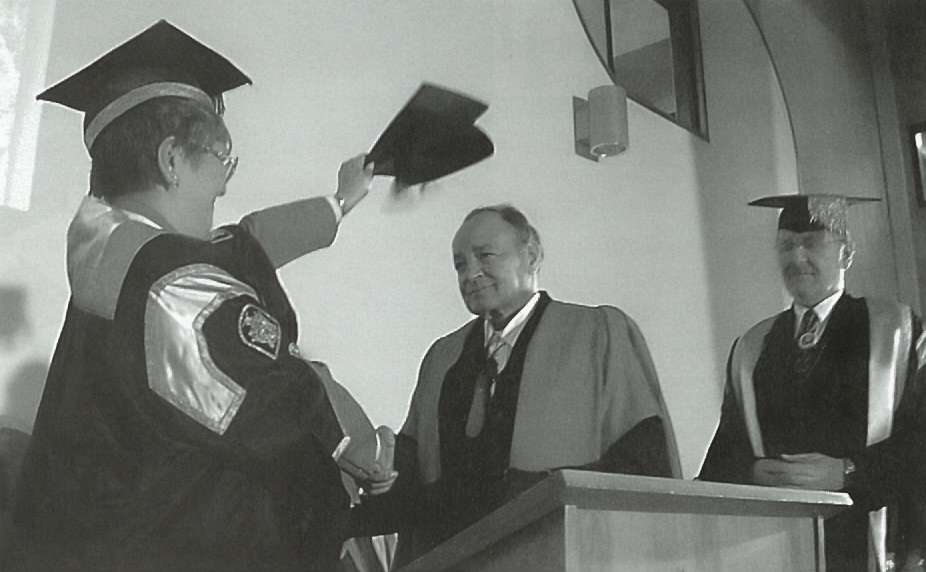
Selwyn being conferred an honorary doctorate by Massey University chancellor Morva Croxson in May 2002, while vice-chancellor James McWha looks on

In the 1999 New Year Honours, Selwyn was appointed an Officer of the New Zealand Order of Merit, for services to theatre, film and television. He was conferred an honorary DLit degree by Massey University in 2002. In 2003, at the New Zealand Film Awards, Selwyn was presented with a lifetime achievement award. In 2007, the Arts Foundation of New Zealand selected him for an Icon Award, which was awarded to him privately shortly before he died.

== Selected filmography ==
- Rangi's Catch (1973) as Mr. Rukuhia
- Big Brother, Little Sister (1976) as Pera
- Sleeping Dogs (1977) as Taupiri
- Came a Hot Friday (1985) as Norm
- My Letter to George (1986) as Joseph
- The Last Tattoo (1994) as Bill Davin
- Te tangata whai rawa o Weneti (The Maori Merchant of Venice) (2002) - director
