= Rangi's Catch =

1972 New Zealand children's film by Michael Forlong

- Theatrical poster
- Directed by: Michael Forlong
- Written by: Michael Forlong
- Based on: Margaret Ford book
- Produced by: Michael Forlong
- Starring: Temuera Morrison; Ian Mune
- Release date: 1972
- Running time: 72 minutes (theatre); 128 minutes (TV series)
- Countries: United Kingdom; New Zealand
- Language: English

Rangi's Catch is a 1972 children's adventure film directed by Michael Forlong. It was based on a book by Margaret Ford. The eponymous role is played by a young Temuera Morrison in his first role. Originally made as eight episodes for television, it was re-edited and re-cut for a theatrical release. The series was also broadcast in Czechoslovakia with dubbing in Slovak language during the 1970s and 1980s (Rangiho úlovok)

== Plot ==
Four children on a remote sheep station in the South Island of New Zealand hear of the escape of two convicts, and realise that the crooks are responsible for burgling their house while they were swimming. They pursue the crooks, and despite being detained by the police help catch the crooks and their stolen money hidden in a cave, so they are rewarded. They return to their idyllic rural existence.

== Cast ==
- Temuera Morrison as Rangi
- Andrew Kerr as Johnny Murray
- Kate Forlong as Jane Murray
- Vernon Hill as Hemi
- Ian Mune as Jake, crook
- Michael Woolf as Bill, crook
- Don Selwyn as Mr. Rukuhia
- Hannah Morrison as Mrs. Rukuhia
- Peter Vere-Jones as Mr. Murray
- Christine Elsdon as Mrs. Murray

== Production ==
The film was sponsored by the Children's Film Foundation.

The eight television episodes were:

- 1. The Mysterious Campers
- 2. Escaped Convicts
- 3. Escape and Capture
- 4. Caught At Sea
- 5. Packed In The Boat
- 6. Terror In The Caves
- 7. Jet Boat
- 8. Rangi's Catch

== Reception ==
The Monthly Film Bulletin wrote: "It's a rare children's film which manages to be entertaining and educational, but Rangi's Catch succeeds in telling an exciting story and in teaching some incidental geography along the way. The narrative device of the chase provides director Michael Forlong (who also wrote the script) with an opportunity to show some of the scenic beauty of his native New Zealand, and he also integrates some of the country's more interesting features into the plot, having the convicts finally spotted at a Maori gathering, and using the mud pools and geysers of the Rotorua thermal areas as the scene of the climactic chase. The film also offers a taste of life on a remote sheep farm: the children, Maori and white, do their lessons together at the kitchen table, with the radio as their teacher; the only transport is by horse, and excursions to the nearest town are made by mail-boat. The story moves along well, and – an essential ingredient of any adventure serial – generates enough suspense at the end of each episode to maintain interest until the next. It is, moreover, beautifully photographed, with some splendid aerial and underwater shots and a very sinister sequence in the Waitomo caves, and accompanied by an interesting and original musical score. The children, all new to films, turn in polished performances, and little Vernon Hill is irresistible as the younger of the two Maori brothers."
