= Country Kiwi and the Cool City Cat =

- Written by: Margaret Mahy; Jim Hopkins; Dave Wilson; David McPhail
- Directed by: Kim Gabara
- Country of origin: New Zealand
- Original language: English
- No. of seasons: 1
- No. of episodes: 7

Production
- Producer: Kim Gabara
- Running time: 24 minutes
- Production company: TVNZ

Original release
- Release: December 3, 1989 – January 14, 1990

Country Kiwi and the Cool City Cat is a 1989 New Zealand children's television series created by Kim Gabara. It was a puppet show with characters taken from the Goodnight Kiwi cartoon. The show, set in the fictional town of Waiwhataweka, used half metre tall puppets created by puppet master Dave Johnstone based on drawings by Kiwi's creator Bruce Carter. Script writers were Margaret Mahy, Jim Hopkins, Dave Wilson and David McPhail.

A con artist cat finds himself in Waiwhataweka and befriends a local Kiwi.
