= Letter to Blanchy =

- Genre: Comedy
- Written by: A. K. Grant; David McPhail; Jon Gadsby
- Directed by: Brendon Butt
- Starring: David McPhail; Jon Gadsby; Peter Rowley
- Theme music composer: Stephen McCurdy
- Country of origin: New Zealand
- Original language: English
- No. of series: 3
- No. of episodes: 31 + Pilot

Production
- Executive producers: Tom Parkinson; Simon Barnes
- Producer: Ray Lillis
- Cinematography: Gary Moore
- Editor: Roger Grant
- Production company: Isambard Productions

Original release
- Network: TV One
- Release: 15 May 1995 – 4 October 1997

Letter to Blanchy is a 1990s New Zealand television comedy series written by A. K. Grant and David McPhail, starring McPhail with Jon Gadsby and Peter Rowley as three smalltown Kiwi blokes, Barry (Gadsby), Derek (McPhail) and Ray (Rowley). A situation comedy where three unlikely characters commit various outrages on the property (and good nature) of their long-suffering friend Blanchy. Barry starts each episode by reading a letter to his unseen mate Blanchy; generally a letter of apology or explanation. They drink beer in a seedy bar and cause havoc with their well-intentioned schemes. Described as "a concept whose time had come – about 20 years ago" or as "Last of the Summer Wine" as written by Barry Crump.

== Production history ==
In the late 1980s, TVNZ made a pilot which was never shown. Then in 1989 TV3 screened an hour-episode in the new channel’s first week on Friday 1 December from 7.30 to 8.30 pm. Director Ian Mune said it was a comedy of foibles about people getting into appalling trouble because they’re either cocky or stupid or trying to impress someone or they’re opportunists. No more episodes were made because of financial difficulties.

Three series were screened on TV One in 1995 (7 episodes), 1996 (11 episodes), and 1997 (13 episodes); the episodes were of half an hour.

After three years (and after TV3’s option expired) TVNZ made the first series which got solid ratings, so a second series was commissioned. Although shot in Auckland, and written by McPhail and Grant from Christchurch, it is set in a kinder, gentler small town in New Zealand called Nettleton, where back doors could be left unlocked.

In September 1996 a third series was commissioned; filmed in January it screened in winter 1997. The series won a New Zealand Film and Television Award for the script of the episode "Stir Crazy", and proved that the series appeal was not restricted to the over-55s. Gadsby said that the series appealed to the same audience as Heartland and the Topp Twins, and Grant said that most families have a brother-in-law who borrows your gear and buggers everything up.

A book (with eight chapters) was published in 1997, and a theatre tour made in 2008.

== Reception ==
For the last two series Letter to Blanchy averaged 640,700 per episode which was very high viewership.

== Controversy ==
Funding was originally refused by the Broadcasting Commission; Ruth Hartley calling it "racist and sexist", then its successor New Zealand on Air backed it.

== Cast ==
- David McPhail as Derek, an accountant who wants to be one of the boys, and is easily fooled by Barry.
- Jon Gadsby as Barry, a divorced drainage contractor who (unlike Derek) favours short cuts and dodgy deals
- Peter Rowley as Ray, a panelbeater. He has been gong steady with Glenys for five years.
- Ian Mune as Colin in one episode; also directed several episodes
- Jennifer Ward-Lealand as Jane, Barry’s ex in several episodes
