= The Whole of the Moon (film) =

- Directed by: Ian Mune
- Written by: Ian Mune; Richard Lymposs
- Based on: The Whole of the Moon by Duncan Stewart
- Produced by: Murray Newey; Micheline Charest
- Starring: Toby Fisher; Nikki Si'ulepa; Pascale Bussières; Paul Gittins; Jane Thomas
- Cinematography: Warrick Attewell
- Edited by: Jean Beaudoin
- Music by: Daniel Scott
- Production companies: CINAR Films; Tucker Films
- Distributed by: Columbia TriStar Films
- Release date: 6 February 1997
- Running time: 92 minutes
- Countries: New Zealand; Canada
- Language: English

The Whole of the Moon is a 1997 New Zealand/Canadian film about a teenager who is diagnosed with cancer. The film, based on the novel of the same name by Duncan Stewart, was directed by Ian Mune and written by Mune and Lymposs. It stars Toby Fisher, Nikki Si'ulepa, Pascale Bussières, Paul Gittins, and Jane Thomas.

== Plot ==
15-year-old Kirk Mead (Toby Fisher) is a typical fun-loving child, living in Auckland, New Zealand. He likes to hang out with his friend Ronnie (Elliot O'Donnell) and is in a relationship with Tory (Nicola Cliff). One day, he is shockingly diagnosed with cancer. At the hospital, he meets ex-streetkid Marty (Nikki Si'ulepa), who seems to be the exact opposite of him. Despite their differences, Kirk soon develops a first antagonistic, and later friendly relationship with Marty. One night, the two sneak out of the hospital to have one final fling of freedom.

== Cast ==
- Toby Fisher as Kirk Mead
- Nikki Si'ulepa as Marty
- Pascale Bussières as Sarah
- Paul Gittins as Alex Mead
- Jane Thomas as Maureen Mead
- Nicola Cliff as Tory Taylor
- Elliot O'Donnell as Ronnie
- Carl Rand as Mr. Dixon
- Greg Johnson as Mr. Cooper
- Olie Rennie as Peter

== Production ==
The Whole of the Moon was filmed in Auckland, New Zealand.
