= The Amazing Extraordinary Friends =

- The Amazing Extraordinary Friends Intertitle
- Created by: Stephen Campbell
- Starring: Carl Dixon; Hannah Marshall; David McPhail
- Country of origin: New Zealand
- No. of seasons: 3
- No. of episodes: 40

Production
- Executive producer: Stephen Campbell
- Producers: John Harris, Matt McPhail
- Running time: 30 minutes (including adverts)

Original release
- Network: TV2 (TVNZ)
- Release: 7 July 2007 – January 2011

The Amazing Extraordinary Friends is a New Zealand superhero television series featuring the adventures of a modern-day superhero teenage boy and his friends.

The protagonist is a teenage boy called Ben Wilson who finds out about a superhero insignia which gives him powers. He has difficulty with them, especially flight and using eye lasers at first, but soon learns to control them fairly well. His grandfather is also a superhero, and this is how he comes to acquire the insignia. His mother hates all the superhero business going on for the sake of safety, but his father and stepfather both encourage him, his father being the previous superhero in Ben's position, Captain Xtraordinary or simply Captain X, and his stepfather being the son of a supervillain, The Comedian. The position, it is found out in the show, has been held by many heroes in the past.

The villains in the series are Nemesis, a group led by an old villain and a recently converted hero, Ice, who used to be Blaze in her former era working alongside the former Captain X. The Nemesis group operate in a skyscraper office block known as Nemesis Headquarters and use computers, suggesting they have updated since the old times. A loose idea of a "new age of superheroes" is suggested throughout the series. They use stormtroopers with skull-like masks and breathing apparatus. The Nemesis group have many villains under their wing and it is run by Renfield, the main villain in the series whom Ice assists in his constant plan to get the insignia.

Ben Wilson and his friends attend City Central College, run by Principal Locum. At school Ben and his friends are bullied. Often the plot will involve the school or an event at it.

The plot generally involves the insignia, the main target for possession by Nemesis. It is discovered in the series that the power giving insignia, which merges with a person's chest and, in the case of Captain Xtraordinary, creates a costume as well, is made of Unobtainium, a highly unstable element created by an exiled university scientist. Unobtainium can also, it is discovered, power a ready-made suit. The insignia was created using the Unobtainium, which only existed naturally during a short period after the creation of the universe. Aliens claim to have made it and these resemble humans, even using English as their language of choice.

The show uses several minor devices from the classic superhero/supervillain genre, including tags like Nemesis Headquarters or Ben Wilson's House in the same manner as in changing a location in a comic book. Also background music and sound accompaniment is often done in the style of animated superhero series.

The series is set in a fictional city called City Central, filmed in Auckland.

It is currently being shown on ABC television in Australia on weekdays at 5:50 pm. In America, the show airs on Universal Kids.

Season 3 was shot in 2008 but was not shown until 2010.

The Wired Chronicles, an online miniseries based on the show, is currently available to view on TVNZ on demand. Another online miniseries, Origins, is also planned.

== Characters ==
Character	Actor
Ben Wilson/Captain X	Carl Dixon
Roy Bottle/Nitelite	Patrick Morrison
Shani Rai/Wired	Robyn Maclean
Harry Seaforth/Green Termite	David McPhail
Vicki Van Horton	Hannah Marshall
Dominic Renfield	Stuart Devenie
Blaze/Ice	Tyler-Jane Mitchel
Laura Wilson	Madeleine Lynch
Dave Ruben	John Leigh
Mayor Jackson	Peter Feeney
Victor Zeno	Johnny Barker
Cosmonaut/Alien#2	Campbell Cooley
