= The God Boy =

Book by Ian Cross, adapted into opera by Jeremy Commons and Anthony Ritchie

- Author: Ian Cross
- Language: English
- Publisher: André Deutsch
- Publication date: 1957
- Publication place: New Zealand
- Media type: Novel
- Pages: 189

The God Boy is a novel written by Ian Cross, first published in 1957 and reprinted in 2003.

Cross, who was a journalist, based the story on the real lives of juvenile delinquents he encountered in his work.

The book was adapted as an opera by librettist Jeremy Commons and composer Anthony Ritchie in 2004 and performed by Opera Otago in the Otago Festival of the Arts.

The 1976 film version (released on DVD in 2010) starred Jamie Higgins as Jimmy Sullivan. Made by TV One (New Zealand) on 16 mm it was produced and directed by Murray Reece, with the screenplay by Ian Mune.

== Synopsis ==
Jimmy Sullivan is an eleven-year-old boy who lives in the town of Raggleton, an everyday small town community in New Zealand. Jimmy is not like other boys his age. The home that he lives in is filled with constant arguing and bitterness between his parents. He tries to ignore these events by using special protection tricks to isolate himself from his own situation. One Tuesday afternoon he breaks down and turns violent - abusing the elderly, smashing windows and throwing rocks at Bloody Jack. Eventually his home environment changes when his mother kills his father. He is sent to a Roman Catholic boarding school and leads a very uncertain life, becoming disillusioned with God.
