= Winners & Losers (New Zealand TV series) =

- Created by: Ian Mune; Roger Donaldson
- Country of origin: New Zealand
- Original language: English
- No. of seasons: 1
- No. of episodes: 7

Production
- Producers: Ian Mune; Roger Donaldson
- Editors: Jamie Selkirk; Simon Reece; Mike Horton; Howard Taylor
- Running time: 30 minutes

Original release
- Release: April 5 – May 10, 1976

Winners & Losers is a 1976 New Zealand anthology television series showing a series of locally produced half hour long films. It was created by Roger Donaldson and Ian Mune.

Aardvark Films created a television adaptation of Katherine Mansfield's story "The Woman at the Store", airing in March 1975. Due to the success of this play they were able to make six more films under the title of Winners & Losers. Each play was an adaptation of a story from a well known New Zealand writer. The Woman at the Store was included in the series when it was sold at Cannes.

40 years after the production the films were all digitally restored, with work headed by Jon Newell, working with Mune, Donaldson and cinematographer Graeme Cowley.

== Episodes ==
- The Woman at the Store

Story by Katherine Mansfield, adapted by Peter Hansard and Ian Mune. Director: Roger Donaldson and Ian Mune

Three travellers encounter a woman and child. It stars Jeremy Stephens, Ian Mune, Ilona Rodgers, Ann Flannery and Niccola Sanderson

- Shining with the Shiner

Story by John A. Lee, adapted by Roger Simpson. Director: Roger Donaldson and Ian Mune

In 1900 Ned "Shiner" Slattery refuses to work but always find a way to get food and lodgings. Stars Ivan Beavis, Ian Mune, Barry Moody and Harold Kissin.

- Big Brother, Little Sister

Story by Witi Ihimaera, adapted by Roger Simpson. Director: Ian Mune.

Two children try rto run away. Stars Dale Williams, Julie Wehipeihana, Sue Hansen, Don Selwyn and Miritanga Hughes. A. K. Grant from the Press called it "outstandingly good" saying "Much Of the success of "Big Brother, Little Sister" was due to the appealing performance of Julie Wehipeihana as Janey, but the main strength of the programme lay in the fact that it made us feel it was true.

- Blues for Miss Laverty

Story by Maurice Duggan, adapted by Alan Smythe. Director: Roger Donaldson and Ian Mune

A lonely violin teacher invites her student's father over for dinner. Stars Yvonne Lawley, Russell Duncan, Leslie Day and Pam Merwood

- A Lawful Excuse

Story by Barry Crump, adapted by Ross Jolly, Ian Mune and Roger Donaldson. Director: Roger Donaldson

A murderer is released because his crime occurred between the time capital punishment was repealed and the introduction of new laws. Stars Ian Mune and Ivan Beavis. R. T. Brittenden of the Press said "Here Ian Mune and Ivan Beavis gave the series a nice balance with their light-hearted comic romp. It was not hilarious, but it had some delicious moments."

- A Great Day

Story by Frank Sargeson, adapted by Arthur Baysting. Director: Ian Mune

Two men head out into the harbour in a boat to fish. A friendly interrogation ensues. Stars William Smith and David Weatherley.

- After the Depression

Story by Maurice Shadbolt, adapted by Arthur Baysting. Director: Roger Donaldson

Bill heads to a mining settlement with his wife and child to look for work. Stars Clyde Scott, Jane Dyer and Cass Donaldson. Shirley Maddock in the Listener said that it brought the series "to so fine a conclusion" saying "The cast made the most of their opportunities — especially the remarkable little four-year-old boy."

== Awards ==
Feltex Television Awards 1976

- Best Script: Peter Hansard and Ian Mune, The Woman at the Store - won
- Best Actress: Ilona Rodgers, The Woman at the Store and Close to Home - won
- Best Actress: Anne Flannery, The Woman at the Store - nominated
- Nominated for Best Actor: Ian Mune, The Woman at the Store - nominated

Feltex Television Awards 1977

- Best Actor: Ian Mune, Winners & Losers and Moynihan

1976 Asian Young Filmmaker's Festival (Shiraz, Iran)

- National Iran Radio and Television Golden Prize: Roger Donaldson, After the Depression - won
