= Ozzie (2006 film) =

- Directed by: William Tannen
- Produced by: Chuck Binder; Dale G. Bradley; Grant Bradley; Jozsef Fityus; Sylvia Koschorreck; Cyndy Kuipers; Michael Lach; George Lascu; Thomas Mulack; Dieter Stempnierwsky; Wolfram Tichy; Alfred Tolle
- Starring: Spencer Breslin; Joan Collins; Ralf Moeller; Peter Rowley; Rachel Hunter; Bruce Allpress
- Cinematography: Neil Cervin
- Edited by: Douglas Braddock; Julia Wiedwald; Georgia Wyss
- Music by: Florian Appl; Mathias Grosch; Michael Koschorrek
- Production companies: Lightning Entertainment; Daybreak Pacific Films; Vif Babelsberger Filmproduktion
- Release date: 2006
- Running time: 87 minutes
- Countries: New Zealand; Germany
- Language: English

Ozzie is a 2006 family comedy film, directed by William Tannen (credited as Bill Tannen), and starring Spencer Breslin, Joan Collins, Ralf Moeller, Peter Rowley, Rachel Hunter, and Bruce Allpress. The film is a coproduction from New-Zealand and Germany and features a koala who has been taught to speak.

== Plot ==
In the Outback of Australia, a koala named Ozzie has been taught how to speak proper English by an Aboriginal boy named Ngundi residing in a village nearby. Having heard of the legend, two goons: Buzz and Tank hired by evil toymaker, Maxine "Max" Happy kidnap the talking koala after two months of searching and take him back to the United States in order to use him as a prototype for a race of talking koalas that could render Max rich and save her company, Wonder Toys from upcoming bankruptcy before the Christmas holidays with a little help from her top scientist, Gilbert using an electronic brain transfer machine.

During the flight, however, Ozzie switches places in bags with an Ozzie koala doll recently given to a boy named Justin Morton as a gift for his 9th birthday by his single mother, Beth working as a stewardess on the plane. When the switch is eventually discovered, Max angrily sends her goons out once again to find the boy and retrieve the real koala this time. In the meantime, Ozzie inadvertently causes a mess in the kitchen when looking for food at night, which Justin gets blamed for and is forced to clean up the next day.

After a hard time on the first day of school, Justin finally discovers Ozzie when he hears him talking in his room and befriends him. Trying to convince his mom and their neighbor, Charles Foster, the creator of Justin's (and Tank's) favorite comic book superheroes, the Avenger Force of the truth about Ozzie fails, which they simply dismiss as plain imagination. Having located Justin's address, Buzz and Tank try various attempts to break in and retrieve Ozzie, but fail due to many difficulties along the way including Tank delightfully meeting Foster in person, leading to Buzz mostly ending up in pain.

Eventually, Buzz and Tank snatch Ozzie from Justin after a long chase on bikes and jet-skis from school till a restaurant. However, due to being a fellow Avenger Force fan, Tank sincerely promises Justin that no one is going to harm Ozzie before leaving with Buzz and taking Ozzie back to their boss. Having been escorted back home by the police, Justin is grounded and forbidden from ever hanging out with Foster again by his mother until he lets go of his "imagination"; thinking that Foster has proven to be a negative influence on her son concerning superheroes.

Realizing that no one will help or even listen to him except for his friends, Darryl and Caitlin having met Ozzie earlier, Justin resolves to rescue Ozzie with his friends' help from Wonder Toys at night before it's too late. Once at Wonder Toys, Justin and his friends are captured and kept locked up until Max can deal with them permanently once she's done with Ozzie. Nevertheless, having had enough of both his boss and partner's abuse and disgusted by their intentions for both Ozzie and the kids, a redeemed Tank knocks Buzz out and frees the kids who free Ozzie before the brain transfer procedure begins. Finally, Max becomes completely brain-fried after Tank shoves her into the brain transfer machine during a struggle and before the police arrive to arrest everyone except Tank who actually called the police earlier.

Justin and his friends are reunited with the former's mother and Foster having also arrived to look for them at Wonder Toys after finding Justin's note earlier and Tank is given admission to Foster's new Avenger Force; much to his delight. Then, Justin travels back to Australia with his mother and Foster and reunites Ozzie with Ngundi in his village.

== Cast ==
- Spencer Breslin as Justin Morton
- Steven Kynman as Ozzie (voice)
- Joan Collins as Maxine "Max" Happy
- Ralf Moeller as Tank Emerson
- Rachel Hunter as Beth Morton
- Peter Rowley as Buzz Maroni
- Bruce Allpress as Charles "Charlie" Foster
- Anton Tennet as Darryl
- Steven Riley as Ngundi
- John Leigh as Gilbert
- Rose McIver as Caitlin
- Michael Saccente as Police Officer #1
- Daniel Millaire as Maitre'D
- Beryl Te Wiata as Secretary
- Luciano Saber as Chef

== Release and home media versions ==
Some sources indicate 2005 and even 2001 as release year.

A DVD version was released in 2013.

== Reception ==
J.P. Mangalindan in Entertainment Weekly wrote,

Though occasional scenes are cheer-worthy — Justin and his friends standing up to the school bully, and escaping Collins’ goons on Jet Ski — the film feels more like an after-school special, albeit with notable stars. And while a talking koala is novel, it’s difficult to warm up to the stiff-looking marsupial, more notable for its Aussie accent than any one line of dialogue. So the movie leans heavily on Breslin and Collins to keep things interesting.

A review from The Dove Foundation stated, ”This is a hilarious adventure that will have everyone laughing. Although technology has changed from 2001 and Ozzie would be a little more realistic today than he is in this film, the comedy will be entertaining for the entire family.”

Télé- Loisirs wrote that children would enjoy the film immensely, in particular the final chase scene. Télé Star wrote that, despite its lack of originality, the film was nicely entertaining.
