= Timothy Birdsall =

English cartoonist

- Born: Timothy Birdsall; 10 May 1936; London, England
- Died: 10 June 1963 (aged 27); London, England
- Occupation: Cartoonist
- Known for: That Was the Week that Was, Sunday Times "Little Cartoon"

Timothy Birdsall (10 May 1936 – 10 June 1963) was an English cartoonist.

== Life and work ==
Birdsall was born in London. He attended Sedbergh School in Yorkshire. While an undergraduate at Christ's College, Cambridge, he illustrated Granta and formed part of the late 1950s talented set which included those later to become household names, such as Peter Cook and Ian McKellen.

His first job was with The Sunday Times, where he did the 'Little Cartoon' on the front page. He later became more widely known for his appearances on the BBC's That Was The Week That Was, doing cartoons live in the studio with an ink-marker on paper. He also contributed to Private Eye and was appointed political cartoonist to The Spectator. He regularly caricatured the then prime minister Harold Macmillan, Harold Wilson, and Lord Beaverbrook, who issued a writ against him. Birdsall's cartoons satirised the Profumo scandal, besides the Church of England and rearguard Britain's faulty attempts to emerge into the 'swinging Sixties'. Illness prevented him from doing more than about twenty of these political cartoons, and he succumbed to leukaemia, aged 27. He was survived by his widow, the actress Jocelyn Britton.

After his death the BBC made a tribute programme. Michael Frayn and Bamber Gascoigne organised a posthumous exhibition of his works at the William Ware Gallery in London. His book illustrations include The Theatres of London (1961) by Raymond Mander and Joe Mitchenson, The Party Givers' Book (1959) by Mary Gallati, The World In My House (1960) by Joan Harborne, Really Nurse (1960) and Wake Up Nurse (1963) by Roger Brook, The Day Of The Dog (1962) by Michael Frayn, and France on Ten Words a Day (1963) by H. McCarty-Lee.
