= Roger Donaldson =

Australian-New Zealand filmmaker

Roger Donaldson ONZM
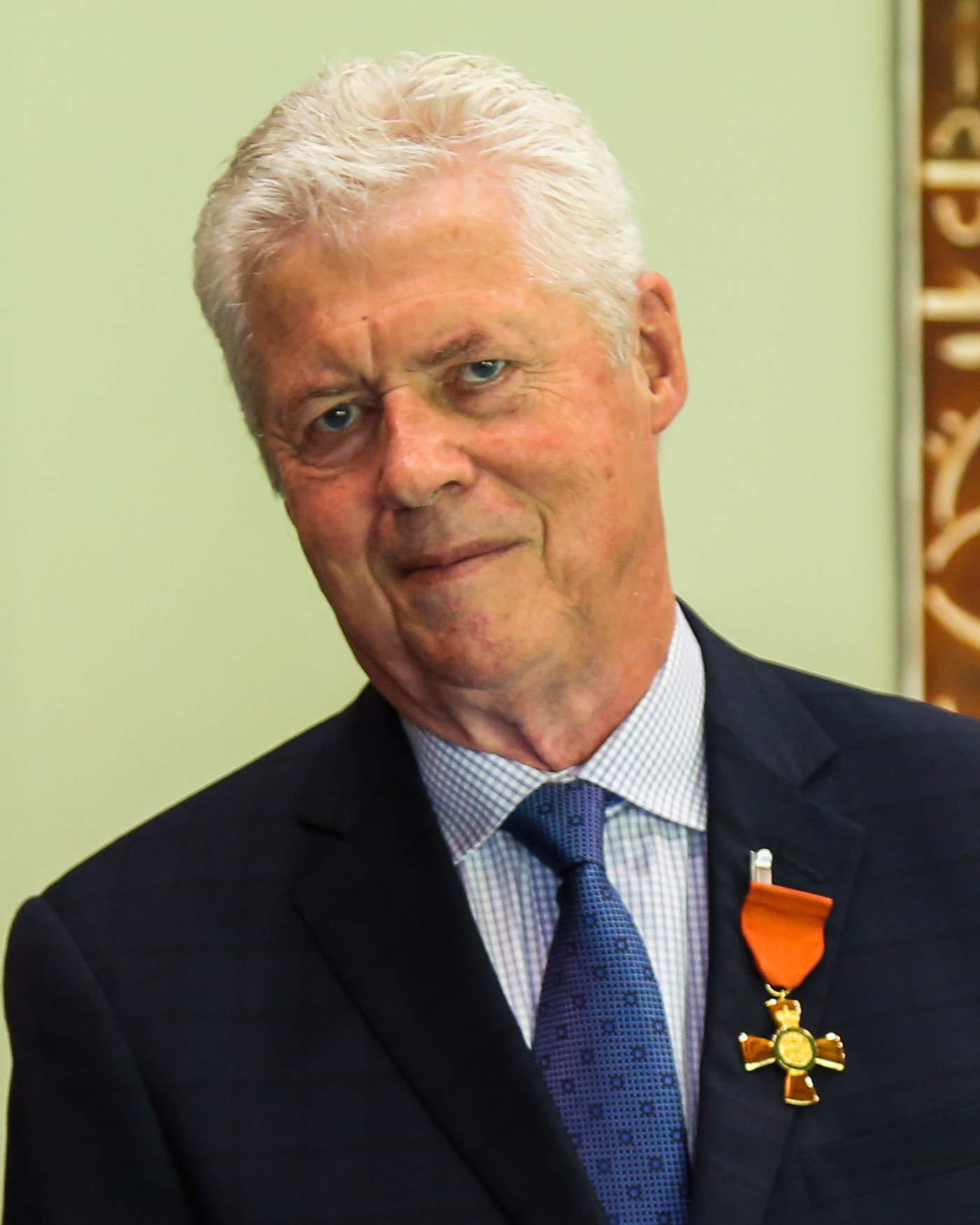
- Donaldson in 2023
- Born: Roger Lindsey Donaldson; 15 November 1945 (age 80); Ballarat, Victoria, Australia
- Occupations: Film director, screenwriter, producer
- Years active: 1977–present
- Relatives: Chris Donaldson (son); India Donaldson (daughter)

Roger Lindsey Donaldson ONZM (born 15 November 1945) is an Australian and New Zealand film director, screenwriter, and producer. His 1977 debut film, Sleeping Dogs, is considered a landmark work of New Zealand cinema, as one of the country’s first films to attract large-scale critical and commercial success. He has subsequently directed 17 feature films, working in Hollywood and the United Kingdom, as well as his native country.

Donaldson’s best-known films include the historical drama The Bounty (1984), the neo-noir No Way Out (1987), the romantic comedy Cocktail (1988), the Cuban Missile Crisis docudrama Thirteen Days (2000), the science-fiction horror film Species (1995), the disaster film Dante's Peak (1997), the Burt Munro biopic The World's Fastest Indian (2005), and the historical thriller The Bank Job (2008).

Donaldson has worked twice each with actors Kevin Costner, Pierce Brosnan, Anthony Hopkins and Michael Madsen. He is a recipient of three New Zealand Film and Television Awards. He is also an AACTA Award and Palme d’Or nominee. At the 2018 Queen's Birthday Honours, Donaldson was appointed an Officer of the New Zealand Order of Merit, for services to film.

== Life and career ==
Donaldson was born in Ballarat, Victoria, where he attended Ballarat High School. In 1965 he emigrated to New Zealand, where he established a small still photography business and began making advertisements. Donaldson was also directing documentaries, including an adventure series featuring Everest-conquering New Zealander, Sir Edmund Hillary, as well as his first ventures into drama. Donaldson and actor/director Ian Mune collaborated on a number of projects for television, including anthology series Winners & Losers, based on short stories by New Zealand authors.

In 1976, Donaldson directed and produced his first feature, Sleeping Dogs. The film starred Mune and Sam Neill as two men fighting for their lives in a totalitarian New Zealand. He followed it with Smash Palace, starring Bruno Lawrence as a man who kidnaps his daughter after his marriage disintegrates.

Donaldson's international break came when producer Dino de Laurentiis invited him to direct an adaptation of Mutiny on the Bounty, after Lawrence of Arabia director David Lean left the project. The film, released as The Bounty, starred Anthony Hopkins as William Bligh and Mel Gibson as mutineer Fletcher Christian. Donaldson was nominated for a Golden Palm at the 1984 Cannes Film Festival for the film.

Donaldson went on to direct many popular and successful movies. His breakthrough American hit was the thriller No Way Out, starring Kevin Costner and Gene Hackman. Cocktail, starring Bryan Brown and Tom Cruise, was panned by critics but did very well at the box office, based largely on Cruise's starpower. The volcano disaster movie Dante's Peak, starring Pierce Brosnan and Linda Hamilton, helped restore Donaldson's status after a string of less successful films. Thirteen Days, a political thriller starring Kevin Costner, adapted The Kennedy Tapes, a book by Ernest R. May and Philip Zelikow, which was a detailed account of the Cuban Missile Crisis. He also directed science fiction tale Species, and in 2003, the Al Pacino and Colin Farrell film The Recruit. Donaldson wrote and directed The World's Fastest Indian, which released in 2005. The film starred Anthony Hopkins and depicted Burt Munro's successful attempts at motorcycle speed records at Bonneville Salt Flats in the 1950s.

His son Chris is a sprinter who has represented New Zealand at the Olympic level in 100m and 200m events. His daughter India is also a filmmaker. Her debut feature Good One made its premiere at the Sundance Film Festival, and also screened at the Cannes Film Festival.

In the 2018 Queen's Birthday Honours, Donaldson was appointed an Officer of the New Zealand Order of Merit, for services to film.

== Filmography ==
=== Film ===
Year	Title	Director	Producer	Writer
1977	Sleeping Dogs	Yes	Yes	No
1980	Nutcase	Yes	No	No
1981	Smash Palace	Yes	Yes	Yes
1984	The Bounty	Yes	No	No
1985	Marie	Yes	No	No
1987	No Way Out	Yes	No	No
1988	Cocktail	Yes	No	No
1990	Cadillac Man	Yes	Yes	No
1992	White Sands	Yes	No	No
1994	The Getaway	Yes	No	No
1995	Species	Yes	No	No
1997	Dante's Peak	Yes	No	No
2000	Thirteen Days	Yes	No	No
2003	The Recruit	Yes	No	No
2005	The World's Fastest Indian	Yes	Yes	Yes
2008	The Bank Job	Yes	No	No
2011	Seeking Justice	Yes	No	No
2014	The November Man	Yes	No	No

Documentary film

Year	Title	Director	Executive Producer
2004	The Making of "Sleeping Dogs"	No	Yes
2017	McLaren	Yes	No

Short film

- Lawyers (2010)

=== Television ===
Year	Title	Director	Producer	Writer	Notes
1971	Burt Munro: Offerings to the God of Speed	Yes	Yes	No	TV Short
1974	Derek	Yes	No	Yes	
1975–1976	Winners & Losers	Yes	Yes	Yes	
1999	Fearless	No	Executive	No	

TV movies

- Survey (1972)
- Jocko (1981)
