= Derek (1974 film) =

- Directed by: Ian Mune; David Mitchell; Roger Donaldson
- Written by: Ian Mune; David Mitchell; Roger Donaldson
- Produced by: Roger Donaldson
- Starring: Ian Mune; Shirley Duke; Ann Webster
- Cinematography: Alan Locke
- Edited by: Roger Donaldson; Alan Locke
- Release date: October 28, 1974
- Running time: 45 min
- Country: New Zealand
- Language: English

Derek is a 1974 New Zealand short film. Written by Roger Donaldson, David Mitchell and Ian Mune, it starred Mune as Derek Begbie. Mune won a 1975 Feltex Award for his role.

Derek was filmed over a weekend on a minimal budget. When it aired on TV a small cut was made.

== Synopsis ==
Derek is being fired from his job of seven years and seeks revenge.

== Cast ==
- Ian Mune as Derek
- Shirley Duke as Alison
- Ann Webster as Faye
- Don Hutchins as Stu
- Lix Coulter as Sheryl

== Reception ==
The Dominion's James Gasson praised Mune but criticised the play saying "if we're going to indulge in bawdiness on the screen, let it be spiced with wit and humour. There's nothing wrong with the belly laugh at an audacious sally into smut as long as it is funny." Dick Campion in the Listener wrote "Ian Mune is really something. Has anybody else his ability to project the New Zealand common man?" Auckland Star reviewer Barry Shaw wrote "Mune's biggest asset is an extremely mobile face."

Filmmaker Costa Botes in his 2022 essay "If there’s a spark to the flame that lit the rocket of New Zealand film in the 1970s, then this little film probably has the best claim to being it. Derek hit me like a round from a howitzer when I first saw it; it was naughty, subversive, and funny."
