= Came a Hot Friday =

1985 film by Ian Mune

- VHS artwork
- Directed by: Ian Mune
- Written by: Ronald Hugh Morrieson (novel); Ian Mune (screen); Dean Parker (screen)
- Starring: Peter Bland; Phillip Gordon; Michael Lawrence; Billy T. James; Marshall Napier; Don Selwyn
- Cinematography: Alun Bollinger
- Edited by: Ken Zemke
- Music by: Stephen McCurdy
- Release dates: 1985 (New Zealand); 4 October 1985 (U.S.)
- Running time: 101 minutes
- Country: New Zealand
- Language: English
- Box office: NZ$950,000

Came a Hot Friday is a 1985 New Zealand comedy film, based on the 1964 novel by Ronald Hugh Morrieson. Directed and co-written by Ian Mune, it became one of the most successful local films released in New Zealand in the 1980s. The film's cast included famed New Zealand comedian Billy T. James.

== Plot summary ==
In 1949 New Zealand, Wes Pennington and Cyril Kidman are two travelling con-men and gamblers who swindle bookies by taking advantage of delayed radio broadcasts of horse racing results. Arriving in the small town of Tainuia, the pair quickly fall out with the local bookie, Norm Cray, and decide to recruit a simple-minded car yard worker, Don Jackson, to place late bets with Cray on their behalf. Dinah, the beautiful wife of Don's boss Dick, catches Wes's eye, while Don admires a local waitress, Esmerelda.

Meanwhile, Sel Bishop, an unscrupulous landlord, is exasperated by a persistent trespasser on his homestead – the "Tainuia Kid", a Māori man with delusions of being a Mexican bandit. As an insurance scam, Bishop has arranged for Morrie, the drunkard brother of Bishop's partner Claire, to burn down Bishop's billiard hall in the town. However, Morrie and Claire – who believed the building was unoccupied – are horrified when the hall's elderly lodger, "Pop" Simon, dies as a result of the fire.

In collusion with Wes and Cyril, who make coded telephone calls to the town's pub, Don manages to win £1,000 (Note: Equivalent to $NZ48,479 in 2024.) from Cray. When he later discovers a note discarded by Don revealing the code, Cray realises he has been defrauded and angrily barges into Don's house, injuring Don's elderly father, who is home alone.

That evening, Sel Bishop hosts a dance for the townsfolk in his large woolshed. Enthused by Don's win, Dick has loaned Don a fine car to take Esmerelda to the dance. Wes attempts to seduce the flirtatious Dinah behind the shed, but they are discovered by her husband Dick, resulting in a fight. Over Cray's objections, Bishop allows Wes to use his share of Don's winnings to win a large sum at Bishop's illicit crown and anchor table, but the local police sergeant raids the shed and the crowd scatters, with Bishop refusing to hand over Wes's winnings. As the Tainuia Kid watches from the bushes, Cray pursues Wes and Cyril in his car, but when the pair flee across a nearby footbridge, Cray accidentally drives onto it, flinging Wes and Cyril into the river below. Don and Esmerelda spend the night in Don's car outside the woolshed.

The following morning, Claire has become anxious that Morrie has gone missing, and when she presses Bishop about this, he throws her out of the house. Don returns home to find his father angry about Cray's home invasion. A panicked Cyril arrives and tells Don that Wes has drowned. However, Wes wakes up on the river bank and is greeted by The Kid. Wes, Cyril, and Don are quickly reunited and befriended by The Kid, a merry but superstitious character who believes that a "Taniwha" (monster) haunts the river. The four men discover Cray clambering out of his car on the footbridge, and – as Cray and Bishop look on in anger – The Kid forces the car off the bridge into the river.

That night, Cray and Bishop join forces at Bishop's homestead and plot revenge. As Cyril, Don, and The Kid wait outside, Wes sneaks into the homestead, determined to snatch back his gambling winnings. When The Kid finds dynamite sticks in a nearby shed, he gleefully lights and throws several of them at the homestead, alerting Bishop and Cray to the presence of the men outside. Cray pursues them, and after a fight on the footbridge, Don throws Cray into the river. Inside, Wes overhears Bishop being confronted by Claire, who has learned that Bishop was aware Pop Simon was living above the billiards hall but allowed Morrie to set fire to it regardless. Bishop discovers Wes in hiding, and forces Wes and Claire at gunpoint into a meat locker where Bishop has imprisoned a drunken Morrie to prevent him from talking about the arson.

Bishop prepares to burn down the homestead by pouring gasoline around it, but is thwarted by Cyril and The Kid, who enable Wes, Claire, and Morrie to escape. During the ensuing struggle the homestead catches fire, and Bishop grabs what he thinks is a Gladstone bag containing his money. However, The Kid has replaced the cash with dynamite sticks, which explode, killing Bishop. The burning homestead collapses into the river.

As Wes, Cyril, Claire, and Morrie watch the explosion from afar, Wes laments that the money has been lost in the fire, but is delighted to find The Kid has rescued it. However, when The Kid catches sight of the burning homestead floating down the river towards him on the footbridge, he mistakes it for the "Taniwha", and – to Wes and Cyril's horror – throws the banknotes into the river as an "offering".

In the final scene, the townsfolk attend an Anzac Day service. Don and Esmerelda smile at each other, as do the reconciled Dick and Dinah. Morrie and Claire are also in attendance. Cray arrives looking bedraggled, to the amusement of Don's father. The Kid, on horseback, salutes the service, while Wes and Cyril drive off in search of another town.

== Cast ==
- Peter Bland as Wes Pennington
- Phillip Gordon as Cyril Kidman
- Michael Lawrence as Don Jackson
- Billy T. James as The Tainuia Kid
- Marshall Napier as Sel Bishop
- Don Selwyn as Norm Cray
- Marise Wipani as Esmerelda
- Erna Larsen as Dinah
- Philip Holder as Dick
- Tricia Phillips as Claire
- Bruce Allpress as Don's Dad
- Michael Morrissey as Morrie
- Roy Billing as Darkie Benson
- Hemi Rapata as Kohi
- Bridget Armstrong as Aunt Agg
- Prince Tui Teka as Saxophonist

== Reception ==
Morrieson's novels featured some sexuality and violence, but the film downplayed these aspects of the source novel and concentrated more on the comical elements. Some critics said that the film followed the spirit of the Ealing comedies. Two authors wrote that the book makes "good-natured, nostalgic fun of small town 1940s New Zealand where Friday night's excitement is a pie and chips at the boozer" with "larger than life parodic characters". In the UK, Derek Malcolm of The Guardian called it a "lively, assured, and deeply ironic comedy". U.S. reviews were mixed: the New York Times called it a "mildly diverting comedy... that will pass the time decently enough, if not memorably", while the Los Angeles Times said "this antic excess is enough to kill off an infant [film] industry single-handedly."

== Home media ==
The film was released on DVD on 6 July 2011.

== Awards ==
=== New Zealand Film and TV Awards ===
Year	Category	Recipient
1986	Best Director	Ian Mune
1986	Best Editing	Ken Zemke
1986	Best Film	Larry Parr
1986	Best Film Score	Stephen McCurdy
1986	Best Performance, Male in a Leading Role	Peter Bland
1986	Best Performance, Male in Supporting Role	Billy T. James
1986	Best Screenplay Adaption	Ian Mune, Dean Parker
