= Tony Holden (director) =

New Zealand television producer and director

Tony Holden is a television producer and director. He has been involved in New Zealand television since the 1970s. In the 1970s, he directed episodes of the sketch show A Week of It.

Holden directed a film about the theatre group Red Mole Radio with Pictures - Red Mole (Life is a Zoo) (1980), much of which was filmed in Wellington Zoo.

In the 1980s, he produced and directed The Billy T. James Show (the 1984 season) and episodes of the Roger Hall sitcom Gliding on. He has produced soap opera Shortland Street, and served as executive producer on numerous specials.
