= Ian Cross (writer) =

New Zealand writer (1925–2019)

Ian Cross CMG
- Born: Ian Robert Cross; 6 November 1925; Masterton, New Zealand
- Died: 2 November 2019 (aged 93); Paraparaumu, New Zealand
- Occupations: Journalist; editor; public relations manager; broadcasting administrator
- Notable work: The God Boy
- Spouse: Tui Tunnicliffe (m. 1952; died 2019)
- Children: 4

Ian Robert Cross CMG (6 November 1925 – 2 November 2019) was a New Zealand novelist, journalist and administrator, and contributed significantly to New Zealand letters. His first novel, The God Boy, was released in 1957 to critical acclaim. Later novels are The Backward Sex (1959), After ANZAC Day (1961) and The Family Man (1993).

Cross was born in Masterton and educated at Wanganui Technical College. He was a newspaper reporter from 1943 to 1956, including at The Dominion (1943–1947 and chief reporter 1951–1956), the Panamá América (1947–1949) and the Southern Cross (the Labour Party newspaper, 1949–1950). He was public relations manager for Feltex New Zealand from 1961 to 1972.

His contribution to New Zealand literature extended to his work on various boards, his critical commentaries and his various roles in the New Zealand Broadcasting Corporation (NZBC). He was editor of the New Zealand Listener from 1973 to 1977, chairman of the NZBC between 1977 and 1984 and chief executive from 1984 to 1986. He was president of several organisations, including the Indecent Publications Tribunal (1964–1967), PEN (1968–1972), the QEII Arts Council (1968–1972), and the National Commission for UNESCO (1969–1972).

He held a fellowship in journalism at Harvard University in 1954–1955 and the Robert Burns Fellowship at the University of Otago in 1959. He won The Atlantic Monthly short story prize in 1956. In 1988 he published The Unlikely Bureaucrat, a non-fiction memoir. Another memoir was released in 2007 called Such Absolute Beginners.

In the 1994 New Year Honours, Cross was appointed a Companion of the Order of St Michael and St George, for services to broadcasting and literature.

Cross married Tui Tunnicliffe in 1952, and they had four sons. He died at Paraparaumu on 2 November 2019, having been predeceased by his wife a month earlier.

== Works ==
Novels

- The God Boy (1957)
- The Backward Sex (1959)
- After ANZAC Day (1961)
- The Family Man (1993)

Television

- The City of No (1971)
- The God Boy (1976), adapted by Ian Mune
