= Frank Pemberton =

English actor (1914–1971)

- Born: 14 September 1914; Stretford, Lancashire, England
- Died: 26 March 1971 (aged 56); Copthorne, Sussex, England
- Occupation: Actor
- Years active: 1939–1971
- Known for: Role of Frank Barlow in Coronation Street (1960–1964, 1967, 1971)

Frank Pemberton (14 September 1914 – 26 March 1971) was an English stage and television actor, who after appearing in numerous series and telemovies, got his big break when he became best known as an original cast member of TV series Coronation Street as patriarch Frank Barlow.

== Biography ==
Pemberton was born in Stretford, Lancashire, England on 14 September 1914. He initially studied engineering at the Birmingham Technical College and afterwards joined his father's business as a sales rep. Amateur dramatics in his then home town of Marston Green led him into the theatre and a season with the Southampton Repertory Company. At the outbreak of war, Pemberton was directed into an engineering position, in his spare time teaming up with Mervyn R Pinfield and others to stage plays for the forces. He was later posted to the Royal Navy where he managed to find time to tour most of the Scottish bases with a Naval theatre company.

Demobilisation was followed by the next step to a professional acting career with the formation in 1946 of the performance company “The Star Players”, in partnership with Ernest Pickering and Mervyn R Pinfield (as general manager). Having played a six-week season at Birkenhead YMCA the move was made to Falkirk to join the Falkirk Repertory Company in an arrangement with Aurora Productions Limited. The end of October saw Aurora Production's last performance in Falkirk and a move to The Little Theatre, Great Yarmouth, with Mervyn R Pinfield again general manager. In April 1948 both he and Mervyn R Pinfield left Aurora Productions to join the Morecambe Repertory Theatre Ltd, at the Royalty Theatre. By 1949, he was touring with the Lawrence Williamson Players, and after that joined the Charles Denville Repertory Players on Guernsey.

By April 1957, Pemberton was working on TV with the BBC and ITV. By 1960 he had made more than 100 TV performances and had made the step to Coronation Street as Frank Barlow.

Following his departure from Coronation Street in May 1964, he and other ex-members of the cast joined John Finch and Vince Powell's production of the farce “Firm Foundations” at the Royal Court, Liverpool.

== Illness and death ==
Pemberton suffered a stroke on 24 February 1965 from which he recovered but which severely compromised his acting career. He died aged 56, in Copthorne, West Sussex of a fatal stroke on 26 March 1971, approximately six weeks after his last appearance as Frank Barlow.

== Filmography (selected) ==
Title	Year	Role
Barbados Quest	1955	Parking Garage Attendant
The Adventures of Annabel (TV series)	1955	
A Yank in Ermine	1955	Member of Beveleau Household
Quiet Revolution (TV movie)	1956	Member in Crowd
The Count of Monte Carlo (TV series)	1956	The Woodcutter
The Condemned (TV movie)	1956	
Tearaway (TV movie)	1956	Prisoner
The Hands (TV movie)	1957	Barman
Nathanial Titlark (TV series)	1957	Villager/Member of the Public
The Honourable Member	1957	Tibbetts
Shadow Squad (TV series)	1957	Larry Hoyle
A Time of Day (TV series)	1957	Sgt. Williams
Hotel Imperial (TV series)	1958	
BBC Sunday Night Theatre	1956-1958	Various roles
Champion Road (TV series)	1958	Mr. Heskeith
Starr and Company (TV series)	1958	Harry Watson/Mr. Barker
The Chinese Dagger (TV series)	1958	Police Sergeant
Life with the Lyons (TV series)	1958	
The Scarf (TV miniseries)	1959	PC. Shaw
Body Found (TV movie)	1959	Landlord of Pub
This Desirable Residence (TV movie)	1959	Jim
Emergency-Ward 10 (TV series)		
In the Wake of a Stranger	1959	Landlord
Armchair Theatre (TV series)	1959	2nd creditor
Hancock's Half Hour (TV series)	1956-1959	Baron. Gregoffski
No Hiding Place (TV series)	1959	1st Customer
Suspense (TV series)	1960	Police Sergeant
ITV Television Playhouse (TV series)	1960	Various roles
Scotland Yard (TV series)	1960	Night Security Guard
Arthur's Treasured Volumes (TV series)	1960	Mr. Brown
The Herries Chronicle (TV series)	1960	First. Man in Inn
Boyd Q.C. (TV series)	1958-1960	Court Usher
On Trial (TV series)	1960	Foreman of the Jury
Tales from Dickens (TV series)	1960	2nd Creditor
BBC Sunday Night Play (TV series)	1960	Customer
Coronation Street: First Dry Run (TV movie)	1960	Frank Barlow
Theatre 625	1964	Carter

== Principal role ==
Title	Year	Role
Coronation Street	1960 -1971	Frank Barlow
