= Jon Gadsby =

New Zealand writer and comedian (1953-2015)

Jon Gadsby QSM
- Born: Jonathan Ernest Gadsby; 1 November 1953; Derbyshire, England
- Died: 12 December 2015 (aged 62); Christchurch, New Zealand
- Occupations: Comedian, actor, writer

Jonathan Ernest Gadsby QSM (1 November 1953 – 12 December 2015) was a New Zealand television comedian and writer, most well known for his role in the comedy series McPhail and Gadsby co-starring alongside David McPhail. He died of cancer aged 62.

== Life and career ==
Gadsby was born in Derbyshire, England, and went to school in Invercargill when his family moved to New Zealand. He studied law at the University of Otago, leaving in his final year to work at Radio Otago. He entered television with David McPhail in the comedy A Week of It in 1977, before the pair went on to the successful and long-running 80s political satire McPhail and Gadsby.

Gadsby appeared in numerous television programmes, several films, and wrote more than 20 books, mainly for children. He wrote for The New Zealand Herald, Metro and The Listener, and performed corporate voicing.

Gadsby married Canon Media Awards-winning subeditor Jo Knight (then Gadsby) in Auckland in 1997. The couple had a daughter, Emma Rose, born in 2001. In 2003, Gadsby co-founded the Christchurch lifestyle magazine Avenues alongside his sister, Sharon Collins, serving as its founding editor with editorial support from Knight. Though the couple later separated, they remained close co-parents, and Knight and their daughter supported Gadsby in Christchurch during his terminal illness.

In 2008, he received a conviction for drink-driving, after being stopped at a checkpoint in December 2006. In 2011, he was convicted of his fourth drink-driving charge, having been stopped with a breath alcohol reading 2.5 times in excess of the legal limit.

He died in Christchurch on 12 December 2015 from cancer.

== Honours and awards ==
McPhail and Gadsby won the "Best Television Entertainment Programme" award in 1981, and David McPhail and Gadsby were jointly voted the "Best Television Entertainer". In the 1992 New Year Honours, Gadsby was awarded the Queen's Service Medal for public services. Gadsby, David McPhail and A. K. Grant, were named best writers at the 1996 Film and Television Awards, for the series Letter to Blanchy.

== Work ==
=== Television ===
- A Week of It (1977)
- McPhail and Gadsby (1980–1987, 1997–98)
- Rabbiter's Rest (1983)
- Issues (1991)
- More Issues (1992)
- Letter to Blanchy (1996–1997)
- Xena: Warrior Princess (2000)
- Intrepid Journeys – Myanmar (Series 2, No 14; 2004)

=== Film ===
- 1980 Nutcase
- 1984 Second Time Lucky
- 1984 The Bounty
- 2008 Sisterhood

=== Writing ===
- 1984 Book of Beasts
- 1998 Dave and the Giant Pickle (Illustrator)
- 1989 The Dictionary of Wimps with Allan Grant and David McPhail
- 1995 Martin's Gang and the Ogre (Tui turbo)
- 1995 Griselda Marmalade Forsythe
- 1997 The Fantail and the Weka
- 1998 The song of Nelson Mandela : the freedom to be
- 2000 The Trough
- 2001 Toi Toi Valley: The Big Black Boulder
- 2001 Toi Toi Valley: The Scary Scaly Visitor
- 2004 Bumblebee Pie
- 2005 Zoo, The: Feeding
- 2005 Zoo, The: Babies
- 2000 Kapai books

=== Theatre ===
- 2008 Letter to Blanchy : Stir Crazy (with David McPhail)
