= David McPhail =

New Zealand actor and writer (1945–2021)

David McPhail ONZM QSM
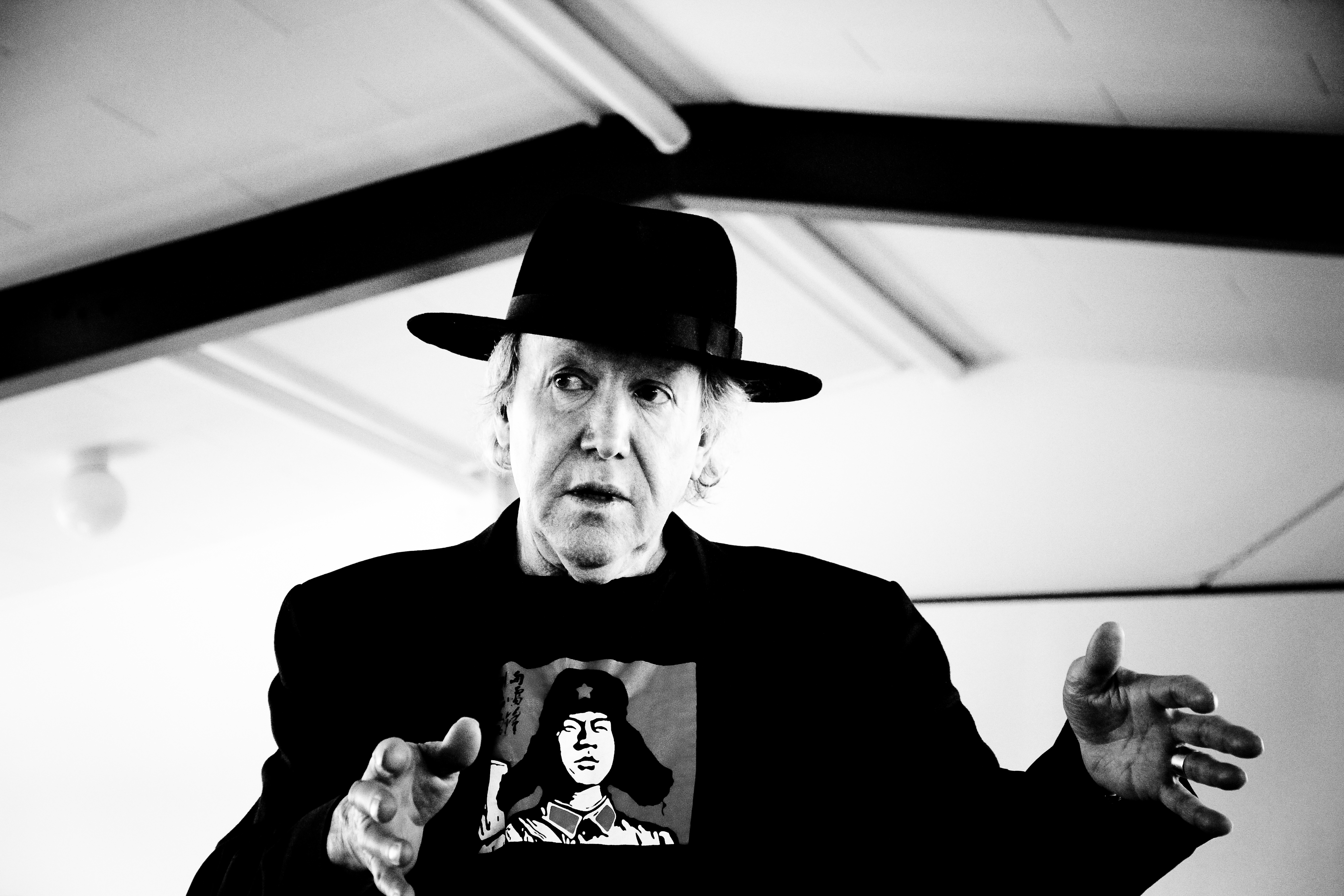
- McPhail in 2011, rehearsing a play
- Born: David Alexander McPhail; 11 April 1945; Christchurch, New Zealand
- Died: 14 May 2021 (aged 76); Christchurch, New Zealand
- Occupations: Comedian, actor
- Relatives: Neil McPhail (half-brother)

David Alexander McPhail ONZM QSM (11 April 1945 – 14 May 2021) was a New Zealand comedic actor and writer whose television career spanned four decades. McPhail first won fame on sketch comedy show A Week of It, partly thanks to his impressions of New Zealand prime minister Robert Muldoon. He went on to appear in multiple series of sketch show McPhail and Gadsby, and hit comedy Letter to Blanchy. All three shows featured his longtime friend Jon Gadsby.

== Early life and family ==
McPhail was born in Christchurch on 11 April 1945, the son of Alexander Edward McPhail and his second wife, Ivy Freda Halford. His father was described as a "devout atheist" of Scottish descent who was a businessman and chairman of New Zealand Rugby. His half-siblings included Neil McPhail and Clement McPhail, both of whom represented Canterbury at rugby. Neil McPhail was also coach of the New Zealand national rugby union team, the All Blacks, from 1961 to 1965. David McPhail was educated at Cathedral Grammar School and Christchurch Boys' High School, and went on to study at the University of Canterbury.

== Career ==
McPhail joined the New Zealand Broadcasting Corporation as a journalist in 1967 and worked on both radio and television news stories. Between 1968 and 1969, he was a reporter on the magazine show Town and Around. From 1971 to 1977, he worked as a television producer and actor and produced light entertainment shows for three years, before winning fame with A Week of It. One of the earliest New Zealand comedy shows, both to satirise politicians and win a wide audience, the series mixed sketches lampooning politics, sport, and television.

McPhail went on to create and appear in at least seven series of skit show McPhail and Gadsby, co-starring his A Week of It colleague Jon Gadsby, and backwoods comedy Letter to Blanchy, which spawned a 2008 play.

McPhail starred in the two seasons of the series Seven Periods with Mr Gormsby. McPhail plays Gormsby, a dominating, old-fashioned school teacher who ruffles feathers when he begins teaching at a low-decile school i.e. a school in a low-income area. McPhail went on to play eccentric superhero The Green Termite in The Amazing Extraordinary Friends.

McPhail's autobiography The Years Before My Death: Memories of a Comic Life was published by Longacre in 2010.

== Honours and awards ==
In the 1992 New Year Honours, McPhail was awarded the Queen's Service Medal for public services. He was presented the Reilly Comedy Award from the Variety Artists Club of New Zealand in 2003. In the 2008 New Year Honours, he was appointed an Officer of the New Zealand Order of Merit, for services to television and the theatre.

== Personal life ==
McPhail married Anne McLeod on 25 February 1967. He had two children.

McPhail died on 14 May 2021 at the Merivale Retirement Village in Christchurch. He was 76, and suffered a heart attack prior to his death.

== Credits ==
=== Television ===
- A Week of It (1977–1979)
- McPhail and Gadsby (1980–1987, 1997–1998)
- Loose Enz (episode "Coming and Going") (1982)
- Country Kiwi and the Cool City Cat (co-writer) (1989)
- Issues (1991)
- Letter to Blanchy (1996–1997)
- Seven Periods with Mr Gormsby (2005–2006)
- The Life & Times of Te Tutu (director)
- Crumpy (director)
- Then Comes Love by James Griffin (director)
- Amazing Extraordinary Friends (2007–2010)
- The White Elephant (2012)

=== Theatre ===
- Then Comes Love (director, 2005)
- Alone it Stands – Court Theatre, Christchurch (director, 2005)
- Muldoon – Downstage Theatre, Wellington, (25 June – 17 July 2004) — a play about the former New Zealand Prime Minister Robert Muldoon
