= Ian Mune =

New Zealand actor

Sir Ian Mune KNZM OBE
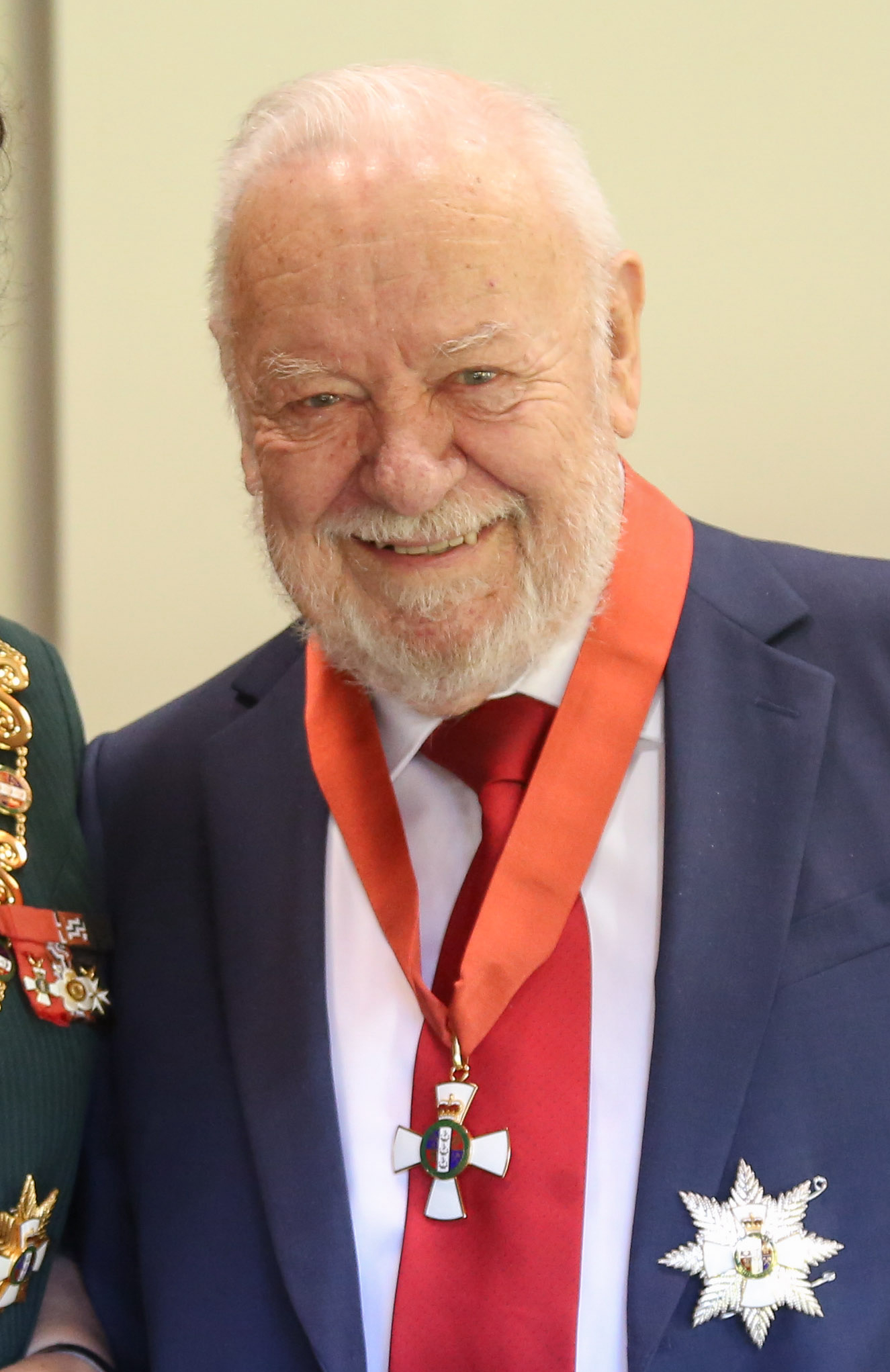
- Mune in 2024
- Born: Ian Barry Mune; 1941 (age 84–85); Auckland, New Zealand
- Occupations: Film director, actor
- Spouse: Josie Pauline Rockel (d. 2015)

Sir Ian Barry Mune (born 1941) is a New Zealand character actor, director, and screenwriter. His screen acting career spans four decades and more than 50 roles. His work as a film director includes hit comedy Came a Hot Friday, an adaptation of classic New Zealand play The End of the Golden Weather, and What Becomes of the Broken Hearted?, the sequel to Once Were Warriors.

== Early life and family ==
Mune was born in Auckland, and educated at Wesley College in the same city. He was married to the writer Josie Mune until her death in 2015.

== Acting ==
Mune acted on stage while training to be a teacher in Wellington. After time acting in the UK, he returned to his native New Zealand and won a Feltex award in 1975 after starring in one-off television drama Derek. Another award followed for playing Leo Moynihan, the secretary of a trade union in television series Moynihan. In 1987 he appeared in the TVNZ documentary mini-series Erebus: The Aftermath for which he won the award for Best Male in a Dramatic Role.

In 1994, Mune won another New Zealand television award after playing Prime Minister Sir Robert Muldoon in television mini-series Fallout, which depicted the end of the Muldoon-led National Government.

Mune featured in a documentary about the making of Shakespeare's King Lear called In The Shadow of King Lear by New Zealand company Theatre at Large giving insight into his acting process.

He has gone on to appear in a range of New Zealand feature films, including A Song of Good, Savage Honeymoon and I'm Not Harry Jenson. He played Winston Churchill in American telemovie Ike: Countdown to D-Day, and Buster Keaton in Lucy: The Lucille Ball Story.

Mune was a support role in the Australian drama Wanted, opposite Rebecca Gibney and Robyn Malcolm that premiered in 2016.

In 2024, he appeared in The Rule of Jenny Pen.

== Directing and writing ==
Mune took multiple creative roles on 1976 anthology series Winners & Losers, which saw him collaborating with director Roger Donaldson. The two first collaborated on Derek; Mune directed and wrote some episodes of the new series, and acted in others. Having helped script Donaldson's first feature film, dystopian thriller Sleeping Dogs, Mune also appeared on-screen alongside its star, Sam Neill.

Mune's other writing credits include adapting classic Ian Cross novel The God Boy into a well-regarded telemovie, the movie version of children's fable The Silent One, and co-writing Goodbye Pork Pie, the first New Zealand feature to win large audiences in its home country.

In 1985 he made his feature debut as a director with hit comedy Came a Hot Friday. Based around the escapades of two smalltown conmen in 50s era New Zealand, the film is based on the novel by Ronald Hugh Morrieson.

Mune won further acclaim in 1991 for directing 'coming of age' drama The End of the Golden Weather, an adaptation of parts of Bruce Mason's classic one-man play. Mune spent a number of years developing this passion project and seeking finance, working with Mason on the project before Mason died.

What Becomes of the Broken Hearted? won nine of its 13 New Zealand Film Award nominations in 1999. The film is the sequel to hard-edged drama Once Were Warriors, which became New Zealand's most successful feature film soon after release. It remains Mune's biggest commercial success to date.

Mune's other directorial projects include a feature-length documentary on comedian (and Came a Hot Friday actor) Billy T James, teenage drama The Whole of the Moon, and UVF thriller The Grasscutter. For television, he directed episodes of comedy series Letter to Blanchy and anthology series The Ray Bradbury Theater. He was one of a large team of second unit directors on Peter Jackson's adaptation of The Lord of the Rings and played a small cameo in the first film.

In 2008 Mune directed depression-era telefeature movie Life's A Riot. Mune also had a cameo role as a judge, after the actor cast in the role did not show up.

Mune: An Autobiography was published in 2010.

== Honours, awards and nominations ==
- 2008 – Qantas Film and Television Awards - Nominated for Best Supporting Actor - Film: for A Song of Good
- 2000 – Qantas Film and Television Awards - Rudall Hayward Award
- 1999 – Nokia New Zealand Film Awards - Best Director: for What Becomes of the Broken Hearted?
- 1998 – TV Guide Television Awards - Best Actor: for Home Movie
- 1996 – TV Guide New Zealand Film and Television Awards - Best Screenplay - Film (shared with Richard Lymposs): for The Whole of the Moon
- 1996 – TV Guide New Zealand Film and Television Awards -Best Supporting Actor - Television: for Cover Story, episode 3
- 1996 – Giffoni International Film Festival (Children's Film Festival, Italy) - First Prize (Golden Gryphon): The Whole of the Moon
- 1995 – New Zealand Film and Television Awards - Best Actor - Television: for Fallout
- 1993 – CableAce Awards (United States) - Best Directing for a Dramatic Series: for The Ray Bradbury Theatre, 'Great Wide World Over There' episode
- 1993 – Young Artist Awards (United States) - Outstanding Foreign Film: The End of the Golden Weather
- 1992 – New Zealand Film Awards - Best Film: The End of the Golden Weather
- 1992 – New Zealand Film Awards - Best Director: for The End of the Golden Weather
- 1992 – Giffoni International Film Festival - First Prize (Golden Gryphon): The End of the Golden Weather
- 1991 – Appointed an Officer of the Order of the British Empire, for services to film and theatre, in the 1991 New Year Honours
- 1988 – Listener Film and Television Awards - Best Male Performance in a Dramatic Role - Television: for Erebus: The Aftermath
- 1986 – National Mutual GOFTA Awards - Best Film: Came a Hot Friday
- 1986 – National Mutual GOFTA Awards - Best Director - Film: for Came a Hot Friday
- 1986 – National Mutual GOFTA Awards - Best Screenplay Adaptation - Film (shared with Dean Parker): for Came a Hot Friday
- 1981 – Feltex Television Awards (New Zealand) - Best Script (with John Banas): for Little Big Man Takes a Shot at the Moon
- 1979 – Feltex Television Awards - Best Drama: The Mad Dog Gang Meets Rotten Fred and Ratsguts
- 1977 – Feltex Television Awards - Best Actor: for Winners and Losers and Moynihan
- 1977 – Feltex Television Awards - Best Script: The God Boy
- 1976 – Feltex Television Awards - Best Script (shared with Peter Hansard): for The Woman at the Store
- 1976 – Feltex Television Awards - Nominated for Best Actor: The Woman at the Store
- 1975 – Feltex Television Awards - Best Drama: Derek
- 1975 – Feltex Television Awards - Best Actor: for Derek

In the 2024 New Year Honours, Mune was appointed a Knight Companion of the New Zealand Order of Merit, for services to film, television and theatre.

== See also ==
- Cinema of New Zealand
