= Rain of the Children =

- Directed by: Vincent Ward
- Written by: Vincent Ward; Alison Carter; Louis Nowra
- Release date: September 25, 2008 (New Zealand)
- Running time: 98 minutes
- Country: New Zealand
- Language: English
- Box office: $198,175

Rain of the Children is a 2008 feature film written, directed and produced by Vincent Ward. It stars Rena Owen and Temuera Morrison.

In Rain of the Children, Ward further explores the subject of his earlier film, In Spring One Plants Alone when, as a young film student he travelled to the Ureweras and documented the lives of an elderly Māori woman (Puhi) and her schizophrenic son (Niki).

== Cast ==
- Rena Owen, star of Once Were Warriors features as Puhi Tatu. Miriama Rangi, Mikaira Tawhara Harmony Wihapi and Melody Wihapi all play Puhi at different stages of her life, along with other Tuhoe actresses.
- Temuera Morrison from Star Wars: Episode II – Attack of the Clones and Once Were Warriors plays the prophet Rua Kenana, to whose community in Maungapohatu Puhi belonged as an adolescent.
- Waihoroi Shortland plays the part of Puhi's adult son Niki.
- Other featured cast include Taungaroa Emile, Mahue Tawa, Mikira Jenkem, Katarina Nohopai Tangiwai, Kimikimi Mane and Ray Pomare.
- Many Tuhoe descendants played parts, recreating scenes their ancestors had experienced.
- Key Tuhoe elders and historians are interviewed in the film.
- Vincent Ward plays himself in the film.

== Production ==
Rain of The Children was filmed on location in Tuhoe country in the Urewera ranges in New Zealand. The production returned to the places Puhi had lived and the sacred mountain, Maungapohatu, where traces of Rua's community still remain.

== Release ==
Rain of The Children's world premiere was at the Sydney Film Festival (In Competition) on 7 June 2008.

Voted by the audience from 250 feature films, Rain of the Children won the Grand Prix at Era New Horizons Film Festival—a major international film festival in Poland. The film was also nominated for best director and won best composer at the Qantas Film and TV Awards in New Zealand. Vincent Ward was also nominated for best director at the Australian Directors Guild Awards. The film was nominated for Best Documentary Feature Film at the 2008 Asia Pacific Screen Awards.
