= Mamaengaroa Kerr-Bell =

New Zealand Māori actress

- Born: 1978 (age 46–47); Whangārei, New Zealand
- Occupation: Actress
- Years active: 1994–2002

Mamaengaroa Kerr-Bell (born 1978) is a former New Zealand actress.

== Biography ==
Her breakthrough role as Grace Heke in the Lee Tamahori film, Once Were Warriors, based on the book of the same name by Alan Duff, was as a "sixteen-year-old newcomer [when Kerr-Bell] was discovered by casting director Don Selwyn while accompanying a friend to the auditions for Once Were Warriors. She had never acted before but when Selwyn asked her if she'd like to read, she accepted and instantly won over Rena Owen and Temuera Morrison, who play her character's parents.

In 2014 she recalled her 1994 role for a documentary made on the film's 20th anniversary. She now lives in Cairns, Australia and works in real estate; she has no immediate plans to return to acting.

== Filmography ==
- "Mataku" - The Sisters (2002) TV Episode .... Nola
- Staunch (2000) (TV)
- "Duggan" - Last Resort (1999) TV Episode .... Private Kate Ngarimu
- Shortland Street (1992) TV Series .... Tania Rikihana (1997)
- Once Were Warriors (1994) .... Grace Heke
