= What Becomes of the Brokenhearted (disambiguation) =

What Becomes of the Brokenhearted is a song by Jimmy Ruffin.

What Becomes of the Brokenhearted or Broken Hearted may also refer to:

- What Becomes of the Broken Hearted? (novel), a 1996 novel by Alan Duff
- What Becomes of the Broken Hearted? (film), a 1999 film based on the novel
