= Tammy Davis =

New Zealand actor

- Occupation: Actor
- Years active: 1999–present

Tammy Davis is a New Zealand actor, best known for his role as Munter on the hit New Zealand comedy-drama Outrageous Fortune. He grew up in Raetihi, New Zealand.

== Career ==
Davis has performed in both film and television, including Black Sheep, Whale Rider and in Taika Waititi's short film Tama Tu. He also starred as Mookie in What Becomes of the Broken Hearted?, the sequel to Once Were Warriors. Davis made his feature film direction debut on the 2015 film, Born to Dance, released in September 2015. In 2017 he joined George FM, where he was a host on the breakfast show alongside General Lee. He finished there in October 2025.

In 2020, Davis starred as Vice Principal Trev in The Eggplant, a New Zealand-teen-drama crime-comedy series released to TVNZ OnDemand and YouTube. In 2021, he was a contestant on Celebrity Treasure Island 2021.

== Filmography ==
=== Television ===
| Title | Year | Role | Notes |
|---|---|---|---|
| Jackson's Wharf | 1999–2002 | Worm | 4 episodes |
| Mataku | 2005 | Jason | Episode: "The Chosen Ones" |
| Outrageous Fortune | 2005–10 | Jared "Munter" Mason | Series regular |
| The Market | 2005 | Ritchie Johnson | Episode: "Season 1, Episode 2" |
| Dancing in the Sky | 2011 | William Barnard Rhodes-Moorhouse | Documentary; Lead role |
| Missing Christmas | 2012 | Tane Te Pania (voice) | Television film |
| Sunny Skies | 2013 | Deano | Main role |
| Top of the Lake | 2013, 17 | Constable Howe | 2 episodes |
| Auckland Daze | 2013–14 | Himself | 3 episodes |
| #KOMTR | 2015 | Host | |
| Only Aotearoa | 2015 | Various roles | Main role; web series |
| The Barefoot Bandits | 2016–19 | Tane TePania (voice) | Main role |
| Jimi's World | 2017 | Himself | 1 episode |
| Only Aotearoa | 2017–19 | Various roles | Main role |
| Shortland Street | 2017–18 | Luke Whakapano | |
| Funny Girls | 2018 | Various roles | Episode "Season 3, Episode 2" |
| All Star Family Feud | 2018 | Contestant | |
| Misadventures of a Pacific Professional | 2019 | Mike Wiki | 2 episodes; web series |
| Whatta Beauty | 2020 | —N/a | Director |
| The Eggplant | 2020 | Vice Principal Trevor | Main role; web series |

=== Film ===
| Title | Year | Role | Notes |
|---|---|---|---|
| What Becomes of the Broken Hearted? | 1999 | Mookie | |
| Whale Rider | 2002 | Dog | |
| Fracture | 2004 | Det. Peters | |
| Spooked | 2004 | Andy | |
| Tama Tū | 2005 | Māori Battalion Soldier | Short film |
| Black Sheep | 2006 | Tucker | |
| Eagle vs Shark | 2007 | Fight Extra | |
| Tonight on NZ on Screen | 2010 | Presenter | Short film |
| Ebony Society | 2011 | —N/a | Short film, writer and director |
| Sonny, My Older Brother | 2012 | —N/a | Short film, writer and director |
| Fantail | 2013 | Dad | |
| Damien | 2014 | Damien | Short film |
| Born to Dance | 2015 | —N/a | Director |
| Black Sheeps | 2026 | Tucker | |

== Personal life ==
Of Māori descent, he identifies with Ngāti Rangi and Atihaunui a Paparangi and is the half brother of Kiwi actor, Julian Arahanga.

He had a long-term relationship with the producer Ainsley Gardiner and they have three daughters. He is now married to Cypress Vivieaere.
