= 1999 Birthday Honours (New Zealand) =

Awards list for New Zealand

1999 Queen's Birthday Honours
- Previous: 1999 New Year Honours; Next: 1999 bravery awards
- Type: New Zealand royal honours: New Zealand Order of Merit; Queen's Service Order; Queen's Service Medal
- Date: 7 June 1999
- Country: New Zealand

Highlights
- Total recipients: 174

The 1999 Queen's Birthday Honours in New Zealand, celebrating the official birthday of Queen Elizabeth II, were appointments made by the Queen in her right as Queen of New Zealand, on the advice of the New Zealand government, to various orders and honours to reward and highlight good works by New Zealanders. They were announced on 7 June 1999.

The recipients of honours are listed here as they were styled before their new honour.

== New Zealand Order of Merit ==
=== Dame Grand Companion (GNZM) ===
- The Honourable Sian Seerpoohi Elias – of Wellington; Chief Justice of New Zealand.
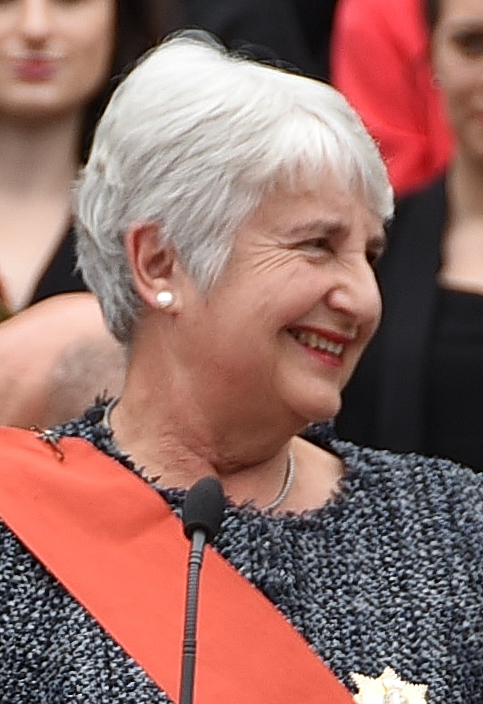
Dame Sian Elias

=== Knight Grand Companion (GNZM) ===
- The Right Honourable William Francis Birch MP – of Drury. For public services as a Member of Parliament and Minister of the Crown.
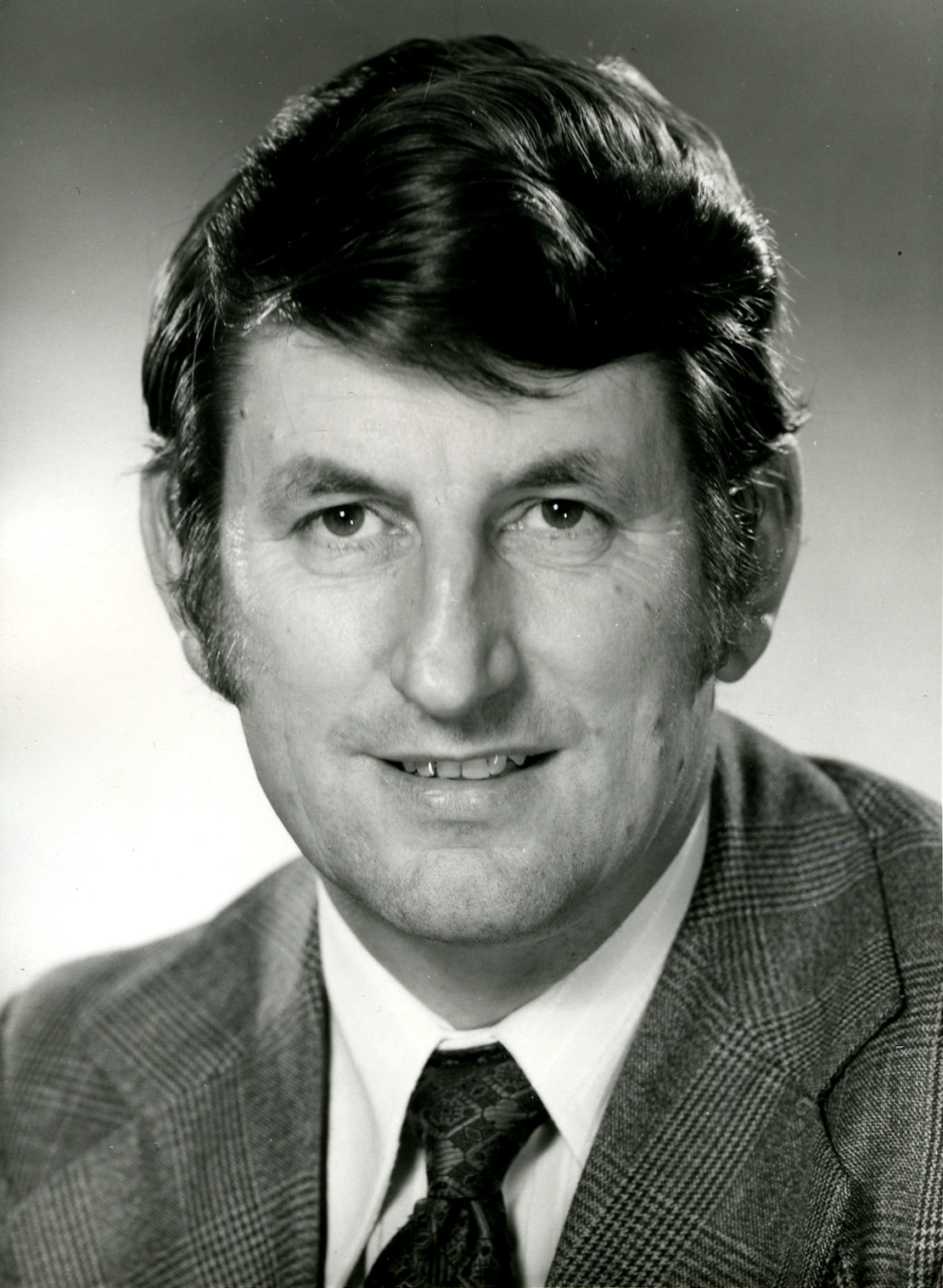
Sir William Birch

=== Dame Companion (DNZM) ===
- Margaret Clara Bazley – of Wellington. For public services, lately as chief executive of the Department of Social Welfare.
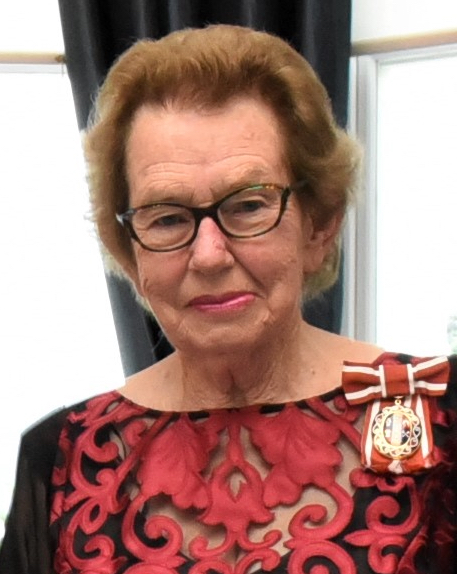
Dame Margaret Bazley

=== Knight Companion (KNZM) ===
- Brian James Lochore OBE – of Masterton. For services to sport and the community.
- Angus McMillan Tait OBE – of Christchurch. For services to technology, manufacturing and export.
- The Honourable David Lance Tompkins QC – of Auckland. For services as a judge of the High Court and to the community.
- Jon Charles Trimmer MBE – of Paekākāriki. For services to ballet.
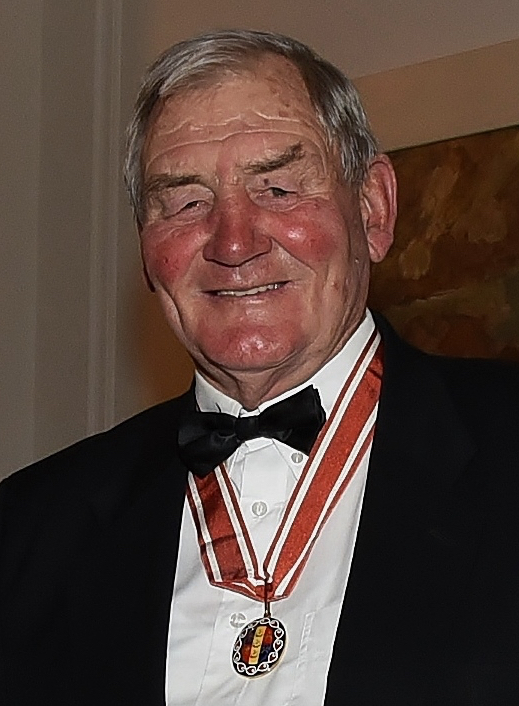
Sir Brian Lochore

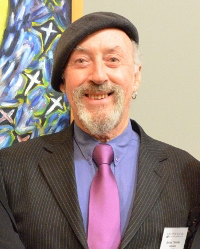
Sir Jon Trimmer

=== Companion (CNZM) ===
- The Very Reverend Michael Henry Brown ED – of Wellington. For services to the community.
- Edith Jill Clarke – of Whangārei. For services to the Girls' Brigade.
- William John Falconer – of Auckland. For services to business management and the community.
- Gerald Christopher Philip Hensley – of Martinborough. For public services, lately as Secretary of Defence.
- Neville Jordan – of Lower Hutt. For services to telecommunications and export.
- John Lambert Kerr OBE – of Christchurch. For services to the community.
- Moya Clare McTamney MBE – of Rotorua. For services to nursing.
- The Reverend Alo Leuatea Iusitini Sio QSO JP – of Auckland. For services to the Pacific Islands community.
- Patricia Jane Tauroa – of Kaeo. For services to the community.
- Maurice Alfred Till MBE – of Christchurch. For services to music.
- Dr Douglas Elliott Wright JP – of Hamilton. For services to agricultural science.
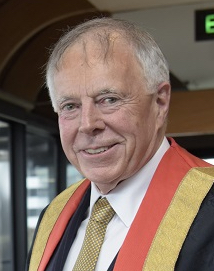
Neville Jordan

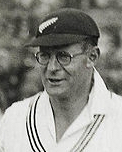
Jack Kerr

=== Officer (ONZM) ===
- John Whitefield Aitken – of Ranfurly. For services to health administration.
- David Barnes – of Tuakau. For services to the community.
- Bernadette Mary Chambers – of Wellington. For services to women and the community.
- Mathilde (Tillie) Sybille Gertrud Charlton – of Tākaka. For services to local-body and community affairs.
- Piers Anthony David Davies – of Auckland. For services to the legal profession and the community.
- Brigadier Edward Paul Dean ED ADC – Brigadiers' List, New Zealand Army Territorial Force.
- Christine Mary Fernyhough – of Auckland. For services to education and the community.
- Geoffrey Frederick Gibbs JP – of Auckland. For services to the blind.
- Professor Kuan Meng Goh JP – of Christchurch. For services to soil science and the community.
- Patricia Dawn Gordon – of Winton. For services to the community.
- Teresa Mavourneen Virginia Graham – of Whangārei. For services to ballet.
- Professor Patrick Dewes Hanan – of Cambridge, Massachusetts, United States. For services to Chinese literature and languages.
- Gillian Mary Hanly – of Auckland. For services to photography.
- John Bernard Hayes – of Wellington. For services to the Bougainville peace process.
- Associate Professor Bruce David Jamieson – of Christchurch. For services to education.
- Chaplain Pauline Law – Royal New Zealand Navy.
- Doris Lewis – of Wellington. For services to the community.
- Robert O'Brien MacLean – of Mount Maunganui. For services to ex-prisoners of war.
- Craighead William Mills – of Wanganui. For services to the community.
- John Leonard Palmer – of Nelson. For services to the kiwifruit industry.
- Jocelyn Rose Peach – of Auckland. For services to nursing.
- Marcus John Quentin Poole – of Dannevirke. For services to local-body and community affairs.
- Clive Henry Rowe – of Sheffield. For services to astronomy.
- Ngaroma Pereiha Tauhara Rupapera JP – of Awanui. For services to Māori.
- Barrie Neville Shute – of Lower Hutt. For services to surveying and the community.
- Fleur De Lyse Ross Sullivan – of Clyde. For services to tourism.
- Hugh Douglas Turnbull – of Wellington. For services to the compiling of legislation.
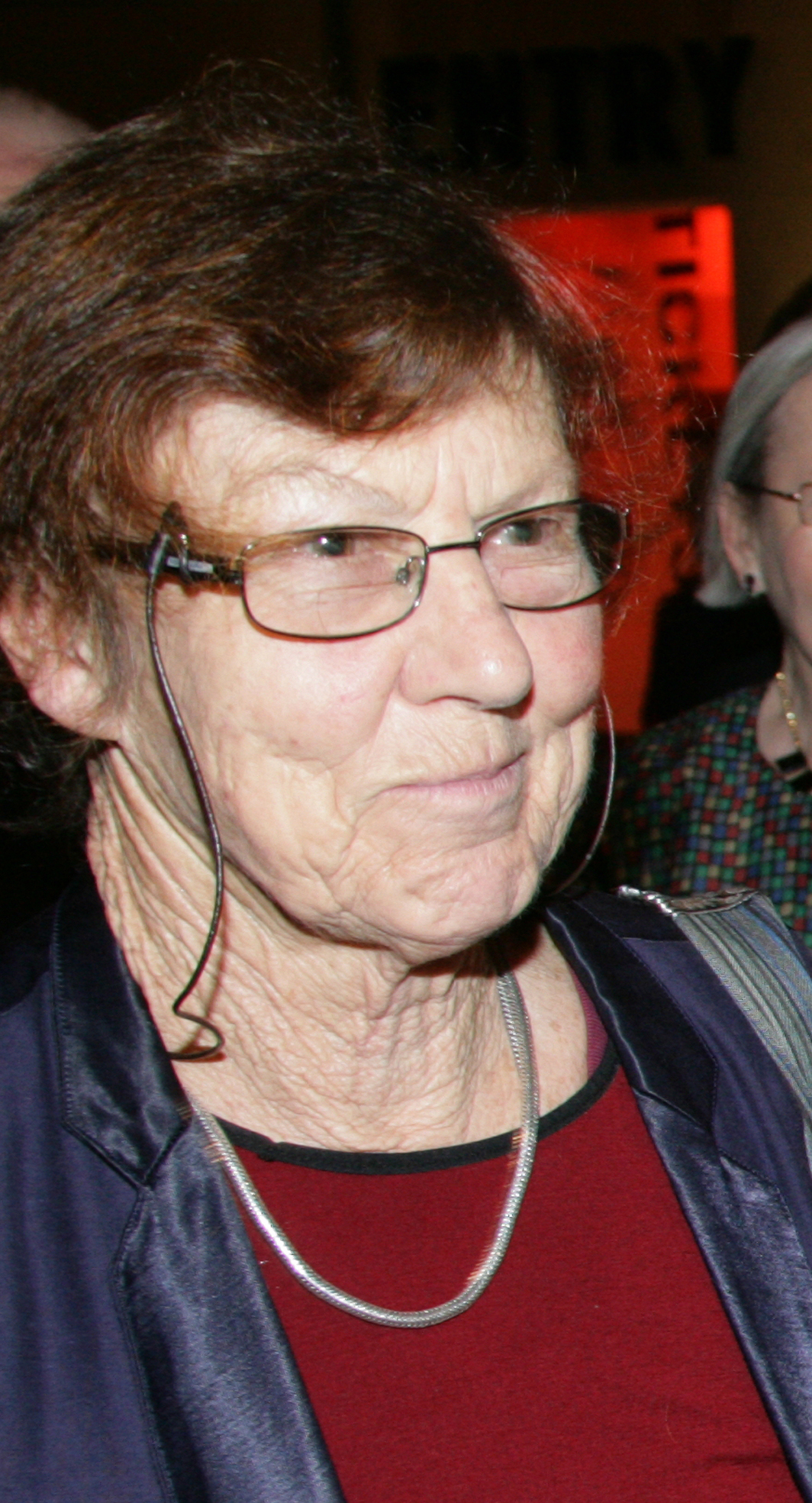
Gil Hanly

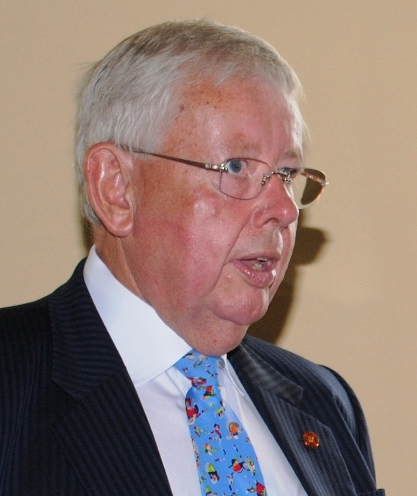
John Hayes

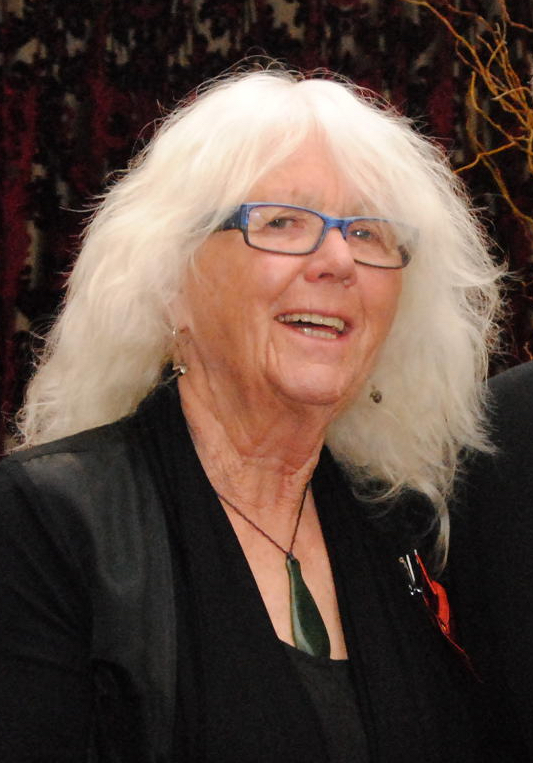
Fleur Sullivan

=== Member (MNZM) ===
- Pita Heremia Anaru ED JP – of Rotorua. For services to education and the community.
- Kenneth Ihakara Arthur JP – of Porirua. For services to the community.
- Peter Douglas Barton – of Christchurch. For services to music.
- Graeme Douglas Booth – of Auckland; chief fire officer, Titirangi Volunteer Fire Brigade. For services to the New Zealand Fire Service.
- Peter Bromhead – of Auckland. For services as a cartoonist.
- Margaret Anne Bryson – of Hastings. For services to nursing.
- Mervyn Hart Campbell – of Hamilton. For services to diving.
- Edwin James Nairn Carr – of Waiheke Island. For services to music.
- Brecon Carter – of Auckland. For services to music.
- Colin Temple Clere – of Blenheim. For services to the Duke of Edinburgh's Award.
- Joseph Henry Cotterell JP – of Nelson. For services to the community.
- Squadron Leader Tony Davies – Royal New Zealand Air Force.
- Hinetu Noeline Dell – of Invercargill. For services to Māori culture.
- Dr Peter Robert David Dryburgh – of Kaitaia. For services to medicine.
- Murray James Dudfield – of Wellington. For services to the rural fire service.
- Douglas Ensor JP – of Rangiora. For services to local government and the community.
- Edward Byron (John) Evans JP – of Warkworth. For services to the community.
- David Alexander Fagan – of Te Kūiti. For services to shearing.
- Charles Bernard Fenwick – of Auckland. For services to the community.
- Gilbert Bruce Forbes JP – of Masterton. For services to the pony club movement.
- Alice Janet Fraser – of Wellington. For services to the theatre and the community.
- Lieutenant Colonel John Ralph Gardner – Royal New Zealand Army Medical Corps (Retired).
- Tom Smith James Green – of Lower Hutt. For services to the arbitration system.
- Ronald David Greenwood – of Wellington. For services to business and the community.
- Wing Commander Peter Lawrence Guy – Royal New Zealand Air Force.
- Paul Richard Harris – of Hāwera. For services to scouting and the community.
- Gladys Lillian Heperi – of Kaitangata. For services to children.
- Ian Rutene Irwin JP – of Gisborne. For services to the community.
- Mary Vera Johns – of Levin. For services to the community.
- Gwendoline Ethel Kerr – of Christchurch. For services to nutrition and the community.
- John Bede Lagan – of Christchurch. For services to the community.
- Shirley Dawn Lalich – of Morrinsville. For services to the community.
- Hudson Percy Malcolm – of Nelson. For services to education and the community.
- Eric George Mallard – of Auckland. For services to motor sport.
- Lieutenant Commander Paul David Mayer – Royal New Zealand Navy.
- Lorna Ruby Joan Meikle – of Oamaru. For services to the community.
- Marion Grace Miller JP – of Invercargill. For services to local government.
- Squadron Leader Dennis Joseph Paul O'Connor – Royal New Zealand Air Force.
- Marylyn Bernardine Pool JP – of Wellington. For services to the community.
- Gordon Edmond Ramage – of Alexandra. For services to the community.
- Commander Scott Mitchell Rennie – Royal New Zealand Navy.
- Elizabeth Smith-Sellars Richards JP – of Auckland. For services to the community.
- Richard Daniel Riddiford – of Martinborough. For services to the beer and wine industries.
- Trevor Joseph Rigby – of Wellington. For services to sport and the community.
- Alison Hope Rudd – of Christchurch. For services to the community.
- Stephen John Rutherford – of Auckland; detective inspector, New Zealand Police.
- Lesley Helen Shand – of Culverden. For services to conservation.
- Dr John Hamlyn Stewart – of Auckland. For services to education.
- John Robert Wilkie – of Timaru. For services to drama and the community.
- Herbert Roy Williams – of Greymouth. For services to athletics and the community.

Additional

- Warrant Officer Communications Analyst Gregory Bernard Davis – Royal New Zealand Navy.
- Lieutenant Hayley Jane May – Royal Regiment of New Zealand Artillery.
- Staff Sergeant Wayne David McAsey – Royal Regiment of New Zealand Artillery.
- Lieutenant Commander Anthony Martin Millar – Royal New Zealand Navy.
- Acting Major Nigel John Orr – Corps of Royal New Zealand Engineers.

Honorary

- Violani Wills – of Wellington. For services to nursing and the Pacific Islands community.
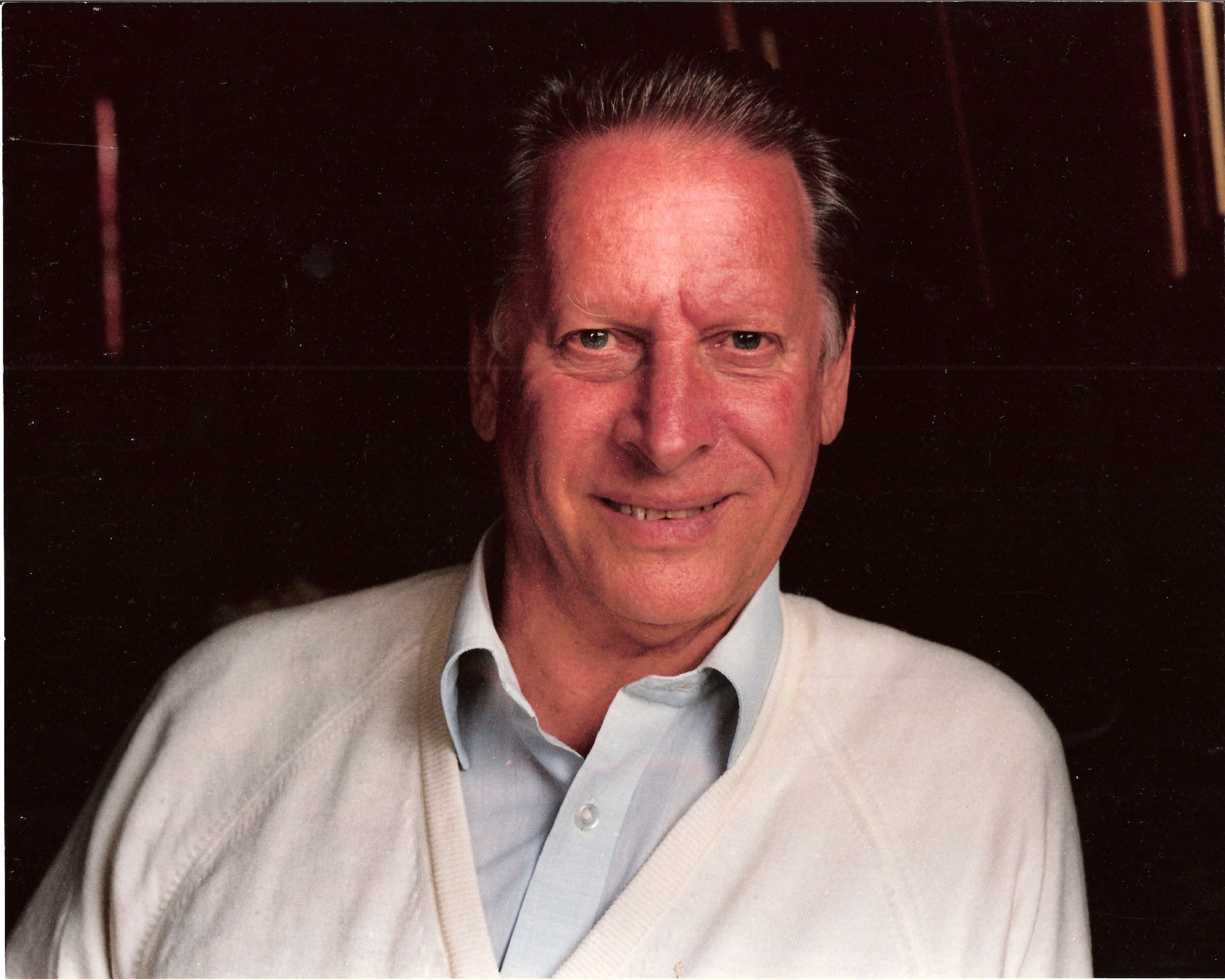
Edwin Carr

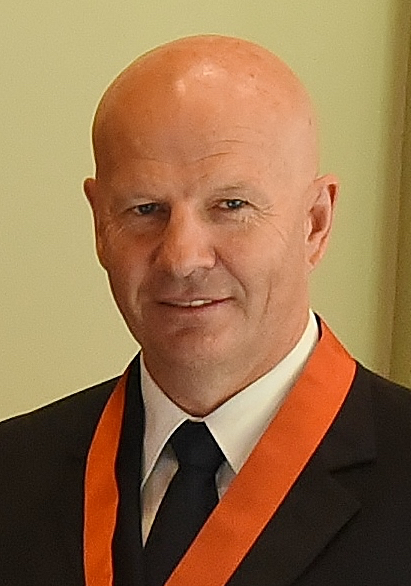
David Fagan

== Companion of the Queen's Service Order (QSO) ==
=== For community service ===
- Arthur James Bartlett – of Wellington.
- Tari Riripeti (Betty) Campbell – of Auckland.
- Miriam Assid Corban – of Waitakere (West Auckland).
- Thelma Aileen Hook – of Hāwera.
- Betty (Betsy) Mabel Sales – of Auckland.
- Elizabeth Soper – of North Shore City.
- Kevin Stuart Wall – of Invercargill.

=== For public services ===
- Gabriel Anthony Farry JP – of Gore.
- Harry Chote Lidington JP – of Taupō.
- James Rolland O'Regan JP – of Reefton.
- Dr Patrick Shannon – of Hamilton.
- Beverley Marie Traue – of Waimate.
- Joseph Maurice White – of Christchurch.
- Terence Mearns Williams – of Te Aroha.

== Queen's Service Medal (QSM) ==
=== For community service ===
- Harry Kenneth Abel – of Lower Hutt.
- Mary Jane Beer – of Auckland.
- Eileen Bridget Bradley – of Ashburton.
- Katherine Randall Burgess – of Owaka.
- Glynis Maureen Mary Collins – of Whangārei.
- Barbara Anne Comiskey – of Whakatāne.
- Desiree June Craig – of Wellington.
- Norma Catherine Crombie – of Warrington.
- Raymond Arthur Crombie – of Warrington.
- Olive Georgina Dunn – of Invercargill.
- Edith Mary Esler – of Timaru.
- Ronda Franks – of Auckland.
- Caplen George Hall JP – of Auckland.
- Thomas Fairclough Haworth – of Ōhaupō.
- Judith Anne Hull – of Waiuku.
- Mary Rehutai Kerehi JP – of Masteron.
- Hugh Lawson – of Invercargill.
- Katherine Deidre McIntyre – of Auckland.
- Janet Margaret McMechan – of Hamilton.
- Rex John McMechan – of Hamilton.
- Hugh Philip Meyer – of Wellington.
- Janet Constance Mildenhall – of Christchurch.
- Mary Montgomery – of Cheviot.
- Lionel Kingsford Otto – of Auckland.
- Margaret Roxburgh Parker – of Auckland.
- June Ethel Glady Rawiri – of Kaikohe.
- James David Freeborn Reid JP – of Christchurch.
- Trevor Henry Rose – of Bulls.
- Joan Mary Sisson – of Auckland.
- Rangiwhakaehu Walker – of Tauranga.
- Doreen Withington – of Christchurch.

=== For public services ===
- Lorna Muriel Taare Abraham – of Te Aroha.
- John David Burke JP – of Christchurch.
- Murray Arthur Burnette – of Wanganui.
- Peter Clark – of Mount Maunganui.
- Alan Everard Cotter – of Te Puke.
- Honor Veronica Doyle – of Kawerau.
- Barbara Durbin JP – of Auckland.
- Gordon MacDonel Fergusson – of Matakohe.
- Trevor Thomas Reynolds Gilbert – of Auckland.
- Maria Henrietta Godinet-Watts – of Christchurch.
- Te Pakiorangi Ruri Inia – of Rotorua.
- Joy Cynthia Keightley – of Dargaville.
- Thomas William Lewis – of Auckland.
- Lloyd Ashley McIntosh – of Auckland; sergeant, New Zealand Police.
- Dr Upali Manukulasuriya – of Taumarunui.
- Frank Mugford JP – of Leeston.
- Marie Maurcle Oldridge – of Whangārei.
- Patricia Noema (Tihi) Puanaki – of Christchurch.
- Murray Kingsley Radford – of Rotorua; senior constable, New Zealand Police.
- Brian William Smith JP – of Wanganui.
- Kenneth George Stevenson – of Papatoetoe.
- Maxwell Gerald Taylor – of Timaru.
- Patrick Thomas Timings – of Tākaka.
- Van-Su Vu JP – of Auckland.
- Derek Gordon Webb – of Tūrangi; detective sergeant, New Zealand Police.
- Robert Lindsay Webb – of Whangārei.
- Raymond Selby Williams – of Kaikōura.
- James Edward Wills – of Tauranga.
