= Larry Parr (director) =

Film and TV producer, writer and director from New Zealand

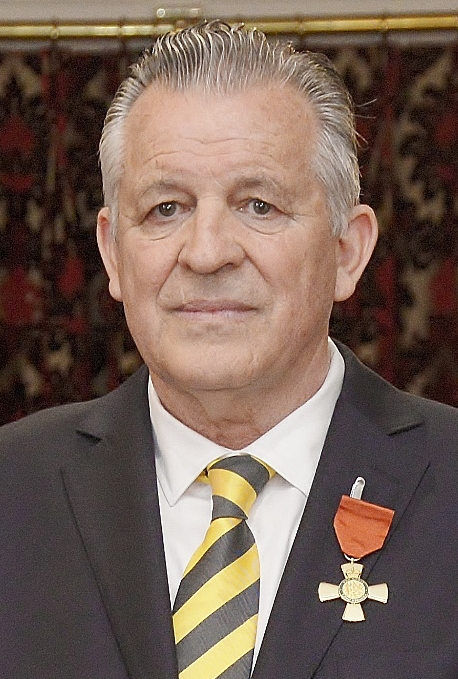
Parr in 2018

Larry George Parr ONZM, a New Zealand film and television producer, writer, and director, has been involved in the New Zealand film industry since the 1970s.

== Career ==
Parr was an associate producer on Sleeping Dogs (1977; Roger Donaldson, director), which provided Sam Neill his first major role in a feature film. New Zealand actors Ian Mune and Don Selwyn were also featured; Donna Akersten, Dorothy McKegg, and Davina Whitehouse also had roles. American actor Warren Oates had a small but memorable role, as well. The Director of Photography was Michael Seresin; Alun Bollinger was the gaffer. Stewart Main and Annie Collins were assistant editors; Geoff Murphy was the "Special FX Director." Dorthe Scheffmann and Pat Murphy were production assistants. While a few of these names would have been familiar within New Zealand theatre at the time, this film was a first opportunity to work on a feature-length narrative film for most of the people involved. Funding for the film came in part from The Queen Elizabeth II Arts Council, as well as Broadbank Corporation, where Don Brash was General Manager. Contributions from these two organisations was also unusual, since feature filmmaking was not part of the QEII Arts Council brief, and the New Zealand Film Commission had yet to be established; however, tax breaks for private investment in film production were beginning to be appealing to New Zealand businesses and corporate entities.

Since then Parr has worked on many movies, including producing Came a Hot Friday, and writing and directing Fracture (2004).

He is married to Lynne Parr, and they are the parents of Once Were Warriors actor Julian Arahanga; Nathan Parr, who appeared in Fracture; and Quentin Parr, who was involved in the production of The Hobbit trilogy.

In the 2018 Queen's Birthday Honours, Parr was appointed an Officer of the New Zealand Order of Merit, for services to film and television.

He is currently the Chief Executive/Kaihautū of Te Māngai Pāho, where Lynn Parr is Senior Content Advisor/Kaitohutohu Matua-Hōtaka for television.
