= Tim Tipene =

New Zealand author

- Born: Timothy Aldon Mead; 12 June 1972 (age 54); New Zealand
- Occupations: Author, motivational speaker, martial artist
- Notable work: Warrior Kids, Kura Toa, Pipi and Pou
- Children: Taiyang Tipene, Tahlia Tipene
- Website: timtipene.com

Tim Tipene (born 12 June 1972) is a New Zealand author, motivational speaker, martial arts instructor, trained counsellor, and founder of the youth‑development programme Warrior Kids. He has published over 25 books for children and young adults, and is acknowledged for transforming his traumatic upbringing into tools for empowering thousands of others on a personal level.

In 2026, Tipene received the Margaret Mahy Award for his contribution to children's literature. His books have been the recipients of numerous awards, including the White Ravens International Youth Library Catalogue for "Taming The Taniwha" as one of the world's top 250 children books for 2002., as well as a number of Storylines Notable Book Awards for "Pipi and Pou and the Firewoman" (2024),"Pipi and Pou and the Tentacles of the Deep" (2023), "Māui – Sun Catcher" (2017), and "The Wooden Fish" (2000). Tipene has also won honours regarding his contributions to the martial arts scene in New Zealand and for his work in wider communities through the Warrior Kids Programme, including being inducted into the New Zealand Martial Arts Hall of Fame in 2013 and being awarded a Kiwibank Local Hero Award in 2015 and 2016

== Early life ==
Tipene was born on 12 June 1972 in Henderson, Auckland to birth parents Annette Sherman and convicted sex offender Peter Mead. He was adopted as an infant into the Waitai‑Tipene family under adoptive father Willie Tipene with his birth mother Annette (Sherman) Tipene. Raised in a bicultural environment, with his European appearance contrasting with his Māori name, Tipene often experienced identity questions and exclusion from either cultural side. He affiliates with Ngāti Kurī, Te Uri‑o‑Hau, and Ngāti Whātua iwi

At the age of 12, Tipene started learning martial arts through Go Shintai Kai Karate And Judo under founder Peter Lee in Dairy Flat, Auckland. The classes incorporated Shotokan Karate and Judo, to which Tipene enjoyed and credits with helping him learn self control. Tipene continued training, eventually discovering other martial arts such as Togakure Ryu Ninjutsu, Kung Fu, and Aikido. Tipene went on to earn multiple ranks and teaching titles in various martial arts including but not limited to a 5th Dan and a Shidoshi license (instructor's certificate) in Bujinkan Budo Taijutsu, awarded in Japan, 2009 by Dr Masaaki Hatsumi, and a 5th Dan in Ai Shin Do Bujutsu (mixed martial arts) awarded in New Zealand, 2007.

In 2013, Tipene was inducted into the New Zealand Martial Arts Hall of Fame, recognised for his peaceful contribution to the martial arts scene in New Zealand

== Career ==
Tipene began working at Mount Tabor Trust in Kaukapakapa, Auckland as a residential support person in 1992 until 1994, to which he founded Kura Toa Trust, also known as the Families for Nonviolence Trust.

=== Warrior Kids ===
In the same year, Tipene went on to create Warrior Kids, a life skills programme that delivers foundational therapeutic skills in self control, anger management, and emotional awareness through martial arts, catered towards all ages. Tipene continued to run Warrior Kids in schools and communities nationwide for almost three decades until 2022, assisting and mentoring the lives of thousands of children and adults and their families, while only ever receiving funding for a period of 6 months.

=== Writing career ===
Tipene's first book "The Wooden Fish" was published in 1996. Since then, he has authored over 25 books, including picture books, junior novels, memoirs, and manuals.

== Counselling, speaking, and honours ==
As a speaker, Tipene has delivered talks through Storylines, Duffy Books in Homes, the NZ Book Council, Getting Kids into Books, Writers in Schools, and the Auckland Writers Festival. He also served as part of the Sir Peter Blake Dream Team of Leaders.

Tipene is a trained counsellor with a graduate certificate in Child and Adolescent Mental Health.

== Publications ==
Year Published	Title	Illustrator	ISBN	Ref
1999	The Wooden Fish	Jennifer Cooper	1869488261	
2001	Taming the Taniwha	Henry Campbell	1-877266-52-3	
2002	The Warrior Kids Programme Manual	Manual	095823731X	
2002	The Warrior Kids Handout Manual	Manual	0-9582373-2-8	
2004	Kura toa: Warrior School	Novel	978-1-877514-02-9	
2005	Haere, Farewell, Jack, Farewel	Huhana Smith	1-86969-104-0	
2006	Warrior Kids	Novel	978-1-86948-425-5	
2008	Hinemoa Te Toa	John Bennett	978-1-86943-818-0	
2008	Rewa Finds His Wings	Jo Thapa	978-1-86978-042-5	
2011	Warrior Kids, Warrior Training For Children	Manual	978-1-877514-22-7	
2012	Patu	Novel	978-1-877514-50-0	
2012	Bullies And Warriors	Novel	978-0-947506-30-8	
2016	Maui – Sun Catcher	Zak Waipara	978-0-947506-14-8	
2019	Mrs Battleship	Novel	978-0-9951067-9-6	
2020	Rona Moon	Theresa Reihana	978-0-947506-73-5	
2020	White Moko	Novel	978-0-9951067-8-9	
2022	Pipi and Pou and the Raging Mountain	Isobel Te Aho-White	9781990035227	
2022	Pipi and Pou and the River Monster	Isobel Te Aho-White	9781990035234	
2023	Pipi and Pou and the Tentacles of the Deep	Isobel Te Aho-White	9781990035289	
2023	Pipi and Pou and the 100 legs of terror	Isobel Te Aho-White	9781990035296	
2023	The Book that Wouldn't Read	Nicoletta Benella	978-1-99-004231-7	
2024	Pipi and Pou and the waves of destruction	Isobel Te Aho-White	9781990035364	
2024	Pipi and Pou and the Firewoman	Isobel Te Aho-White	9781990035371	
2024	The Ever-standing tree	Ani Huia Ligaliga	978-1-99-004260-7	
2025	How Many Times?	Nicoletta Benella	9781990042812	
2025	Pipi and Pou and the Shadow Below	Isobel Te Aho-White	9781990035470	
2025	Pipi and Pou and the Haunted Forest	Isobel Te Aho-White	9781990035487	

=== Other Publications ===
Year	Title	Illustrator	ISBN	Featured In	Ref
2007	I Dream Morning	Bruce Potter	9781869780159	Out of the Deep and other stories from New Zealand and the Pacific, Reed Publishing Ltd.	
2019	Ngāti Kurī Proud	Munro Te Whata	9781776698356	School Journal Level 2 November 2019, New Zealand Ministry of Education.	
2024	Pipi and Pou and the Forgotten Stream	Isobel Te Aho-White	–	A free interactive walking adventure featured on the PickPath App for the 2024 Auckland Writers Festival.	

== Awards and nominations ==
Year	Title	Award	Category	Result	Ref
2000	The Wooden Fish	Storylines Notable Book Awards	Picture Book	Won	
2002	Taming the Taniwha	The White Ravens		Selected	
2002	Taming the Taniwha	The LIANZA Children and Young Adult Book Awards	Esther Glen Junior Fiction Award	Nominated	
2006	Haere, Farewell, Jack, farewell	New Zealand Book Awards for Children and Young Adults	Picture Book Honour Award	Won	
2009	Hinemoa te toa	The LIANZA Children and Young Adult Book Awards	Te Kura Pounamu	Nominated	
2009	Hinemoa te toa	The LIANZA Children and Young Adult Book Awards	Te Tohu Taurapa mō te wahanga Pukapuka Pikitia	Won	
2009	Hinemoa te toa	The LIANZA Children and Young Adult Book Awards	Te Tohu Pounamu mo te wahanga Kaiwhakamaori	Won	
2010	Taming the Taniwha	New Zealand Picture Book Collection		Selected	
2010	Haere, Farewell, Jack, farewell	New Zealand Picture Book Collection		Selected	
2017	Māui – Sun Catcher	Storylines Notable Book Awards	Picture Book	Won	
2021	Rona Moon	Storylines Notable Book Awards	Te Reo Māori	Won	
2023	Pipi and Pou and the Raging Mountain	NZ Book Awards for Children and Young Adults, Wright Family Foundation	Esther Glen Junior Fiction Award	Finalist	
2023	Pipi and Pou and the Tentacles of the Deep	Storylines Notable Book Awards	Junior Fiction	Won	
2024	The Book that Wouldn't Read	NZ Book Awards for Children and Young Adults, Wright Family Foundation	Te Kura Pounamu Award for te reo Māori	Finalist	
2024	Pipi and Pou and the Firewoman	Storylines Notable Book Awards	Junior Fiction	Won	
2025	Pipi and Pou and the Shadow Below	Storylines Notable Book Awards	Junior Fiction	Won	
2025	Pipi and Pou and the Haunted Forest	Storylines Notable Book Awards	Junior Fiction	Won	

=== Other Awards, Honours, and Certificates ===
Year	Award	Result	Ref
2013	New Zealand Martial Arts Hall of Fame	Inducted	
2015	Kiwibank Local Hero	Medalist	
