= Dear Claudia =

- Directed by: Chris Cudlipp
- Written by: Chris Cudlipp
- Produced by: Jim McElroy
- Starring: Bryan Brown; Aleksandra Vujcic; Deborah Mailman; Rel Hunt
- Distributed by: United International Pictures
- Release date: 25 February 1999
- Running time: 95 minutes
- Country: Australia
- Language: English
- Budget: A$3.53 million
- Box office: A$265,464 (Australia)

Dear Claudia is a 1999 Australian romantic comedy.

== Premise ==
A postman, Walter, and a woman, Claudia, are stranged on a tropical island after the postman's plane crashes in the ocean.

== Cast ==
- Bryan Brown as Walter Burton
- Aleksandra Vujcic as Claudia
- Deborah Mailman
- Kim Hillas
- Rel Hunt
- Ken Radley
- Sam Healy as Sara

== Production ==
It was shot on location on Brampton Island also in a small queensland country town called Clifton. Some locals have parts as extras in the film.
