= Once Were Warriors =

1990 book by Alan Duff

- First edition cover
- Author: Alan Duff
- Language: English
- Publisher: Tandem Press
- Publication date: 1990
- Publication place: New Zealand
- Followed by: What Becomes of the Broken Hearted?

Once Were Warriors is New Zealand author Alan Duff's bestselling first novel, published in 1990. It tells the story of an urban Māori family, the Hekes, and portrays the reality of domestic violence in New Zealand. The novel was followed by two sequels, What Becomes of the Broken Hearted? (1996) and Jake's Long Shadow (2002).

It was the basis of a 1994 film of the same title, directed by Lee Tamahori and starring Rena Owen and Temuera Morrison, which made its U.S. premiere at the Hawaii International Film Festival.

== Plot summary ==
Beth Heke left her small town and, despite her parents' disapproval, married Jake "the Muss" Heke. After eighteen years, they live in a slum and have six children. Their interpretations of life and being Māori are tested. Beth is from a more traditional background and in saying so, relates to the old ways; Jake is an interpretation of what some Māori have become. Beth sometimes tries to reform herself and her family—for example, by giving up drinking and saving the money that she would have spent on alcohol. However, she finds it easy to lapse back into a pattern of drinking and irresponsibility. The family is also shown to be disconnected from Western culture and ways of learning. Beth reflects that neither she nor anyone else she knows has any books at home, and her daughter, Grace, is the only character with a real interest in school and learning. (This disconnection from books and education is a major concern of Duff's, for which reason he founded the charity Duffy Books in Homes, which gives free books to children from poor backgrounds and generally encourages reading.)

Jake is unemployed and spends most of the day getting drunk at the local pub with his friends. There he is in his element, buying drinks, singing songs and savagely beating any other patron whom he considers to have stepped out of line (hence his nickname 'The Muss'). He often invites huge crowds of friends back to his home for wild parties. While Jake portrays himself as an easygoing man out for a good time, he has a vicious temper when drinking. This is highlighted when his wife dares to 'get lippy' at one of his parties and he savagely attacks her in front of their friends.

Nig, the Hekes' eldest son, moves out to join a street gang. He cares about his siblings but despises his father for his thoughtless brutality, a feeling returned by the elder Heke. Nig attempts to find a substitute family in the form of the gang, but this is unsuccessful as the gang members are either too brutal or, in the case of Nig's gang girlfriend, too beaten down to provide him with the love and support he craves.

The second son, Mark 'Boogie' Heke, has a history of minor criminal offenses and is taken from his family and placed in a borstal. Despite his initial anger, Mark finds a new niche for himself, as the borstal manager instructs him in his Māori heritage.

Grace, the Hekes' thirteen-year-old daughter, loves writing stories as an escape from the brutality of her life. Grace's best friend is a drug-addicted boy named Toot who has been cast out by his parents and lives in a wrecked car. He is the one who really cares for her. She is the maternal figure within the family when her family is a drunken mess, clearing up the house and going with Boogie to court to attempt to make a good impression of their broken family.

Grace is raped in her bed one night, and she subsequently hangs herself. Jake, a suspect, leaves his family and starts living in a park, where he reflects on his life and befriends a homeless young man. Meanwhile, Beth starts a Māori culture group and generally attempts to revive the community.

=== Autobiographical elements ===
Once Were Warriors, and Duff's fiction in general is strongly influenced by his childhood experiences. In his 1999 autobiography, Out of the Mist and Steam, he describes his Māori mother (and most of her relatives) as alcoholic, irresponsible and physically and emotionally abusive. His Pākehā father and his relatives, by contrast, were highly educated and sophisticated—one uncle, Roger Duff, was a well-known anthropologist; his paternal grandfather was liberal magazine editor and literary patron Oliver Duff.

As a teenager, Duff himself spent some time in borstal, and he drew on this when writing about Boogie. The book's setting of Two Lakes is based on his hometown of Rotorua (a Māori-language name meaning "two lakes"; roto lake, rua two), and on the Ford Block of state housing in the town.
