= Fracture (2004 film) =

2004 New Zealand film directed by Larry Parr

- Fracture film poster
- Directed by: Larry Parr
- Written by: Larry Parr
- Based on: Crime Story by Maurice Gee
- Produced by: Charlie McClellan
- Starring: Kate Elliott; Jared Turner; John Noble
- Edited by: Jonathan Woodford-Robinson
- Distributed by: New Zealand Film Commission
- Release date: September 2004
- Running time: 107 minutes
- Country: New Zealand
- Language: English
- Budget: $1 million

Fracture is a 2004 New Zealand film written and directed by Larry Parr and based on the novel by Maurice Gee. The film is set in Wellington and stars Kate Elliott, Jared Turner and John Noble. The film was met with positive reviews and was the second highest grossing local film at the New Zealand box office in 2004 behind In My Father's Den.

== Plot ==
A young solo mother (Elliott) loves her son and his needs are foremost, but she still has room in her heart for her very broken brother (Turner), even as her fundamentalist mother cruelly rejects her. But when the brother is responsible for a woman's broken neck, during his burglary of her house, families are changed as crisis amplifies and at times the young mother seems to be the only adult.

== Cast ==
Actor	Role
Kate Elliott	Leanne Rosser
Jared Turner	Brent Rosser
John Noble	Howard Peet
Tim Lee	Clyde Rosser
Miranda Harcourt	Irene Rosser
Alicia Fulford-Wierzbicki	Olivia Peet
Tammy Davis	Detective Peters
Jed Brophy	Tony Dorio
Dane McMahon	Sione Ta'ala
Jennifer Ward-Lealand	Ulla Peet
Cliff Curtis	Detective Franklin
Julian Arahanga	Detective Harawira

== Tagline ==
A single crack can shatter everything.

== Production ==
The film had originally been set for a 2003 release but was delayed during production by the dissolution of director Larry Parr's production company Kahukura Productions.
