= What Becomes of the Broken Hearted? (film) =

1999 New Zealand drama film

- Film poster
- Directed by: Ian Mune
- Written by: Alan Duff
- Produced by: Bill Gavin
- Starring: Temuera Morrison; Clint Eruera; Nancy Brunning; Julian Arahanga; Rena Owen
- Cinematography: Allen Guilford
- Edited by: Michael J. Horton
- Music by: David Hirschfelder
- Production companies: South Pacific Pictures; Sequel
- Distributed by: PolyGram Filmed Entertainment
- Release date: 27 May 1999
- Running time: 98 minutes (PAL Format)
- Country: New Zealand
- Language: English

What Becomes of the Broken Hearted? is a 1999 New Zealand drama film directed by Ian Mune and starring Temuera Morrison based on Alan Duff's novel What Becomes of the Broken Hearted? (1996), the sequel to Once Were Warriors (1990), which was made into the film Once Were Warriors (1994).

== Plot ==
Nig Heke, a member of the Black Hawks gang, is killed during a raid against the Black Snakes, a rival gang. Nig's father, Jake "the Muss", reluctantly attends his tangi, but is ostracised by his family for his past domestic violence. Nig's younger brother, Sonny, vows revenge against the Black Hawk leader Grunt, upon finding out that he had set Nig up in order to punish Jake for having previously humiliated him. Together with Nig's former girlfriend Tania, he robs a bank and uses the money to pay the Black Snakes' leader Apeman to strike at the Black Hawks.

Meanwhile, Jake's constant brawling gets him barred from his favourite pub and his girlfriend leaves him. He befriends a pair of construction workers who help him find meaningful employment, take him boar hunting, and teach him how to maintain friendships without needing to constantly assert dominance through force.

Apeman refuses to keep his end of the bargain and sexually abuses Tania. She and Sonny take matters into their own hands and kill Grunt, thus triggering a gang war. Tania is killed and Sonny brutally beaten, with Apeman intending to decapitate him and present his severed head as a peace offering to the Black Hawks. Jake fights his way through the gang and saves Sonny, taking him home.

== Cast ==
- Temuera Morrison as Jake "the Muss" Heke
- Rena Owen as Beth Heke
- Julian Arahanga as Nig Heke
- Clint Eruera as Sonny Heke
- Taungaroa Emile as Mark "Boogie" Heke
- Nancy Brunning as Tania Rogers
- Tammy Davis as Mookie
- Eru Potaka-Dewes as Minata Kahu
- Lawrence Makoare as Grunt
- Pete Smith as Apeman
- Rawiri Paratene as Mulla Rota

== Performance ==
What Becomes of the Brokenhearted? enjoyed significant theatrical exposure and, as of 2007, was the fifth highest-grossing New Zealand film in the domestic market.

=== Critic reviews ===
Nick Grant of OnFilm Magazine praised the film as being a "sequel that equals" and was maybe better than the original.

=== New Zealand Film and TV Awards ===
What Becomes of the Broken Hearted? won nine of its 13 New Zealand Film Award nominations in 1999, including Best Director, Best Screenplay, Best Actor, Best Actress, Best Supporting Actor and Best Original Music.

== DVD release ==
In Australia, Becker issued the film on a double-disc with the previous film Once Were Warriors.
