= Broken English (1996 film) =

- Theatrical release poster
- Directed by: Gregor Nicholas
- Written by: Gregor Nicholas; Johanna Pigott
- Produced by: Robin Scholes; Timothy White; Janet McIver
- Starring: Aleksandra Vujčić; Julian Arahanga; Rade Šerbedžija; Marton Csokas
- Cinematography: John Toon
- Edited by: David Coulson
- Music by: Murray Grindlay; Murray McNabb
- Production companies: Village Roadshow Pictures; New Zealand Film Commission
- Distributed by: Roadshow Film Distributors Ltd.
- Release dates: 19 September 1996 (NZ); 2 May 1997 (US)
- Running time: 92 minutes
- Country: New Zealand
- Languages: English; Croatian; Māori; Japanese
- Box office: $541,377

Broken English is a 1996 New Zealand romantic drama film. Directed by Gregor Nicholas, it stars Aleksandra Vujčić, Julian Arahanga, Marton Csokas, and Rade Šerbedžija.

== Synopsis ==
Nina is the daughter of Ivan, a fierce Croatian patriarch whose family immigrated to Auckland, New Zealand to escape the Yugoslav Wars. She works as a waitress in a restaurant and falls in love with Eddie, a Māori chef, despite her father's objections. For a price, she agrees to marry a Chinese co-worker so that he (and his Chinese wife) can establish permanent residency. The money gives her the independence she needs to leave her parents' house and move in with Eddie. Complications arise when Eddie realises the depth of her father's fury and the strength of Nina's family ties.

== Cast ==
- Aleksandra Vujčić as Nina
- Julian Arahanga as Eddie
- Rade Šerbedžija as Ivan
- Marton Csokas as Darko
- Madeline McNamara as Mira
- Jing Zhao as Clara
- Li Yang as Wu
- Elizabeth Mavric as Vanya

== Production ==
Aleksandra Vujčić had never acted before and was discovered in an Auckland bar.

== NC-17 rating ==
On 20 September 1996, Broken English received an NC-17 rating from the Motion Picture Association of America for "Explicit Sexuality". Sony Pictures Classics attempted to appeal the rating to R, but the original rating was upheld. An edited R-rated version was released alongside the unedited NC-17 cut.

In response to the MPAA's decision, Nicholas released an official statement detailing his experience with their Appeals Board:

My encounter with the MPAA Appeals Board made it very clear to me that there is a perception in this country that a depiction of an intimate expression of love--or in this case "buttock thrusting," as it was described by one board member--is more dangerous to the youth of America than graphic scenes of violence, torture, rape and murder which they can see in any number of mainstream movies.

To me, there is something wrong with the system which tells us that exposure to acts of violence will leave young audiences untainted while exposure to acts of love will somehow corrupt them.

At the appeal, I sat in a kind of incredulous daze as I heard apparently educated people comment soberly that I "could have shot it another way, like from the waist up" and that "we've got to draw the line somewhere." I looked around the room and realized I was seriously outnumbered. Then came the clincher: "We can't expose the youth of America to buttock thrusting of this type." Clutching at straws I quickly speculated to myself as to what other kinds of buttock thrusting there were and whether or not they might be more acceptable. Was it the speed that was a problem? Was the thrusting too slow, too fast? I looked around again and it dawned on me: the thrusting was too real! These people were used to watching love scenes in which the actors looked like they were pretending to make love whereas we, in striving for realism, had created a scene in which two people appeared to be actually making love.

Whether they were or not will remain our secret...

== Reception ==
Broken English received generally positive reviews. On the review aggregator website Rotten Tomatoes, 82% of 17 critics' reviews are positive, with an average rating of 6.83/10.
