= Michael Brown (New Zealand priest) =

Anglican priest (1936–2024)

The Very Reverend Michael Brown CNZM OStJ ED
- Church: Anglican Church in Aotearoa, New Zealand and Polynesia

Orders
- Ordination: 1964

Personal details
- Born: Michael Henry Brown; 15 April 1936 Christchurch, New Zealand
- Died: 8 January 2024 (aged 87)
- Spouse: Anne Elizabeth Pierre (m. 1965)
- Education: Christchurch Boys' High School; University of Canterbury

Michael Henry Brown CNZM OStJ ED (15 April 1936 – 8 January 2024) was a New Zealand Anglican priest. After a range of clerical roles in Canterbury, he was Dean of Wellington Cathedral of St Paul from 1985 to 2002.

== Early life and family ==
Brown was born in Christchurch on 15 April 1936, the son of Catherine (née Dunn) and Harry Brown, a First World War artillery veteran. He was the youngest of three; he had an older sister, Jean (born 1923), and a brother, Peter (born 1929). Both predeceased him. He was educated at Christchurch Boys' High School. He saw military service with the Royal Regiment of New Zealand Artillery between 1955 and 1958, before going on to study at the University of Canterbury, graduating Bachelor of Commerce in 1963, and qualifying as an associate chartered accountant the same year. He later gained a Master of Business Administration degree from the University of South Bend, Indiana, United States, in 1991.

On 9 January 1965, Brown married Anne Elizabeth Pierre. at St Barnabas Church, Fendalton, in Christchurch.

== Priesthood ==
Brown completed study for the Licentiate of Theology and was ordained in the Diocese of Christchurch in 1964. After curacies in Linwood and Ashburton, he held incumbencies at Marchwiel, Burwood and Merivale. He was also Archdeacon of Rangiora and Westland.

Brown continued his military involvement with the Royal New Zealand Chaplains Department (RNZChD) between 1967 and 1984, and was awarded the Efficiency Decoration in 1983. During this time he was Chaplain to 3 Transport Company, Royal New Zealand Corps of Transport (RNZCT); 3 Field Regiment, Royal Regiment of New Zealand Artillery (RNZA); and Headquarters 3 Task Force Region (3TFR). During this period, he was also chaplain to the New Zealand Antarctic Programme, and Department of Scientific and Industrial Research (DSIR). In this capacity Brown visited Antarctica in 1978 and 1980. He was also a part-time chaplain for the New Zealand Police in Christchurch from the late 1970s, and was Chaplain Commandant of the RNZChD from 1995 to 2005.

From 1985 to 2002, Brown was the Dean of Wellington Cathedral. During this time, with the agreement of Archbishop Brian Davis, also Bishop of Wellington, he embarked on a campaign to complete the cathedral. Wellington Cathedral of St Paul had been built in stages in the 1960s and 1970s, and the nave remained about half the planned size, remaining disproportionate to the building as a whole. Owing to the cathedral's role in state and civic occasions, it was deemed appropriate to complete it according to the original plans. A major fundraising effort ensued, which raised over $6 million in 1998 dollars.

Following this, Brown became a Companion of the New Zealand Order of Merit.

Brown died on 8 January 2024, at the age of 87. He is survived by his wife Anne and two children, Michael Jr and Elizabeth.

== Honours and awards ==
In 1990, Brown was awarded the New Zealand 1990 Commemoration Medal. In 2001, he was appointed an Officer of the Order of St John. He was made a Companion of the New Zealand Order of Merit in the 1999 Queen's Birthday Honours, for services to the community.
