= Peter Bromhead =

New Zealand cartoonist (1933–2026)

Peter Bromhead MNZM
- Born: 31 May 1933; Portsmouth, England
- Died: 25 August 2026 (aged 93); Rotorua, New Zealand
- Citizenship: New Zealand
- Occupations: Designer; editorial cartoonist
- Employer: Auckland Star (1973–1989)

Peter Bromhead MNZM (31 May 1933 – 25 August 2026) was a New Zealand editorial cartoonist and commercial interior designer.

== Biography ==
Bromhead was born in Portsmouth, England, on 31 May 1933. His mother remarried after his father died and his stepfather's name was Bob Bromhead. His first job was as a window dresser in London and he trained as an industrial designer in England and Sweden. He migrated to New Zealand in the 1950s with his first wife, mother and step-father. He became a naturalised New Zealand citizen in 1979.

He always harboured a desire to be a cartoonist but worked as a designer of commercial interiors and furniture importer directing his company Bromhead Design. He was the editorial cartoonist for the Auckland Star from 1973 to 1989. He also drew cartoons for other publications including New Zealand Truth, The Dominion, The New Zealand Herald and the New Zealand Listener. He cartooned under his own name and the pseudonym Deighton.

In 2016 he published his memoir Bromhead: Scratching a Living.

Bromhead died in Rotorua on 25 August 2026, at the age of 93.

== Honours and awards ==
In the 1999 Queen's Birthday Honours, Bromhead was appointed a Member of the New Zealand Order of Merit, for services as a cartoonist. In 2008, he was made a life member as a Fellow of the Designers Institute of New Zealand. He was awarded the Danish Prince Henrik Medal of Honour for his design work.

Bromhead was described by Richard Long, former editor of the Dominion Post, as "probably the best pocket cartoonist operating in the British Commonwealth". He received 11 awards for cartooning at the Voyager Media Awards (previously Canon Media Awards and Qantas Media Awards).

== Publications ==
- The Best of Bromhead : Cartoons, 1975-78. (1978)
- The King and the Dragon : An Adult Fairy-Tale / written and illustrated by Bromhead. (1978)
- 4 Years’ Hard Labour (1988)
- Alternative Medicine : Humour and Cartoons (1992)
- Bromhead’s View : Ice-cream! Popcorn! Xenical! (1999)
- A Can of Worms! (2005) - a children's story
- Twinkle’s Big Adventure (2005) - a children's story
- The Box That Wanted to Be a Ball (2005) - a children's story
- The Disinformation Agent (2015) - spy thriller
- Bromhead: Scratching a Living (2016) - memoir
