= What Becomes of the Broken Hearted? (novel) =

1996 novel by Alan Duff

What Becomes of The Broken Hearted?
- Cover of Vintage paperback, 1998
- Author: Alan Duff
- Language: English
- Genre: Novel
- Publisher: Vintage
- Publication date: 1996
- Publication place: New Zealand
- Media type: Print (Hardback & Paperback)
- Pages: 253 pp
- ISBN: 0-09-183420-1
- OCLC: 36296335
- Preceded by: Once Were Warriors
- Followed by: Jake's Long Shadow

What Becomes of the Broken Hearted? is a 1996 novel by Alan Duff. It is the sequel to Duff's novel Once Were Warriors (1990), which was made into a film in 1994.

At the beginning of the book, Jake is alone except for a younger street kid who helped him at his lowest point at the end of Once Were Warriors. Estranged from his family, Jake slowly, accidentally, becomes more responsible and mature. He befriends a large family group of rugby-playing, pig-hunting Māori, contrasting with his son's entry into a gang of welfare-pooling petty criminals.

In 1999 the novel was adapted as the movie What Becomes of the Broken Hearted?.

What Becomes of the Broken Hearted? was followed by the third novel in the Once Were Warriors trilogy, Jake's Long Shadow (2002).
