= Julian Arahanga =

New Zealand actor

- Born: Julian Sonny Arahanga; 18 December 1972 (age 53); Raetihi, Manawatū-Whanganui, New Zealand
- Occupations: Actor, director
- Years active: 1983–present
- Partner: Becs (m.2009)
- Children: 3
- Relatives: Larry Parr (father); Tammy Davis (half-brother)

Julian Arahanga (born 18 December 1972) is a New Zealand actor and filmmaker.

== Career ==
In 1994, Arahanga played Nig Heke in Once Were Warriors. He later reprised the role in the 1999 sequel What Becomes of the Broken Hearted?.

In 1996, Arahanga starred in Broken English.

In 1999, Arahanga played the role of Apoc in The Matrix.

In 2008, Arahanga made his directorial debut with Turangarere, a documentary about John Pohe.

== Personal life ==
Arahanga was born in Raetihi, Manawatū-Whanganui to father Larry Parr and a mother of Estonian and Māori descent. He is the elder half-brother of actor Tammy Davis.

In 2009, Arahanga married Becs. Together, they run the production company Awa Films in Miramar.

== Filmography ==
- The Ferryman (2007) – Zane
- Eagle vs. Shark (2007) – Flight Extra
- Toy Boy (2004) – Angelo
- Fracture (2004) – Detective Harawira
- Forbidden Fury (2004)
- The Lost World (1999) (TV series) – Pintario
- The Matrix (1999) – Apoc
- What Becomes of the Broken Hearted? (1999) – Nig Heke
- Broken English (1996) – Eddie
- Hercules: The Legendary Journeys (1995–1996) (TV series) – Cassius (2 episodes)
- Once Were Warriors (1994) – Nig Heke
- The Makutu on Mrs Jones (1983) – Tawhai
