= Sam Healy =

Australian actress

- Born: Samantha Healy; Rockhampton, Queensland
- Other name: Sam Healy
- Education: Queensland University of Technology
- Occupation: Actress
- Years active: 1996–present

Samantha Healy (sometimes credited as Sam Healy) is an Australian actress perhaps best known for portraying Jazmina Hillerman on the Australian hospital drama, All Saints.

== Early life and education ==
Healy was born in Rockhampton, Queensland. After high school, Healy studied in Brisbane for a Bachelor of Arts in Drama. She graduated from Queensland University of Technology in 1996. Early work included appearances in commercials.

== Career ==
Television

Healy appeared in guest roles on the Australian television series Wildside (1997) and Children's Hospital, before her first appearance as Jazmina Hillerman on All Saints (February 1998).

Healy has made guest appearances on Water Rats (2000), Farscape (2001), The Lost World (2002), and had a recurring role in season two of the Canadian television series BeastMaster as the demon, Iara.

Healy appears as an extended guest regular on Blue Heelers (2006), the American television series Monarch Cove (2006), and McLeod's Daughters (2007), and as a series regular on Sammy J & Randy in Ricketts Lane (2015).

Film

Theatrical film appearances include roles in the 1999 films The Sugar Factory and Dear Claudia, followed by Peaches (2004), The Extra (2005), and The Condemned (2007).

== Filmography ==
=== Film ===
Samantha Healy film credits
Year	Title	Role	Ref.
1999	The Sugar Factory	Stephanie	
1999	Dear Claudia	Sara	
2004	Peaches	Jass	
2005	The Extra	Door Bitch	
2007	The Condemned	Bella	

=== Television ===
Samantha Healy television credits
Year	Title	Role	Notes	Ref.
1996	Strange but True?	Reconstruction Cast	Episode: "Alien Abduction"	
1997	Wildside	Candy	Episodes: 1.2, 1.3	
1998	Children's Hospital	Tamara	Episode: "No Escape"	
1998–1999	All Saints	Jazmina Hillerman	Main role (seasons 1–2)	
2000	The Magicians	Molly DeVane	Television film	
2000	Water Rats	Blaire Wenzel	Episode: "Family Ties"	
2000–2001	BeastMaster	The Demon Iara	Recurring role (season 2)	
2001	Farscape	Rylani Jeema Dellos	Episode: "Incubator"	
2002	The Lost World	Queen Zi-Zo	Episode: "Ice Age"	
2003	Stingers	Fiona Prentice / Kate Prentice	Episode: "Sex & Drugs & Deep House"	
2003	MDA	Martin Fallon	Episode: "Pas De Deux"	
2004	Blue Heelers	Donna Maitland	Recurring role (season 11)	
2005	Last Man Standing	Helen	Episode 1.4	
2006	Monarch Cove	Elizabeth De Brett	Main role	
2007	The Starter Wife	Zen-Oh Hostess	Episode: "Hour 1"	
2007	McLeod's Daughters	Ashleigh Redstaff	Recurring role (season 7)	
2012	Mrs Biggs	Sheree	Episode 1.4	
2015	Sammy J & Randy in Ricketts Lane	Victoria Vincent	Main role	
2017	House Husbands	Peta	Episode 5.9	
2020–2021	Neighbours	Natasha Leighton	3 episodes	
