= Aleksandra Vujcic =

Croatian-New Zealand actress (born 1973)

Aleksandra Vujcic (born 1973) is a Croatian-New Zealand actress best known for her acting appearances in 1990s films. She moved to New Zealand when she turned twenty and came to attention in the New Zealand film Broken English after being discovered in a bar.

== Select credits ==
- Broken English (1996)
- Dear Claudia (1999)
- Last Run (2001)
