= Christine Fernyhough =

New Zealand farmer, philanthropist and author

Christine Fernyhough CNZM ONZM
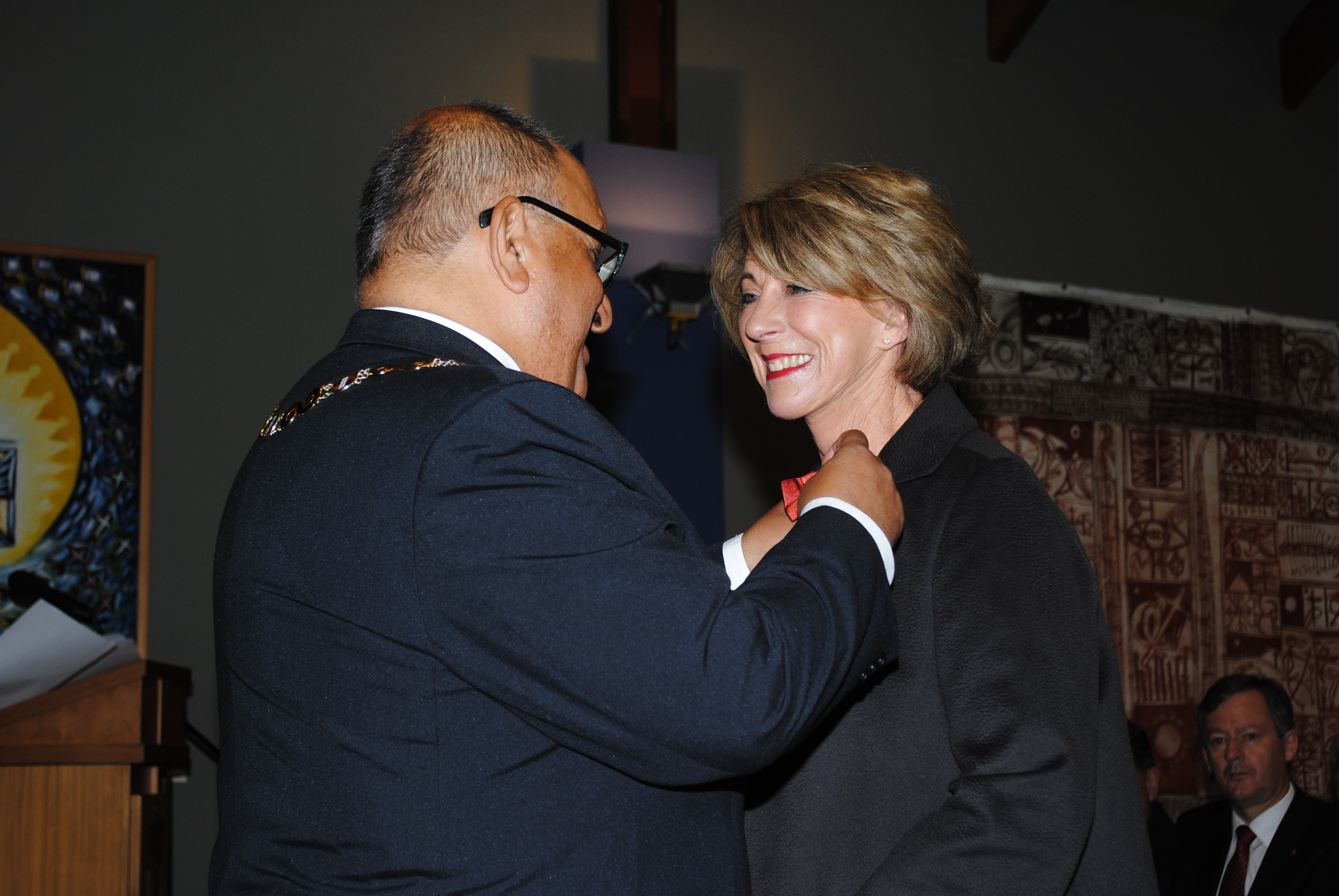
- Awards: Companion of the New Zealand Order of Merit

Christine Mary Fernyhough CNZM ONZM (nee Don) is a New Zealand farmer, philanthropist and author. In 1999 Fernhough was appointed an Officer of the New Zealand Order of Merit for services to education and the community. In 2011 she was appointed a Companion of the New Zealand Order of Merit for services to the community.

== Life ==
Fernyhough was the second of three children of Angus and Gladys Don, and grew up in Auckland, where she attended the Diocesan School for Girls. Fernyhough went to secretarial college, and then had three children with her first husband. She later met Colin John Fernyhough (1938–2003) at an art class, and the pair married. John Fernyhough became the first chairman of the Electricity Corporation of New Zealand.

In 1994 Fernyhough and Alan Duff co-founded the Duffy Books in Homes scheme, using commercial sponsorship and government support. The scheme aims to alleviate poverty and illiteracy by providing low-cost books to underprivileged children, thus encouraging them to read. By 2008, the scheme delivered 5 million books to schools around New Zealand. Fernyhough also founded a Gifted Kids Programme for high achieving children in low decile schools.

After John Fernyhough's death from cancer, which happened within three days of the death of her father, Fernyhough left Parnell and purchased Castle Hill station, a 4050 hectare property between the Torlesse and Craigieburn ranges in the South Island. Despite not having any farming background, Fernyhough made a success of the station, selling it ten years later in 2014 to move back to Parnell. Fernyhough wrote a memoir about life at the station, The Road to Castle Hill, published in 2011. The book is considered to have 'spawning a category of high country sheep station books' by publisher Nicola Legat. Fernyhough went on to write three children's books based on life at Castle Hill.

Fernyhough married Dress Smart founder John Bougen in 2008. The marriage ended in 2015.

In 2019 Fernyhough published a book about her mid-century collection of furniture, china and Kiwiana, kept at The Butterfly House, a bach at Mangawhai which she bought with her second husband. In 2022 she sold the Theo Schoon pieces from her collection for $246,000.

Fernyhough was the patron of a boot camp for unemployed young people, called the Limited Service Volunteers programme, run at Burnham Military Camp. She wrote in support of boot-camp style programmes when brought back by the government in 2023.

== Honours and awards ==
In the 1999 Queen's Birthday Honours Fernyhough was appointed an Officer of the New Zealand Order of Merit for services to education and the community. In the 2011 New Year Honours Fernyhough was appointed a Companion of the New Zealand Order of Merit for services to the community.

== Selected works ==
- Fernyhough, Christine (1 October 2019). Mid-Century Living: The Butterfly House Collection. RHNZ Godwit. ISBN 9780143772361.
- Fernyhough, Christine; Callan, Louise (16 December 2013). The Road to Castle Hill: A High Country Love Story. RHNZ Godwit. ISBN 9781775530947.
- Fernyhough, Christine; Bougen, John. Ben and Mark: Boys of the High Country.
- Dart of Castle Hill. Random House New Zealand. 1 August 2012. ISBN 9781869798284.
- Phylys the Farm Truck. Random House New Zealand. 4 October 2013. ISBN 978-1775535096.
