= Gerald Hensley =

New Zealand diplomat and public servant (1935–2024)

Gerald Christopher Philip Hensley CNZM (4 December 1935 – 10 February 2024) was a New Zealand diplomat and public servant.

== Early life and education ==
Born in Christchurch, Hensley was educated at St Bede's College, Christchurch and Canterbury University College where he took an MA with first-class honours in history.

== Career ==
Hensley joined the Department of External Affairs (now the Ministry of Foreign Affairs and Trade) in 1958 and served in Samoa, at the New Zealand Permanent Mission to the United Nations in New York City, and in 1965 was appointed Special Assistant to the Commonwealth Secretary-General when the Commonwealth Secretariat was established in London. He then served as Counsellor at the New Zealand Embassy in Washington. While in Washington, in April 1973, the Black September group painted slogans on the wall of his house and fired several shots through the windows. This was thought to have been the first Islamist-based terrorist attack in the United States. From 1976 until 1980, he was New Zealand's High Commissioner in Singapore.

In 1980, he returned to Wellington to become Head of the Prime Minister's Department, where he served under both Rob Muldoon and David Lange's administrations.

From 1987 to 1989, he was Co-ordinator of Domestic and External Security. He was then invited to become a Fellow at the Centre for International Affairs at Harvard University. While there he lectured on events in New Zealand's recent history.

In 1991, he became Secretary of Defence and served in that role until September 1999 when he retired. In the 1999 Queen's Birthday Honours, he was appointed a Companion of the New Zealand Order of Merit (CNZM), for public services, lately as Secretary of Defence. In 2000 he chaired the Commonwealth Eminent Persons Group, which advised the Papua New Guinea Government on the reconstruction of its armed forces.

== Post government career ==
From 2001 until 2007, he was president of the Asthma Foundation, and from 2011, he was co-chair of the Centenary History Programme commemorating the First World War.

Hensley published numerous articles on Asian and Pacific Affairs, including "Palm and Pine" a history of New Zealand's relations with Singapore, in "New Zealand and South East Asia"; and "A Crisis of Expectations – UN Peacekeeping in the 1990s: A Participants Point of View", edited by Ramesh Thakur and Carlyle A. Thayer.

A memoir about his time in the Ministry of Foreign Affairs and the Prime Minister's Department. "Final Approaches" was published by the Auckland University Press in 2006. Three years later his book "Beyond the Battlefield" on New Zealand and its allies in World War II was published by Penguin and was a finalist in the 2010 New Zealand Post Book Awards.

In May 2013, "Friendly Fire: Nuclear Politics and the Collapse of ANZUS, 1984–1987", was published by the Auckland University Press. "Friendly Fire" examines how New Zealand's anti-nuclear policy damaged ANZUS ties with the United States during the 1980s. This book uses recently declassified government documents from archives in New Zealand, Australia, the United States, and the United Kingdom.

Hensley was awarded an honorary Doctorate of Literature by Massey University in May 2015.

== Retirement and death ==
In retirement, Hensley lived on a vineyard in Martinborough, New Zealand. His wife Juliet died in May 2013. Gerald Hensley died in Martinborough on 10 February 2024, at the age of 88.

== Select bibliography ==
- "The History of Canterbury Vol II" Edited by James Hight and C Straubel (1971, Whitcombe & Tombes)
- Hensley, Gerald (2006). Final Approaches: A Memoir. Auckland: Auckland University Press. ISBN 1-86940-378-9.
- Hensley, Gerald (2009). Beyond the Battlefield: New Zealand and its Allies 1939-45. North Shore, Auckland: Viking/Penguin. ISBN 978-06-700-7404-4.
- Beyond the Battlefield: New Zealand and its allies 1939-45 by Gerald Hensley (2009, Viking, Auckland) ISBN 978-0-670-07404-4
- "Friendly Fire: Nuclear Politics and the Collapse of ANZUS, 1984-1987, by Gerald Hensley (2013, Auckland University Press, NZ) ISBN 978-1-86940-741-4
