= Rel Hunt =

Australian actor (born 1974)

- Born: Aurel Mitteldorfer; 15 August 1974 (age 51); Sydney, New South Wales, Australia
- Occupation: Actor
- Years active: 1993–2011

Aurel Mitterdorfer, professionally known as Rel Hunt, is an Australian actor, best known for his role as Ryan Scheppers in the television series Heartbreak High.

== Early life ==
Hunt was born Aurel Mitteldorfer, in Sydney, Australia on August 15, 1974. He is the oldest of four sons, born to a Hungarian father and an Australian mother.

At high school, Hunt was banned from acting classes for misbehaving. After finishing school, he began a Commerce degree at the University of New South Wales, and modelled on the side.

== Career ==
While modelling, Hunt landed a guest role in two episodes of Police Rescue. Following this, he had guest roles in Police Rescue: The Movie, G.P., Blue Heelers, Home and Away, Blue Heelers and several television commercials.

Within days of finishing his university degree, he earned the role of Ryan Scheppers in Heartbreak High, which he played from 1997 to 1999.

Hunt starred as Butch Yunkin in the made for television film, The Stalking of Laurie Show (2000). In 2005, he played Angus in Macbeth, an updated modern version of the Shakespeare play. That same year, he portrayed Al Corley in the fictionalised American television movie/docudrama Dynasty: The Making of a Guilty Pleasure, based on the creation and behind the scenes production of the 1980s prime time American soap opera Dynasty.

In 2011 Hunt starred in Underbelly: Razor, playing William Archer – Razor man and Crown Street bath house proprietor.

Hunt is a part of the rugby league back-to-back premiership winning team, the Eastern Suburbs Wombats.

== Personal life ==
Hunt dated actress Kelley McMaster while working together on Heartbreak High, after she played the part of Hunt's character Ryan's ex-girlfriend.

== Filmography ==
=== Film ===
Year	Title	Role	Type
1994	Police Rescue	Hugo	Television film
1996	Page 73	Danny	Short film
1999	Dear Claudia	Anton	Feature film
1999	Time and Tide	Justin	Television film
2000	Devil in the Flesh 2	Buddy Lyle	Film
2000	Cruel Intentions 2	Nigel Danby	Feature film
2000	Rivals (aka The Stalking of Laurie Show)	Butch Yunkin	Television film
2005	Dynasty: The Making of a Guilty Pleasure	Al Corley	Television film
2006	Macbeth	Angus	Feature film
2009	A Model Daughter: The Killing of Caroline Byrne	Peter Byrne	Television film

=== Television ===
Year	Title	Role	Type
1990; 1993; 2010	Home and Away	Brian / Dave Morgan / Street Kid	4 episodes
1993	Police Rescue	Dog	Episode: "Speeding"
1994	G.P.	Sean de Beer	Episode: "The Chicken Run"
1994	Blue Heelers	Ben Murphy	Episode: "A Matter of Trust"
1997–99	Heartbreak High	Ryan Scheppers	Seasons 5–7, 89 episodes
2001	Head Start	Jordan Gray	TV miniseries, 6 episodes
2002	Rocket Power	Tatupu, Māori (voice)	Episode: "Race Across New Zealand"
2002	Static Shock	Frankie D'Amico (voice)	Episode: "Pop's Girlfriend"
2003	Farscape	Karohm	Episode: "We're So Screwed Part 1: Fetal Attraction"
2005	Blue Water High	Casey	3 episodes
2005	The Alice	Kane	1 episode
2007	Sea Patrol	Captain Craig Bolt	Episode: "Through the Storm"
2011	Underbelly: Razor	William Archer	5 episodes
