= Oliver Duff (New Zealand editor) =

New Zealand writer and editor

Oliver Duff OBE (28 May 1883 – 2 March 1967) was a New Zealand writer and editor. In 1939 he was founding editor of the New Zealand Listener, a widely read magazine with a national monopoly on publishing radio and television programs.

== Biography ==
Duff was born in Waitahuna Gully, a gold mining town in Otago. He received his tertiary education at Otago and Canterbury Universities. At the age of 18 he volunteered for the South African war and on his return he won a scholarship to study for the Presbyterian ministry from the Synod of Otago and Southland. Influenced by writers such as Emerson and Thoreau he dropped out and became a journalist. He worked on a number of papers including the Sun in Christchurch, The Timaru Herald (as editor), The Press in Christchurch, as editorial assistant (under Michael Cormac Keane) then editor. At The Press he worked with writers such as Ngaio Marsh, M. H. Holcroft and Walter D'Arcy Cresswell. He resigned over his coverage of the Christchurch tramway strike, which the owners thought too sympathetic to the unions.

While he was editor of the North Canterbury Gazette in Rangiora, he contested the Hurunui electorate in the 1935 election as an independent candidate.

In 1938, Joe Heenan, under-secretary of internal affairs, appointed him editor for the forthcoming centennial publications. His contribution was New Zealand Now.

On 12 October 1908, at Dunedin, he married Jessie Barclay. They had three sons and a daughter, but divorced in 1937. As Jess Whitworth she published an autobiographical novel, Otago Interval in 1950. Their son Roger Duff (1912–1978) became an ethnologist and director of the Canterbury Museum. Their daughter Alison Duff (1914–2000) was a sculptor. Their son Gowan Duff (Pat), a forestry scientist, was father of novelist Alan Duff.

Oliver Duff remarried in 1946, to Ngaire Asquith Shankland, shortly before his retirement.
