= Jake's Long Shadow =

Book by Alan Duff

- Author: Alan Duff
- Language: English
- Subject: Gangster
- Publisher: Vintage Press, New Zealand
- Publication date: 2002
- Publication place: New Zealand
- Preceded by: Once Were Warriors; What Becomes of the Broken Hearted?

Jake's Long Shadow is a novel by Alan Duff, first published in 2002. It is the third book in the Once Were Warriors trilogy, following Jake "The Muss" Heke and his estranged family. Jake had previously driven his wife and children away because of his violent ways. The story shows new characters and their stories, such as Beth's new husband.

Unlike the previous two books, it has not had a film adaptation.

== Reception ==
Michele Hewitson of the The New Zealand Herald wrote: "Jake's Long Shadow is littered with parentheses. ... Reading Jake's Long Shadow you might find yourself shouting at the page: 'Oh do shut up, Alan.' Then you find you have been drawn into the story by the strength and rhythm of the writing.".
