= 1999 New Zealand bravery awards =

The 1999 New Zealand bravery awards were announced via a special honours list on 23 October 1999. The awards recognised 30 people, including six posthumously, for acts of bravery between 1989 and 1998.

== New Zealand Cross (NZC) ==
- Jacinda Margaret Amey – of Tuatapere.

On 24 April 1992 Ms Amey was one of five members of a Meteorological Service team, stationed on the remote sub-Antarctic Campbell Island, who were snorkelling when one of them, Mr Mike Fraser, was attacked by a shark, believed to be a white pointer. The other swimmers, apart from Ms Amey, swam to shore. Ms Amey waited until the shark moved away from Mr Fraser and then went to his aid and towed him to shore. Mr Fraser had lost his right forearm and his left forearm was severely lacerated and appeared to be broken. He was having trouble breathing and required urgent medical treatment. After getting him to shore, Ms Amey joined the rest of the team in doing what they could for Mr Fraser until he could be flown to New Zealand. Ms Amey displayed great courage and bravery with complete disregard for her own safety in going to Mr Fraser's assistance.

- Reginald John Dixon – of Palmerston North. Posthumous award.

On 9 June 1995, Mr Dixon, aged 47, and his wife were passengers on Ansett Flight 703 when the aircraft crashed in the Tararua Ranges near Palmerston North. Mr Dixon escaped from the wreckage with fractures. However, despite his injuries, he returned to the aircraft to help other passengers trapped in the wreckage. As a result of this selfless action, he was critically burned when a flash fire broke out on the left wing of the aircraft near a hole in the fuselage from which he was helping passengers escape. He was hospitalised and underwent surgery and skin grafts. Mr Dixon remained in a coma, and although he made some initial improvement, his condition worsened and he died two weeks later, the fourth victim of the crash. The situation in which Mr Dixon found himself was extremely dangerous and he displayed great bravery in returning to the aircraft, although injured, to help other passengers which subsequently resulted in the loss of his own life. His bravery undoubtedly ensured that the loss of life was not greater.

== New Zealand Bravery Star (NZBS) ==
- Robert Edwin (Rob) Hall MBE – of Christchurch. Posthumous award.

On Friday 10 May 1996, Mr Hall was descending from the summit of Mt Everest, in the Himalayas, following his 11-strong expedition’s attempt on the peak, when a blizzard developed. From the Hillary Step, just below the summit, Mr Hall called on the radio for oxygen and assistance for an American climber in the party who had collapsed. Other parties on the descent were unable to reascend due to the storm, yet Mr Hall refused entreaties to descend without the stricken climber. Fellow New Zealand mountaineer, Mr Andrew Harris, did attempt to reach them, but the American climber died during the night. Mr Hall made his way down to the South Summit where early on 11 May he contacted Base Camp by radio. Exhausted and frostbitten, he was unable to descend further. When informed of a failed rescue attempt later that day he responded with dignity and courage. His last communication by radio and satellite link was to give encouragement to his expectant wife in New Zealand. Out of oxygen, he succumbed to the cold some time during the Saturday night. Mr Hall understood that by remaining behind with the American climber he reduced greatly his own chances of survival. His selflessness in deciding to remain with him was an outstanding act of bravery.

- Andrew Michael Harris – of New Plymouth. Posthumous award.

On 10 May 1996 Mr Harris, a guide in an expedition on Mount Everest, in the Himalayas, attempted to go to the aid of Mr Robert Edwin Hall and an American climber who were stranded on the Hillary Step below the summit, and shortly afterwards perished in a blizzard. Mr Harris, hearing by radio Rob Hall's calls for help, turned from the safety of descending the mountain to go back up towards the summit ridge of Everest to assist Mr Hall and the other climber. Despite his own exhaustion, and knowing that his only chance of survival lay in descending, Mr Harris chose to go back up the mountain to try to help Mr Hall. Mr Harris was not heard of again although Mr Hall reported in a radio message that "Andy was with me last night..." and Mr Harris’ ice axe and jacket were later found on the South Summit next to Mr Hall’s body. To go to the aid of a fellow guide in the face of the most appalling conditions was an outstanding act of bravery.

- Walter Bruce Butler – of Napier.

On the morning of 7 December 1998, Mr Butler, aged 76, heard screams for help from a neighbour, a sixteen year old girl, who was being attacked by a young male wielding a large knife. The youth appeared intent on sexually violating the girl and had stabbed her several times in the upper back. Mr Butler rushed to the girl’s aid and in doing so was himself savagely attacked by the youth who left the scene when passengers from a passing car stopped to assist. Mr Butler received wounds to his face and body which required over 400 stitches. Mr Butler’s actions may well have saved the girl’s life and he was fortunate not to have lost his own. He displayed outstanding bravery.

== New Zealand Bravery Decoration (NZBD) ==
- Terence Albert Hood.

On the evening of 4 July 1989 Mr Hood, a security guard, accompanied an electrician as he carried out routine tests on newly installed 11,000 volt oil circuit breakers in the MED substation located in an area under construction at the Defence Department Building, Stout Street, Wellington. The electrician noticed there was a serious problem as one of the circuits breakers had been installed with no oil in the contact chamber. As he switched off the circuit breaker it exploded throwing out molton copper and flames. It also threw the electrician against a wall opposite the exit and blasted Mr Hood backwards out of the door. However, hearing the cries from the electrician, who was on fire he came back into the room past the burning equipment and dragged the electrician to safety and used his bare hands to extinguish the man’s burning hair and clothes. Mr Hood’s actions saved the life of the electrician.

- Allan Donald Cantley – of Morrinsville; sergeant, New Zealand Police.

At Morrinsville on 29 July 1993, a mentally deranged man with a number of explosive devices strapped to his body, entered the Police Station. He held both the Police and three members of the public hostage and threatened to detonate bombs attached to his body. Sergeant Cantley entered the building and confronted the man and was able to facilitate most of the hostages’ escapes, including his own. Sergeant Cantley then re-entered the building in an attempt to release the remaining hostage and overpower the man. Together with two other members of the Police he was able to achieve the release of the hostage but during this another Police Constable was wounded and the offender was fatally shot by Police. Throughout the incident Sergeant Cantley showed complete disregard for his own safety.

- Christopher Michael Crean – of New Plymouth. Posthumous award.

On 13 March 1996 Mr Crean witnessed a confrontation between two gangs in the New Plymouth suburb of Marfell where he lived. A young man was severely beaten in front of a number of people. Mr Crean was the only witness to this brutal assault who was prepared to testify against the assailants. Despite enormous intimidation, including verbal death threats made by gang members at the Court, Mr Crean did not waver and he insisted on giving evidence against the gang members involved. His performance of his civic duty encouraged other witnesses to come forward, as a result of which gang activity in the area was curtailed and successful prosecution of two of the three defendants ensued. However, on 6 October 1996, Mr Crean, then aged 27, answering a knock at the front door of his home, was gunned down in the presence of his wife and young children. Four members of a gang are now serving life sentences for his murder. Mr Crean’s performance of his civic duty undoubtedly placed his life in danger, with subsequent tragic consequences.

- Graeme James Hunt – of Hastings.

At Flaxmere on 21 April 1996 Mr Hunt was at his home when he heard a noise like a gun shot. Going outside, he saw a police car on the street in front of his house. He ran to the vehicle, accompanied by his two daughters, aged 12 and 10 years, where they discovered a shot police officer lying by the car. As Mr Hunt attempted to assist the officer, another bullet travelled in front of Mr Hunt, lodging in the driver’s door of the car. Looking up, he saw a man in another car pointing a rifle at him through the vehicle’s window, only some 5 to 6 metres in front of the police car. At this time Mr Hunt was with the constable between the two doors of the police car, the eldest daughter was standing in front of the car and the youngest behind her father. Mr Hunt moved quickly to the rear corner of the police car, before a further shot was fired, which also lodged in the driver’s door. The other car then left the scene, after which Mr Hunt returned to the constable, whose wounds were unfortunately fatal. Mr Hunt placed his own life at risk to help the fatally wounded police officer.

- Warren Gilbert Sloss – of Wanganui; constable, New Zealand Police.

On 12 October 1996, Constable Sloss responded to a call from a woman about the presence of her former boyfriend at her house. After accompanying her there from another address, he followed her inside. The boyfriend appeared from behind a door and attacked the woman with a large knife. Constable Sloss intervened and was himself attacked with the knife. The woman, who had suffered repeated blows from the knife in an attempt to kill her, was able to leave the house to get help, convinced that the Constable was about to be killed. Constable Sloss was then engaged in a fight for his life, being stabbed three times in the back, once in the abdomen, once in the right forearm, and a serious injury to his left hand. However, he succeeded in overpowering and handcuffing the man, before calling for assistance. The Constable’s actions saved the life of the intended victim at the cost of his own severe injuries.

- Hakihana Jackson Pomare – of Matauri Bay. Posthumous award.

At Matauri Bay, on the evening of 21 June 1997, Hakihana Pomare, aged 11 years, rescued his younger brother from their burning temporary accommodation. He re-entered the burning structure, amid thick smoke and intense heat, to rescue another brother and his sister but all three tragically died in the fire. He displayed exceptional bravery.

== New Zealand Bravery Medal (NZBM) ==
- Private Brendon Drew Burchell – of Auckland; Royal New Zealand Infantry Regiment (Retired).
- Private David Edward Whawhai Stewart – of Whakatāne; Royal New Zealand Infantry Regiment. Posthumous award.
- Private Sonny Wayne Terure – of Auckland; Royal New Zealand Infantry Regiment (Retired).

Privates Burchell, Stewart and Terure were members of an Army Adventurous Training Course which became trapped near the summit of Mount Ruapehu by extremely adverse weather conditions on 11 August 1990. The next morning the party decided to move from the shelter of snow caves to the Dome Shelter, a distance of approximately 400 metres. They had covered approximately 250 metres when weather conditions forced them to stop and seek temporary shelter on an exposed feature. After some time in this location, two of the party succumbed to hypothermia and the others began to make the casualties comfortable. In the afternoon, two members of the party left to attempt to get assistance. As more of the party began to show signs of hypothermia, they were placed in their sleeping bags in what shelter there was. Despite the continuing high winds and windblown snow, Privates Stewart and Terure maintained a continual vigil over their companions throughout most of the night, providing what assistance they could. When it became obvious that assistance was required, Private Burchell, although he had no previous mountaineering experience, volunteered to accompany one of the instructors to descend the mountain. The weather conditions were still extreme with windblown snow, limited visibility, darkness and a high wind chill factor. The pair were continually blown off course by the winds and, as a result, had to traverse treacherous terrain including several steep bluffs with limited direction finding assistance. Some eleven hours later, they eventually managed to raise the alarm to enable a full search and rescue operation to be mounted. Private Burchell not only had to cope with the most extreme conditions but, because of his lack of experience, had no knowledge of how to adequately overcome them. His courage, determination and perseverance to continue in the face of extraordinary adversity not only brought great credit on himself, but certainly assisted in the rescue of five survivors from Mount Ruapehu the next day. When a rescue party arrived at the scene about midday on 13 August, Private Stewart was found to have died during the night. Private Stewart would have been fully aware that his actions in continually moving out of shelter and the warmth of his sleeping bag to assist those of the party who were affected by hypothermia, meant that he had an increased chance of also becoming a casualty. He was also aware that he was becoming increasingly exhausted by the continual battling of the elements. Privates Stewart and Terure displayed selfless care of the casualties and their sense of responsibility to their companions testify to their bravery.

- Keith Desmond Troon – of Rangiora.
- Ross William McEwan – of Kaiapoi.

On 22 January 1991 Mr Troon and Mr McEwan, employees of the Alliance Freezing Company, were alerted by a Sub-foreman that two contractors were in real trouble in a stickwater tank at the Alliance Rendering Plant at Kaiapoi. Both men were very experienced at rescue work. The contractors, a father and son, were cleaning the tank when they were overcome by lack of oxygen and toxic fumes. Mr Troon and Mr McEwan entered the tank and did their very best to lift the men through the manhole opening in the hope that they might be resuscitated. Their efforts were unsuccessful and the men died. Both Mr Troon and Mr McEwan were admitted to hospital for observation following the incident.

- Anne Michele Francis (formerly Holdsworth) – of Rotorua.

Mrs Francis, while an Ambulance Officer with the Wellington Free Ambulance, on the evening of 2 September 1991, attended an incident involving a man who had taken an overdose of drugs. The patient confronted her with a loaded firearm. During a period of some 30 minutes Mrs Holdsworth persuaded the patient to put the weapon down and talked to him until the Police arrived. Her calmness and patience in an extremely difficult situation almost certainly prevented injury to a colleague, Police Officers and herself.

- Tracey Lee-Anne Chapman – of Timaru.
- Karen Ruth Foster – of Timaru.
- Jan Yvonne McCrea – of Ashburton.

In the early evening of 4 January 1992 a fire broke out in Otipua Block at Talbot Hospital, Timaru. Mrs Chapman, a hospital aide, Mrs Foster and Mrs McCrea, both staff nurses, calmly ensured that all patients were safely evacuated. Mrs Chapman and Mrs McCrea were on duty in Otipua Block when the fire broke out. With no regard for personal safety, Mrs Chapman and Mrs McCrea removed the three patients in the room where the fire started. Immediately after the patients were removed, the windows exploded. Black smoke in the room was down to eye-level at this time. Mrs Chapman continued to remove patients, while Mrs McCrea advised Mrs Foster, on duty in the other building, of the fire, and closed smoke stop doors. Eleven patients were evacuated by the three women before the fire brigade and police arrived. They then assisted with the evacuation of the remainder of the 35 patients by repeatedly entering the smoke-filled building until all were safely removed. All three women were in danger from smoke-inhalation. Mrs Chapman and Mrs McCrea, in the initial stages of the rescue, were in danger of being burnt by the flames, lacerated by shattering glass, and trapped by possible ceiling collapse. The actions of Mrs Chapman, Mrs Foster and Mrs McCrea, helped avert what could have been a major tragedy.

- William John Funnell MBE – of Taupō.

On the evening of 24 April 1992 Mr Funnell, chief pilot of the Taupo-based New Zealand Rail rescue helicopter, a Squirrel, made a flight to uplift from the remote Campbell Island a man, Mr Mike Fraser, who had been attacked by a shark. Mr Funnell was accompanied by another pilot and a paramedic. The rescue operation successfully carried Mr Fraser to Invercargill Hospital, and he made a good recovery from his ordeal. The Squirrel touched down again at Taupo 25 hours after the request to make the trip. The flight over some 1200 kilometres of ocean was believed to be unprecedented anywhere in the world in terms of single-engine helicopter operations and was undertaken at considerable risk to those on board. Mr Funnell displayed bravery in undertaking this flight without which the shark attack victim would not have survived.

- Stephen Robert Gibb – of Nelson.

On the morning of 27 June 1992 Mr Gibb was the pilot of a helicopter taking six teenage Australian tourists on a scenic flight over the Fox Glacier. While flying up the Glacier, at about 2,500 feet, his helicopter faced an oncoming fixed wing aircraft. The wing of the aircraft embedded itself in the nose cone of the helicopter and made the anti-torque pedals, which control the helicopter, inoperable, tore the doors of the pilot’s side and damaged the directional controls. As a result of the impact Mr Gibb’s right foot was shattered. Mr Gibb, despite his injuries and the damage to the helicopter, managed an emergency landing without any loss of life or injuries to his passengers. The pilot of the aeroplane was killed when his aircraft crashed after the impact with the helicopter.

- Driver Mark Mattie Povey – of Helensville; Royal New Zealand Corps of Transport (Retired).

On 17 September 1993, while travelling home from work, in the company of his sister, Driver Povey came upon a motor accident involving a motor vehicle and a motor cycle. The motor cycle and driver were trapped under the vehicle and the motor cycle had exploded on impact. Both vehicles were engulfed in flames and there was an imminent danger of either or both exploding. Driver Povey quickly assessed the situation and sent his sister to a nearby house to alert the emergency services. With complete disregard for his personal safety, Driver Povey then attempted to save the driver of the car. The driver was trapped in the car with his leg on fire, but Driver Povey managed to free the trapped leg and drag him clear of the burning vehicles. Unfortunately, and unknown to Driver Povey, the driver of the vehicle was already dead. The rider of the motor cycle was not able to be recovered and remained under the wreckage where he was burnt beyond recognition. Although Driver Povey was not able to save either of the two accident victims, he acted decisively displaying selfless courage and with complete disregard for his personal safety.

- Dean William Pleydell – of Taupō; constable (now senior constable), New Zealand Police.
- Patrick Anthony Rice – of Auckland; constable, New Zealand Police.

On 23 September 1993, Constables Pleydell and Rice pursued a man in a motor vehicle who had just committed an armed robbery of a bank in Auckland City. The offender abandoned his getaway vehicle and threatened two members of the public with a loaded pistol. Fearing for the safety of these people the two unarmed constables approached the gunman and Constable Pleydell confronted him but, despite being knocked off balance by a moving Police vehicle, the gunman levelled his pistol at Constable Pleydell. Fearing that the offender would shoot, Constable Rice tackled the man and was able to knock him to the ground, which gave both constables the opportunity of overpowering and subduing the offender. Constable Rice’s actions almost certainly saved the life of Constable Pleydell and in doing so he assisted in the apprehension of one of the country’s most wanted criminals.

- Flight Sergeant Helicopter Crewman Michael James Cannon – of Auckland; Royal New Zealand Air Force.
- Sergeant Helicopter Crewman Lisa Kay Franken (née De Waal) – of Melbourne; Royal New Zealand Air Force.

On 10 July 1994 a crippled Taiwanese fishing vessel, the long liner Kin Sin II which had suffered an ammonia explosion, was located 25 nautical miles south of Viti Levu in the Fiji group. The explosion and resultant fire had destroyed the ship’s only life-raft and not all the 23 crew members were equipped with life jackets. Two Iroquois helicopters from a Number 3 Squadron Detachment, RNZAF, based in Fiji were tasked with carrying out a rescue mission. Flight Sergeant Helicopter Crewman Cannon and Sergeant Helicopter Crewman Franken were winched onboard the Kin Sin II to take charge of the rescue. Their efforts were hampered by the rolling deck of a burning and sinking ship, no communications with the Iroquois and an inability to communicate with the seamen, only one of whom was discovered to speak English late in the rescue. The vessel sank soon after the successful rescue of all 23 seamen. Both rescuers had only graduated as Helicopter Crew Members one month prior to this incident and were on their first search and rescue mission. In unfamiliar and difficult conditions they displayed courage and professionalism.

- Peter Robert Broughton – of Palmerston North; senior constable, New Zealand Police.
- Floyd Steven Pratt – Te Puke; constable, New Zealand Police.

In the evening of 11 October 1994 Senior Constable Broughton and Constable Pratt were in a party of four police officers, one with a dog, which entered a house at Palmerston North at night under the provisions of Section 317 of the Crimes Act. They were in pursuit of a man who had just been seen lurking in the vicinity of houses, and who had assaulted one of the constables. Once inside, this man again assaulted the constable, while a woman confronted Constable Pratt with a baseball bat and used it to hit the dog on the head. Senior Constable Broughton ran up some stairs to disarm the woman, but another man then used the bat to hit him several times on the body and head. Constable Pratt went to his assistance, but by this time Senior Constable Broughton had received further blows, suffering serious injuries to his head and multiple bone fractures to his hands and was unable to defend himself. Constable Pratt could hear the sound of breaking bone and crushing flesh, and could see the amount of blood his colleague was losing. Senior Constable Broughton was then hit over the head again. However, Constable Pratt was able to drag him down the stairs, where they decided to try to disarm the man. Constable Pratt, using his short baton, led the way up the stairs where the baton was smashed and be suffered a dislocated finger and a graze to the head. Further blows were then struck with the bat, but the two constables were eventually able to overpower and arrest the man. Senior Constable Broughton later underwent surgery to his serious injuries, while Constable Pratt was treated at hospital and discharged.

- John Joseph McNamee – of Perth.

Mr McNamee, an employee of Alpine Guides Ltd, was guiding one of two groups on 11 July 1997 when he and four skiers in his party were buried in an avalanche five kilometres from Mt Cook, in the Southern Alps / Kā Tiritiri o te Moana. Mr McNamee managed to free his pack, get his shovel out and then dig himself out in a very short period of time. With a quick scan of the area, he spotted visual signs of two of his skiers who were completely buried except that each had a hand visible. The priority was to free these skiers to the extent that they had clear airways and could breathe. Once this was accomplished, he located the other two skiers, one of whom had stopped breathing. Mr McNamee administered CPR by which time four other guides, who had been working nearby, had been summoned by Mr McNamee when the avalanches first started, had arrived and they were followed by other rescue personnel. All those buried by the avalanches were suffering to some extent from hypothermia and with the possibility of undetected injuries, it was decided to fly three of the skiers to Christchurch Hospital. All were released the next day. There is no doubt that if Mr McNamee had not managed to free himself and the others in such a short period, there would have been multiple fatalities.
