= Alan Duff =

New Zealand writer

Alan Duff MBE
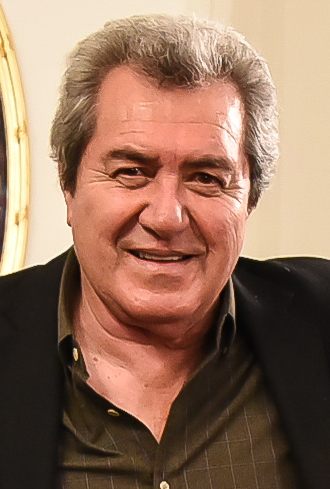
- Duff in 2019
- Born: 26 October 1950 (age 76); Rotorua, New Zealand
- Occupation: Author
- Writing career
- Genre: Fiction
- Notable works: Once Were Warriors; What Becomes of the Broken Hearted? (novel); Jake's Long Shadow; What Becomes of the Broken Hearted? (film)

Alan Duff MBE (born 26 October 1950) is a New Zealand novelist and newspaper columnist. His novel Once Were Warriors (1990) was made into a film of the same name in 1994.

== Biography ==
Alan Duff was born in Rotorua, New Zealand, the son of forestry scientist Gowan Duff (1910–1995), known as Pat, and Hinau Josephine Duff (née Raimona), known as Kuia, of Ngāti Rangitihi and Ngāti Tūwharetoa descent, and grandson of writer Oliver Duff (1883–1967). He was born and raised in a State housing area in Rotorua. Oliver Duff was a writer and foundation editor of the New Zealand Listener, and Duff inherited his grandfather's love of literature.

Duff's parents separated when he was 10, and Duff moved in with a Māori uncle and aunt at Whakarewarewa. He wrote at some length about his troubled childhood in his 1999 memoir, Out of the Mist and the Steam. Many of these experiences informed his novel Once Were Warriors.

Duff was expelled from his school Rotorua Boys' High School and ran away from home, ending up as a State ward at Hamilton Boys' Home. Later he lived with another uncle, anthropologist Roger Duff, and went back to school at Christchurch Boys' High School. At 15 he was sentenced to a term in Waikeria Borstal for assault and breaking and entering.

After leaving school, Duff worked as an installer of sheet metal insulation and sang in a band. He had a partner, with whom he had two children.

In the late 1970s, Duff lived in England. He worked as an installer of sheet metal insulation, then as a barman and bar manager. However, he then again migrated to a criminal life, and in 1979 was sentenced to 19 months in jail. While in England, Duff had a partner, Paula, and daughter, Katea.

Duff began writing full-time in 1985 and had Once Were Warriors published in 1990.

== Writing ==
Duff began to write full-time in 1985. He tried writing a thriller as his first novel, but it was rejected. He burned the manuscript and started writing Once Were Warriors (1990), which had an immediate and great impact. The novel is written in juxtaposed interior monologues, making its style stand out from other works. It was winner of the PEN Best First Book Award, was runner-up in the Goodman Fielder Wattie Award, and was made into the award-winning film of the same name in 1994.

One Night Out Stealing, appeared in 1991 and was shortlisted in the 1992 Goodman Fielder Wattie Book Awards.

Duff was awarded the Frank Sargeson Fellowship in 1991, and began writing a weekly—later bi-weekly – column for The Evening Post, syndicated to eight other newspapers. In this, and in his 1993 analysis, Māori: The Crisis and the Challenge, he has developed his ideas on the failures of Māoridom, castigating both the traditional leadership and the radical movement for dwelling on the injustices of the past and expecting others to resolve them, instead of encouraging Māori to get on and help themselves. The blame for Māori underperformance he puts squarely back on Māori, for not making the most of the opportunities given them.

State Ward started as a series of episodes on radio in 1993 and was published as a novella in 1994.

The Duffy Books in Homes scheme, co-founded in 1995 by Duff and Christine Fernyhough, with commercial sponsorship and government support, aims to alleviate poverty and illiteracy by providing low-cost books to underprivileged children, thus encouraging them to read. In its first year alone it put about 180,000 new books in the hands of about 38,000 children. By 2008, the scheme delivered 5 million books to schools around New Zealand.

What Becomes of the Broken Hearted? (1996), the sequel to Once Were Warriors, was the winner of the fiction section of the 1997 Montana Book Awards and was also made into a film What Becomes of the Broken Hearted? in 1999. Two Sides of the Moon was published in 1998. Duff wrote his own memoir, Out of the Mist and the Steam, in 1999. His first novel to be set outside of New Zealand is Szabad (2001). Inspired by the stories of people Duff met during his several trips to Hungary, the story takes place in Budapest during the 1956 Hungarian Revolution. Jake's Long Shadow (2002) is the third volume in Duff's Once Were Warriors trilogy. In 2003 Once Were Warriors was brought to the stage across New Zealand as a musical drama.

Duff regularly writes for the New Zealand Herald.

=== Published works ===
- Once Were Warriors. 1990.
- One Night Out Stealing. 1991.
- State Ward. 1994.
- Duff, Alan (1996). What Becomes of the Broken Hearted?. Vintage. ISBN 9781869413101.
- Two Sides of the Moon. 1998.
- Out of the Mist and the Steam. 1999.
- Duff, Alan (2000). Alan Duff's Maori heroes. Random House New Zealand. ISBN 186941425X.
- Szabad. 2001.
- Jake's Long Shadow. 2002.
- Who Sings for Lu?. 2009.
- Duff, Alan (2019). A Conversation with my Country. Random House New Zealand. ISBN 9780143773269.

== Personal life ==
In September 2007, he was arrested while speeding near Taupō. On 30 March 2008, he appeared in the Taupō District Court at a defended hearing and was represented by prominent barrister Antony Shaw. Duff pled not guilty to failing to remain at a scene after being stopped, failing to stop for police and two charges of resisting police. He was also allegedly abusive and uncooperative. During the alleged incident, he was stopped and then took off. After a pursuit, he allegedly swung a policewoman around by the handcuffs as she was attempting to restrain him. The charges were later dismissed by the Taupō District Court, Judge McGuire saying: "the result however, is that I am left uneasy over whether police prosecutorial power was used wisely and fairly in this instance...". However a high court judge subsequently ruled that the judge erred and police could detain a driver while carrying out checks, although he did not require that the charges be relaid.

In the 1995 New Year Honours, Duff was appointed a Member of the Order of the British Empire, for services to literature.

On 16 June 2011, Duff declared himself bankrupt, owing creditors NZ$3.6 million. As of March 2013, he was living in France and visiting New Zealand several times a year.
