= Taungaroa Emile =

New Zealand actor

- Born: New Zealand
- Occupation: Actor

Taungaroa Emile is a New Zealand actor. He played Boogie in Once Were Warriors and its sequel What Becomes of the Broken Hearted?. He starred as Mako in Flight of the Albatross, as Soul in No. 2 and Tipene Johnson in The Market Other appearances include Willie in Whale Rider, episodes of Taonga, Aroha, and Shortland Street, and the TV film Tangiwai: A Love Story.

Emile won the 1994 New Zealand Film and TV Award for Best Juvenile Performance for 'Once Were Warriors.
