= Duffy Books in Homes =

Literacy charity

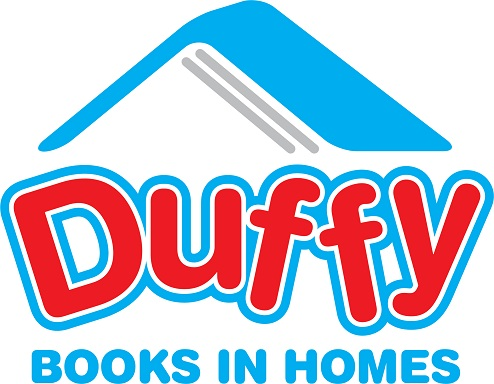
- Type: Charitable Foundation
- Industry: Education
- Founded: 1994
- Headquarters: Auckland, New Zealand
- Key people: Alan Duff, Founder; Kevin Drinkwater, Chairman; Linda Vagana, General Manager
- Services: Education, literacy
- Revenue: 5,588,959 New Zealand dollar (2024)
- Total assets: 13,015,085 New Zealand dollar (2024)
- Number of employees: 15–20
- Website: www.booksinhomes.org.nz

Duffy Books in Homes is the trading name of The Alan Duff Charitable Foundation. It is a New Zealand registered, literacy-focused charitable organization which has links to similar organisations in the United States and Australia.

== History ==
The programme was conceived in 1992 when the author Alan Duff visited Camberley School in Hastings, New Zealand. According to Principal Peter Johnstone "Alan was appalled to see so many children come from bookless homes."

Following a meeting with philanthropist Christine Fernyhough in 1994 the Alan Duff Charitable Foundation was legally formed. The official launch of the programme (then known as Books in Homes) took place at Tairangi School in Wellington on 24 August 1995 and was attended by then Prime Minister Jim Bolger.

The programme began with 80 schools, 16,000 students and 14 sponsors. In 2020 the programme reported almost 510 schools, over 200 Early Childhood Centres, over 100,000 students and more than 200 funding partners and supporters.

In 2019 the programme celebrated its 25th year and 13 millionth gifted book with respective events at Government House with Governor-General of New Zealand Dame Patsy Reddy and New Zealand Parliament with Prime Minister Jacinda Ardern.

Notable personalities who were once students in Duffy Books in Homes schools include BMX rider Sarah Walker and Miss World New Zealand 2010 Cody Yerkovich.

== Operations ==
The programme has a stated aim of inspiring "a love of books in Duffy children so they become adults who inspire a love of reading." Its core function is as a form of book club in which students at low decile primary and intermediate schools in New Zealand order books from a brochure which are then presented at role model assemblies at the end of three school terms. Each child participating receives a minimum of six new books each year.

Additional components of the programme include annual awards for parents and grandparents, effort in reading and writing and excellence in attitude. There are also weekly book awards for good behaviour.

Two troupes of performers visit the majority of schools in the programme annually to perform a literacy-focused stage show. In 2024 the Duffy Theatre performs a show entitled 'Calling Detective Duffy - Stat!'.

The programme is also offered to early childhood education centres under the name 'Ready 4 Reading'.

== Funding ==
Duff stipulated that schools bear some of the cost of funding the programme themselves. Schools fund approximately one third of the cost of the programme with the remaining costs being met by the New Zealand Government and private sponsorship.

Major supporters include Mainfreight, Scholastic, Ernst & Young, Carter Holt Harvey, Rotary, Latitude Financial Services and The Warehouse.

== Results ==
Research undertaken in 1996 and 1997 by Dr Warwick Elley suggested that year 5 and 6 children in eight schools "improved (their reading ability) by 35% more than they would have without the Duffy Programme."
