= Rena Owen =

New Zealand actress

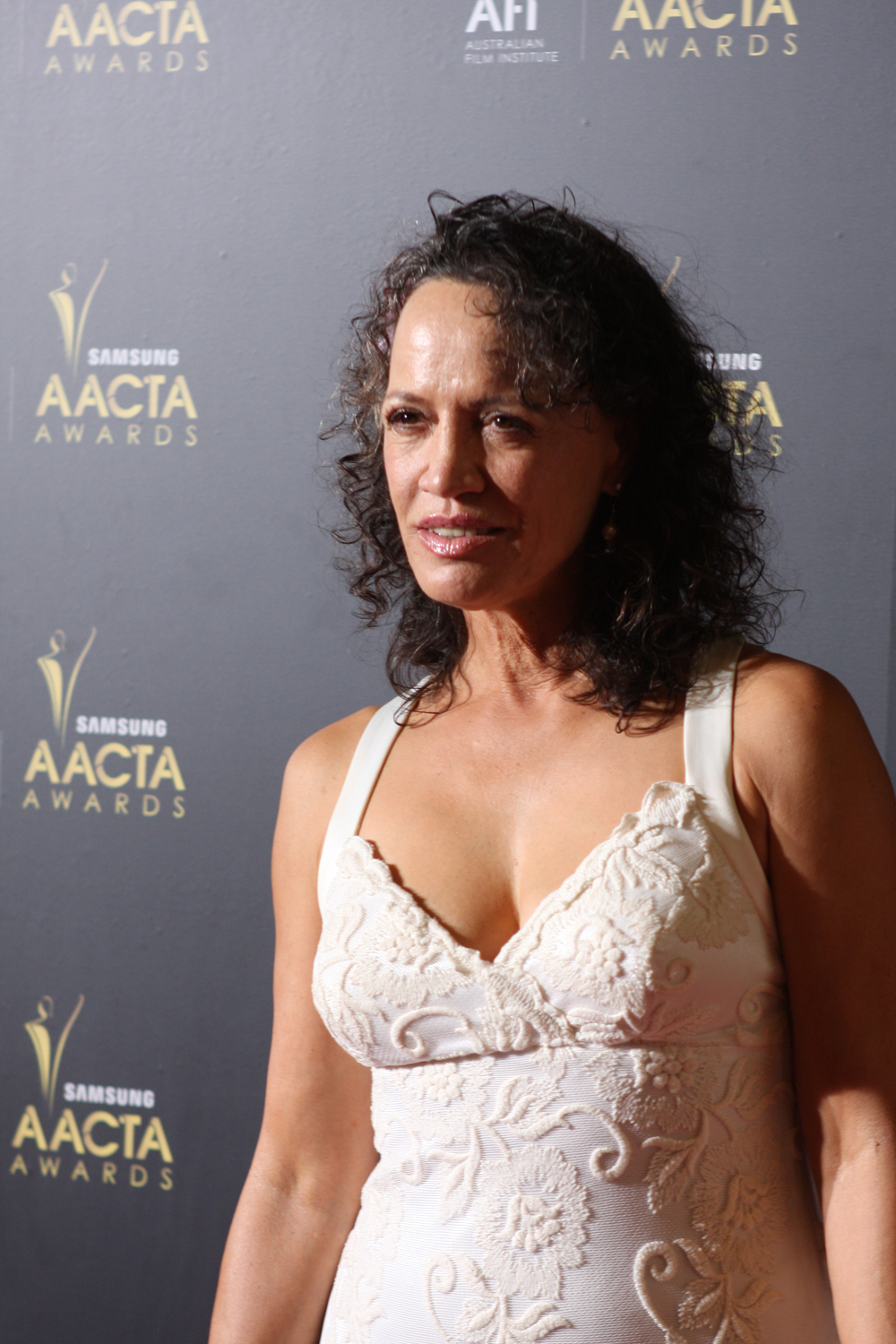
- Owen in 2012
- Born: Maria Makarena Owen; 22 July 1962 (age 64); Bay of Islands, New Zealand
- Occupations: Actress; writer; director; producer
- Years active: 1990–present

Maria Makarena Owen (born 22 July 1962), known professionally as Rena Owen, is a New Zealand actress in theatre, television and film. Owen is best known for her leading role as Beth Heke in Lee Tamahori's Once Were Warriors and as Taun We in George Lucas's Star Wars: Episode II – Attack of the Clones.

== Early life ==
Born in the New Zealand Bay of Islands, Owen is of Welsh, English, Irish, and Māori descent. One of nine children, she grew up in Moerewa, raised Catholic in a small rural town in the North Island's Bay of Islands. She regularly performed in local Māori culture groups and in dramas and musicals while in high school. Owen pursued a medical career and trained as a nurse at Auckland Hospital for three and a half years. Once she qualified as a registered nurse, Owen moved to London, United Kingdom.

== Career ==
Owen trained at the Actors Institute in London in the mid-1980s and worked extensively in British theatre. Highlights include Voices From Prison for the Royal Shakespeare Company, Co-Existences for the Elephant Theatre and Outside in for Theater New Zealand, which debuted at the Edinburgh Festival. Owen wrote and starred in Te Awa i Tahuti (The River That Ran Away), which had a successful London tour and was later published by NZ Playmarket in 1991.

Upon her return to New Zealand in 1989, Owen acted in two dramas for Television NZ's E Tipu E Rea series. A first of its kind, the series was written, acted, directed, and produced by Māori, telling Māori stories. She worked extensively in theatre; acting, writing, directing, working as a dramaturge, and was a founding member of Taki Rua Theatre. Owen wrote and starred in Daddy's Girl, while also playing reoccurring roles in two TV series; Betty's Bunch & Shark in the Park. Recent theatre credits include starring in the classic NZ plays, Haruru Mai for the NZ International Arts Festival and The Pohutukawa Tree for ATC. In the USA, she has acted in multiple stage readings for Native Voices at the Autry in LA, and a charity stage reading of Vagina Monologues for the City of West Hollywood. She also played the lead in a Hawaiian play called Fine Dancing, adapted and directed Toa Fraser's play Bare for the Asian American Theatre Company in San Francisco (AATC).

In Once Were Warriors, Owen portrayed the leading role of Beth Heke alongside Temuera Morrison, who played her husband. Once Were Warriors is predominantly narrated from Beth's perspective, and her performance was praised as "classic". Owen reprised the role in the film's sequel, What Becomes of the Broken Hearted? (1999).

Owen portrayed Taun We in George Lucas' Star Wars: Episode II – Attack of the Clones, Nee Alavar in Star Wars: Episode III – Revenge of the Sith, and a cameo role in Steven Spielberg's A.I. Whilst playing a reoccurring role in WB's Angel, Owen played supporting and cameo roles in multiple international independent films. Highlights include the NZ Canadian co-production, Nemesis Game, Garth Maxwell's When Love Comes, Rolf de Heer's acclaimed Dance Me to My Song, Vincent Ward's acclaimed Rain of the Children, and US thrillers Alyce Kills & The Well. She played leading roles in the Australian TV drama series Medivac in 1998 and recently in ABC's The Straits, a multi-ethnic crime-family drama. She also appeared in A&E's Longmire.

In 2011, as part of the 2011 Rugby World Cup, Owen took part in a televised concert called Mika's Aroha Mardi Gras. Owen played the part of the story teller at the event, hosting 15,000 people in the outdoor event which featured two concerts.

In 2014, Owen and Morrison completed work on a documentary celebrating the 20-year anniversary of Once Were Warriors.

In 2016, Owen was cast in the Freeform thriller series Siren as Helen, which was premiered on March 29, 2018.

=== Star Wars ===
Owen portrayed Taun We in Star Wars: Episode II – Attack of the Clones (2002) (in which Temuera Morrison played Jango Fett) and returned in Star Wars: Episode III – Revenge of the Sith (2005) as Nee Alavar. She also worked with the Star Wars Expanded Universe when she reprised her role as Taun We in the video game Star Wars: Republic Commando. In 2021, Owen reprised her role as Taun We in Star Wars: The Bad Batch.

== Awards ==
Her role in Once Were Warriors earned Owen rave reviews and multiple international awards including Best Actress at the Montreal World Film Festival, Oporto Film Festival, San Diego International Film Festival, and the Cannes Film Festival Spirit Award. In New Zealand, she was awarded a Special Benny Award for Excellence in Film, and the Toastmasters Communicator of the Year Award.

Further acting accolades include a Best Supporting Actress nomination for her role in the 1997 New Zealand TV Series, Coverstory and an AFI Best Supporting Actress nomination in 1998 for her role in Rolf de Heer's film, Dance Me to My Song. She won the Best Supporting Actress Award at the 2012 Aotearoa Film and Television Awards (AFTA) for her role as Hine Ryan in the New Zealand soap opera Shortland Street. She was nominated for Best Supporting Actress for her recurring role as Mere Hahunga in the award-winning Australian TV series, East West 101, at the Australian Academy of Cinema and Television Arts, and nominated for Best Actress at the Montecarlo International Television Festival.

- Australian Academy of Cinema and Television Arts Award nomination (2012): Best Guest or Supporting Actress in a Television Drama- East West 101
- New Zealand Film and TV Awards Winner (2011): Best Supporting Actress- Shortland Street
- Film Critics Circle of Australia Awards Nomination (1999): Best Supporting Actress- Dance Me to My Song
- Australian Film Institute Awards Nomination (1998): Best Performance by an Actress in a Supporting Role- Dance Me to My Song
- NZ Film & TV Awards nomination (1997): Best Supporting Actress- Cover Story
- Chicago Film Critics Association Award for Best Actress (1994): Once Were Warriors
- Montreal World Film Festival Winner (1994): Best Actress- Once Were Warriors
- San Diego International Film Festival (1994): Best Actress- Once Were Warriors
- New Zealand Māori Queen, Dame Te Atairangikaahu Literary Award, 1992

== Filmography ==
=== Film ===
Year	Title	Role	Notes
1994	Hinekaro Goes on a Picnic and Blows Up Another Obelisk	Hinekaro	Short
1994	Rapa Nui	Hitirenga	
1994	Once Were Warriors	Beth Heke	
1995	The Call Up	Emily Broughton	
1995	Savage Play	Takiora	
1998	Dance Me to My Song	Rix	
1998	When Love Comes Along	Katie	
1999	I'll Make You Happy	Mickie	
1999	What Becomes of the Broken Hearted?	Beth Heke	
1999	9 Across		Short
2000	Her Iliad	Lena	
2001	A.I. Artificial Intelligence	Ticket Taker	
2001	Soul Assassin	Karina	
2002	Star Wars: Episode II – Attack of the Clones	Taun We (voice)	
2002	sIDney	Clarissa	Short
2003	Red Zone	Mac's Mom	
2003	Nemesis Game	Emily Gray	
2004	The Land Has Eyes	Warrior Woman	
2005	Star Wars: Episode III – Revenge of the Sith	Nee Alavar	
2005	The Crow: Wicked Prayer	Mary	
2005	Mee-Shee: The Water Giant	'Crazy' Norma	
2005	Freezerburn	Lee	
2006	Leela	Mother	Short
2006	The Horrible Flowers	Linda	
2006	The Iron Man	Dolores	
2008	Ocean of Pearls	Anna Berisha	
2008	A Beautiful Life	Sam	
2008	Amusement	Psychiatrist	
2008	Finding Red Cloud	Barfly	
2009	Veronika Decides to Die	Nurse Josephine	
2009	Prison Break: The Final Break	Shu C.O.	Video
2009	Spout	Oma	Short
2011	Alyce Kills	Danielle	
2011	Absolute Killers	Judge Irwin	
2014	The Last Survivors	Claire	
2014	The Dead Lands	Grandmother	
2015	The Last Witch Hunter	Glaeser	
2016	Lost Girls	Cop	Short
2017	Asomatous	Mordeya	
2022	Whina	Older Whina Cooper	
2024	A Mistake	Tessa	
2026	Moana	Gramma Tala	
TBA	The Exquisite Continent	Narrator	Documentary

=== Television ===
Year	Title	Role	Notes
1990	Betty's Bunch	Shirley Gardner	
1990–91	Shark in the Park	Ngaire	Recurring role
1995	High Tide	Kara Gibson	Episode: "Regarding Joey"
1996	Cover Story	Mairanga	Episode: "The Cult"
1996	G.P.	Hilary Harper	Episode: "Fire and Water"
1996–1998	Medivac	Macy Fields	Main role
2000	All-American Girl: The Mary Kay Letourneau Story	Soona Fualau	TV film
2000	Dark Knight	Rock Witch	"Golden Bird"
2001	Gideon's Crossing	Tara	"Flashpoint"
2002	Angel	Dinza	"Ground State"
2009	Piece of My Heart	Kat	TV film
2009	Prison Break	SHU C.O.	"Free"
2009	Fear Clinic	Brett's Mom	Episode: "Hydrophobia"
2009–2011	East West 101	Mere Hahunga	Episodes: "Ice in the Veins", "The Price of Salvation"
2011	Shortland Street	Hine Ryan	Recurring role
2011	Mika's Aroha Mardi Gras	Herself (Story Teller)	TV special
2012	The Straits	Kitty Montebello	Main role
2014–15	Longmire	Medicine Woman	Episodes: "Counting Coup", "The Calling Back"
2015	The Red Road	Medicine Woman	"Graves"
2016	Joy	Kaylee	Episode: "California Soul
2017–2022	The Orville	Heveena	Recurring role (Episodes: "About A Girl", "Sanctuary", "A Tale of Two Topas", “Midnight Blue”)
2018–2020	Siren	Helen Hawkins	Main role
2020	The Gloaming	Grace Cochran	TV series
2021	Star Wars: The Bad Batch	Taun We	Voice; Episode: "Bounty Lost"
2022	Super Giant Robot Brothers	Sarge	Voice; Episode: "Upgrades"

=== Video games ===
Year	Title	Role	Notes
2005	Star Wars: Republic Commando	Taun We (voice)	

== Theatre ==
- Lead Role: Pohutukawa Tree, Auckland Theatre Company, New Zealand (2009)
