= Once Were Warriors (film) =

1994 New Zealand film by Lee Tamahori

- Theatrical release poster
- Directed by: Lee Tamahori
- Written by: Riwia Brown
- Based on: Once Were Warriors by Alan Duff
- Produced by: Robin Scholes
- Starring: Rena Owen; Temuera Morrison; Cliff Curtis; Julian Arahanga; Mamaengaroa Kerr-Bell
- Cinematography: Stuart Dryburgh
- Edited by: Michael J. Horton
- Music by: Murray Grindlay; Murray McNabb
- Distributed by: Footprint Films
- Release dates: May 1994 (New Zealand); 3 May 1995 (United States)
- Running time: 102 minutes
- Country: New Zealand
- Languages: English; Māori
- Box office: NZ$6.7 million

Once Were Warriors is a 1994 New Zealand tragedy film based on New Zealand author Alan Duff's bestselling 1990 first novel of the same name. The film tells the story of the Heke family, an urban Māori whānau living in South Auckland, and their problems with poverty, tobacco, gambling, drugs, alcoholism, and domestic violence, mostly brought on by the patriarch, Jake. It explores the detrimental effects of the colonisation of New Zealand suffered by Māori, and the survival of Māori culture against all odds.

The film was directed by Lee Tamahori, written by Riwia Brown, and stars Rena Owen, Temuera Morrison and Cliff Curtis. It became the highest-grossing film of all time in New Zealand, and has won numerous awards.

== Plot ==
A woman named Beth leaves her small Māori village and, despite her parents' objections, marries the violent and domineering Jake "The Muss" Heke. Now, eighteen years later, they live with their five children in an unkempt state house in South Auckland.

Jake is laid off from his job but shows little interest in finding new work. He receives the unemployment benefit and spends most days drinking at a nearby pub with friends and getting into bar fights. He often brings groups from the pub back to the family home for parties, during which he is physically violent toward Beth. He eventually assaults her in front of the guests, who do not intervene. Beth in turn also begins drinking heavily and displays occasional outbursts towards her children. Their children are left to look after themselves and clean up the house following incidents of domestic violence.

Nig, the eldest son of the Heke family, moves out to join a gang whose rituals include getting facial tattoos. He undergoes an initiation beating, passes and is then embraced as a new brother. Nig cares about his siblings and is angered when his mother is beaten but does not intervene. Nig's younger brother Mark, aka "Boogie", is placed in a foster home as a ward of the state due to his parents' home life. Jake is unconcerned and hopes the experience will toughen him up. Despite his initial anger, Boogie finds a new niche for himself after the foster home's manager, Mr. Bennett, helps him embrace his Māori heritage. The family pools all their money to rent a car to visit Boogie. However, Jake stops at the pub and spends the day drinking, leaving the family waiting outside before they take a taxi home.

Grace, Jake and Beth’s 13-year-old daughter, keeps a journal of events and stories for her younger siblings. Her best friend is Toot, a homeless boy living in a wrecked car. She fears an inevitable future of marriage, which she associates with serving a husband and enduring abuse, and dreams of living independently. Grace is raped by Uncle Bully, a friend of her father, and falls into a deep depression. Grace seeks support from Toot, with whom she smokes marijuana for the first time, but when Toot tries to kiss her she reacts violently and storms out, believing he is "just like the rest of them". Confused, Grace eventually goes home to an angry Jake with his friends. Bully asks for a goodnight kiss to test his power over her. She refuses and Jake sees it as a sign of disrespect, so he rips her journal in two and nearly beats her. Beth returns home from searching for Grace, and then wails and screams hysterically after finding her daughter has hanged herself from a tree branch in the backyard.

Jake deals with the tragedy by going to the pub while the rest of his family takes Grace's body to a tangihanga. Beth stands up to him for the first time when he refuses to let her be taken to the marae. The family mourns on the marae while Jake drinks. Boogie impresses Beth with his Māori singing at the funeral, and Toot says his goodbyes, telling Grace the gentle kiss he gave her the last time he saw her was a gesture meant only to confirm their mantra 'best friends for life'. Boogie reassures Toot that Grace loved him, and Beth invites him to live with them.

Reading Grace's diary later that night, Beth finds out about the rape and confronts Bully at the pub. Jake initially threatens Beth for accusing his friend, but Nig steps between them, protecting his mother, and tells Jake to look at the diary for himself. This realisation sends Jake into a blind rage, as he beats Bully to near-death. Beth, blaming Jake just as much as Bully because of his violent lifestyle, decides to take their children back to her Māori village and traditions, defiantly telling him that her heritage gives her the strength to resist his control over her. Jake shouts at her on a kerb outside the pub as the family leaves, before collapsing to the ground in defeat, with police sirens wailing in the background.

== Cast ==
- Rena Owen as Beth Heke
- Temuera Morrison as Jake "the Muss" Heke
- Julian Arahanga as Nig Heke
- Mamaengaroa Kerr-Bell as Grace Heke
- Taungaroa Emile as Mark "Boogie" Heke
- Rachael Morris Jr. as Polly Heke
- Joseph Kairau as Huata Heke
- George Henare as Mr. Bennett
- Cliff Curtis as Uncle Bully
- Pete Smith as Dooley
- Calvin Tuteao as Taka
- Shannon Williams as Toot
- Mere Boynton as Mavis

== Production ==
Once Were Warriors is the first feature film produced by Communicado Productions. The production won Best Film at the Durban International Film Festival, Montreal World Film Festival, New Zealand Film & Television Awards, and Rotterdam Film Festival. It also became at the time the highest-grossing film in New Zealand, surpassing The Piano (1993). Once Were Warriors was nominated for the Grand Prix of the Belgian Syndicate of Cinema Critics.

The film was shot at a local state house, located at 33 O'Connor Street, Ōtara, in the Auckland metropolitan area. The neighbours of the house used for filming complained on numerous occasions due to the film's late night party scenes.

== Release ==
The film opened at 4 theatres in Auckland and Hamilton, New Zealand in May 1994.

== Reception ==
=== Critical reception ===
Once Were Warriors was critically lauded on release. On the review aggregator website Rotten Tomatoes, 93% of 46 critics' reviews are positive, with an average rating of 7.9/10. The website's consensus reads: "Once Were Warriors isn't an easy watch, but the raw power of its story -- and the performances of an excellent cast -- reward viewers who rise to the challenge." On Metacritic the film has a score of 77% based on reviews from 20 critics, indicating "generally favorable reviews".

Roger Ebert gave the film three and a half stars out of four and observed: "Once Were Warriors has been praised as an attack on domestic violence and abuse. So it is. But I am not sure anyone needs to see this film to discover that such brutality is bad. We know that. I value it for two other reasons: its perception in showing the way alcohol triggers sudden personality shifts, and its power in presenting two great performances by Morrison and Owen. You don't often see acting like this in the movies. They bring the Academy Awards into perspective."

In The Movie Show review of 1994, Margaret Pomeranz called Once Were Warriors "a very impressive big screen debut from director Lee Tamahori," while also praising the cinematography of Stuart Dryburgh and the performances of the films leads, Morrison and Owen. Co-host David Stratton described the film as "astonishing," "absolutely devastating," and "a really, really, really good film." Stratton also compared Once Were Warriors favourably with New Zealand's Heavenly Creatures of the same year. Pomeranz gave Once Were Warriors four stars out of five while Stratton gave it four point five.

A 2014 New Zealand survey voted Once Were Warriors the best New Zealand film of all time.

=== Box office ===
The film grossed $114,000 in its opening from 4 New Zealand cinemas, breaking records. It became the highest-grossing film ever released in New Zealand with a gross of NZ$6.7 million, surpassing Jurassic Park.

== Year-end lists ==
- Honorable mention – Glenn Lovell, San Jose Mercury News

== Sequels ==
- A sequel to the film, What Becomes of the Broken Hearted?, was produced in 1999, based on the 1996 novel of the same name. It was also a critical and box office success, but somewhat lesser than the original film.
- The third and final book in the trilogy, Jake's Long Shadow (2002), has not been made into a movie.

== In other media ==
Once Were the Cast of Warriors (2014) is a documentary film made for the 20th anniversary of the original release of Once Were Warriors.
