= List of roles and awards of Catherine Zeta-Jones =

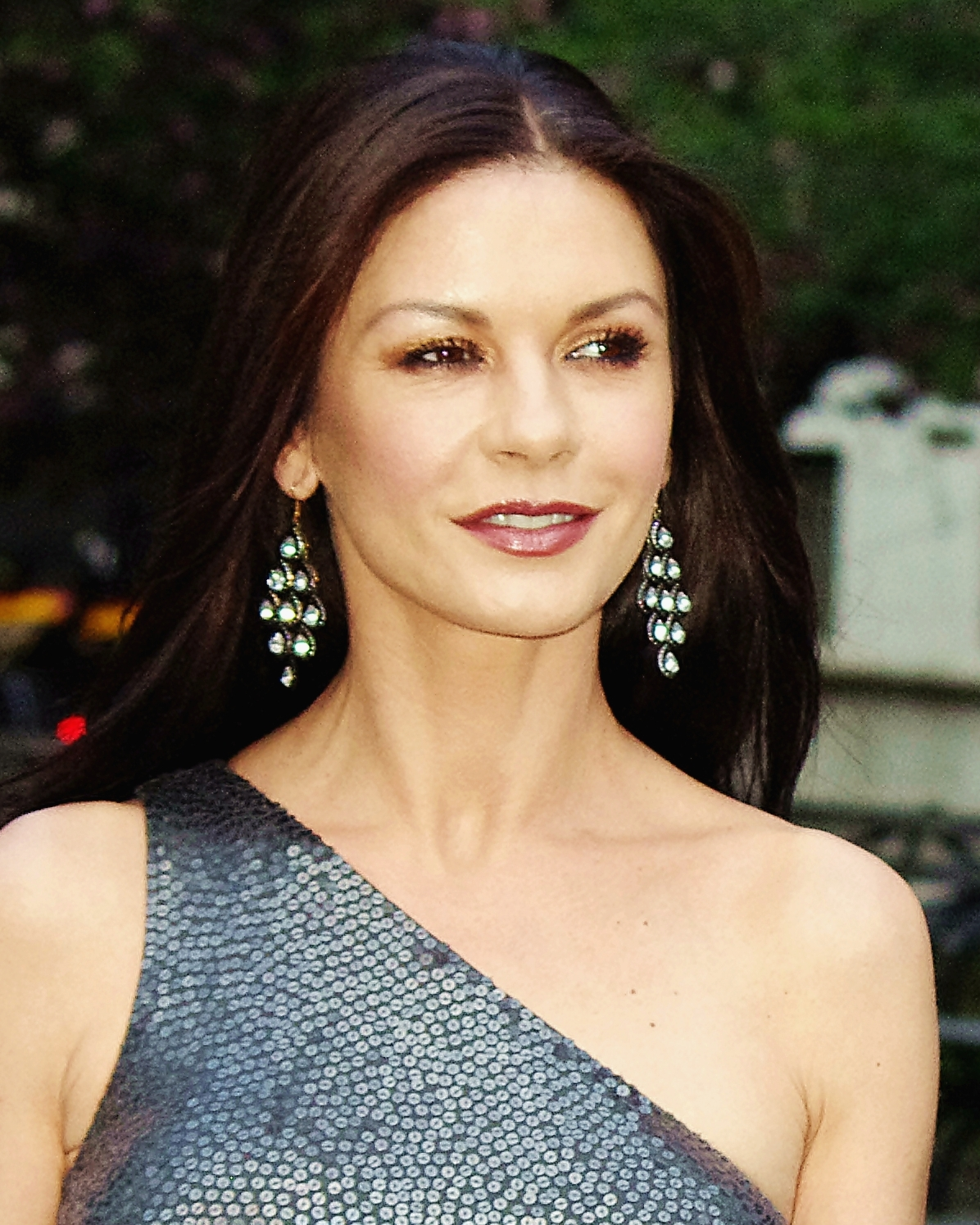
Zeta-Jones in 2012

Catherine Zeta-Jones is a Welsh actress. Her first stage appearance was at age nine as one of the orphan girls in a West End production of the musical Annie. She also played the title role in another production of the musical at the Swansea Grand Theatre in 1981. As a teenager, she played roles in the West End productions of Bugsy Malone and The Pajama Game, following which she had her stage breakthrough with the lead role of a chorus girl turned star in a 1987 production of 42nd Street.

The French-Italian fantasy feature 1001 Nights (1990) marked Zeta-Jones' film debut. She gained popularity in Britain with the role of a country girl in the television series The Darling Buds of May (1991–93)—the most watched series in the country at that time. However, disillusioned at only being offered roles of the love interest, Zeta-Jones shifted base to Los Angeles. She achieved early success by playing roles that relied significantly on her sex appeal, in the action film The Mask of Zorro (1998) and the caper thriller Entrapment (1999). The former earned her a Saturn Award for Best Actress nomination.

Zeta-Jones' portrayal of a drug lord's wife in Steven Soderbergh's Traffic (2000) gained her a Golden Globe Award for Best Supporting Actress nomination. She then won an Academy Award and a BAFTA Award for Best Supporting Actress for playing Velma Kelly in the musical Chicago (2002). As the highest-paid British actresses in Hollywood at the time, she took on the parts of a serial divorcée in Intolerable Cruelty (2003), a flight attendant in The Terminal (2004) and a Europol agent in Ocean's Twelve (2004). A sequel to The Mask of Zorro, entitled The Legend of Zorro (2005), was a failure, following which Zeta-Jones played an ambitious chef in the romantic comedy No Reservations (2007).

Zeta-Jones significantly decreased her workload in the late 2000s. She made her Broadway debut in 2009 with the role of an aging actress in the musical A Little Night Music, which won her the Tony Award for Best Actress. After a three-year absence from the screen, she had three film releases each in 2012 and 2013. None of her releases in 2012 performed well. This changed in 2013, when she played a mysterious psychiatrist in Soderbergh's critically acclaimed thriller Side Effects and a Russian agent in the action film Red 2. After another three-year sabbatical, Zeta-Jones starred in the British film Dad's Army (2016), based on the television sitcom of the same name. In 2017, she returned to television by portraying the actress Olivia de Havilland in the anthology series Feud. She has since appeared in the television series Prodigal Son (2021) and Wednesday (2022).

== Screen credits ==
=== Film ===
Key
†	Denotes films that have not yet been released

Year (Note: Refers to the film's earliest release)	Title	Role	Notes	Ref(s)
1990	1001 Nights	Scheherazade	French language film	
1992	Christopher Columbus: The Discovery	Beatriz Enríquez de Arana		
1993	Splitting Heirs	Kitty Farrant		
1995	Blue Juice	Chloe		
1996	The Phantom	Sala		
1998	The Mask of Zorro	Elena Montero		
1999	Entrapment	Virginia "Gin" Baker		
1999	The Haunting	Theodora		
2000	High Fidelity	Charlie Nicholson		
2000	Traffic	Helena Ayala		
2001	America's Sweethearts	Gwen Harrison		
2002	Chicago	Velma Kelly		
2003	Sinbad: Legend of the Seven Seas	Marina (voice)		
2003	Intolerable Cruelty	Marilyn Rexroth		
2004	The Terminal	Amelia Warren		
2004	Ocean's Twelve	Isabel Lahiri		
2005	The Legend of Zorro	Elena De La Vega		
2007	No Reservations	Kate Armstrong		
2007	Death Defying Acts	Mary McGarvie		
2009	The Rebound	Sandy		
2012	Lay the Favorite	Tulip Heimowitz		
2012	Rock of Ages	Patricia Whitmore		
2012	Playing for Keeps	Denise		
2013	Broken City	Cathleen Hostetler		
2013	Side Effects	Dr. Victoria Siebert		
2013	Red 2	Katja Petrokovich		
2016	Dad's Army	Rose Winters		
2026	The Gallerist	Marianne Gorman		
TBA	Cupid †	TBA	Filming	

=== Television ===
Year	Title	Role	Notes	Ref(s)
1991	The Play on One	Chirsty	Episode: "Out of the Blue"	
1991–1993	The Darling Buds of May	Mariette	Main role	
1992	The Young Indiana Jones Chronicles	Maya	Episode: "Palestine, October 1917"	
1994	The Return of the Native	Eustacia Vye	Movie	
1994	The Cinder Path	Victoria Chapman	Miniseries	
1995	Catherine the Great	Catherine II	Movie	
1996	Titanic	Isabella Paradine	Miniseries	
2017	Feud: Bette and Joan	Olivia de Havilland	6 episodes	
2018	Cocaine Godmother	Griselda Blanco	Movie	
2018–2019	Queen America	Vicki Ellis	Main role	
2021	Prodigal Son	Dr. Vivian Capshaw	7 episodes (season 2)	
2022–present	Wednesday	Morticia Addams	Main cast (season 2), guest (season 1)	
2022–2023	National Treasure: Edge of History	Billie Pearce	Main cast	
2026	Kill Jackie	Jackie Price	Also executive producer	

== Stage roles ==
Year	Production	Role	Theater	Ref(s)
1981 (Note: The musical was staged from 1978 to 1981, but the dates when Zeta-Jones performed is unknown.)	Annie	Orphan girl	Victoria Palace Theatre	
1981	Annie	Annie	Swansea Grand Theatre	
1983	Bugsy Malone	Tallulah	Her Majesty's Theatre	
1985–86	The Pajama Game	Chorus girl	Haymarket Theatre, Leicester	
1987	42nd Street	Peggy Sawyer	Theatre Royal, Drury Lane	
1989	Street Scene	Mae Jones	London Coliseum	
1992	Under Milk Wood	Unknown	AIR Studios	
2009–10	A Little Night Music	Desirée Armfeldt	Walter Kerr Theatre	
2017	The Children's Monologues	Girl obsessed with math	Carnegie Hall	

== Awards and nominations ==
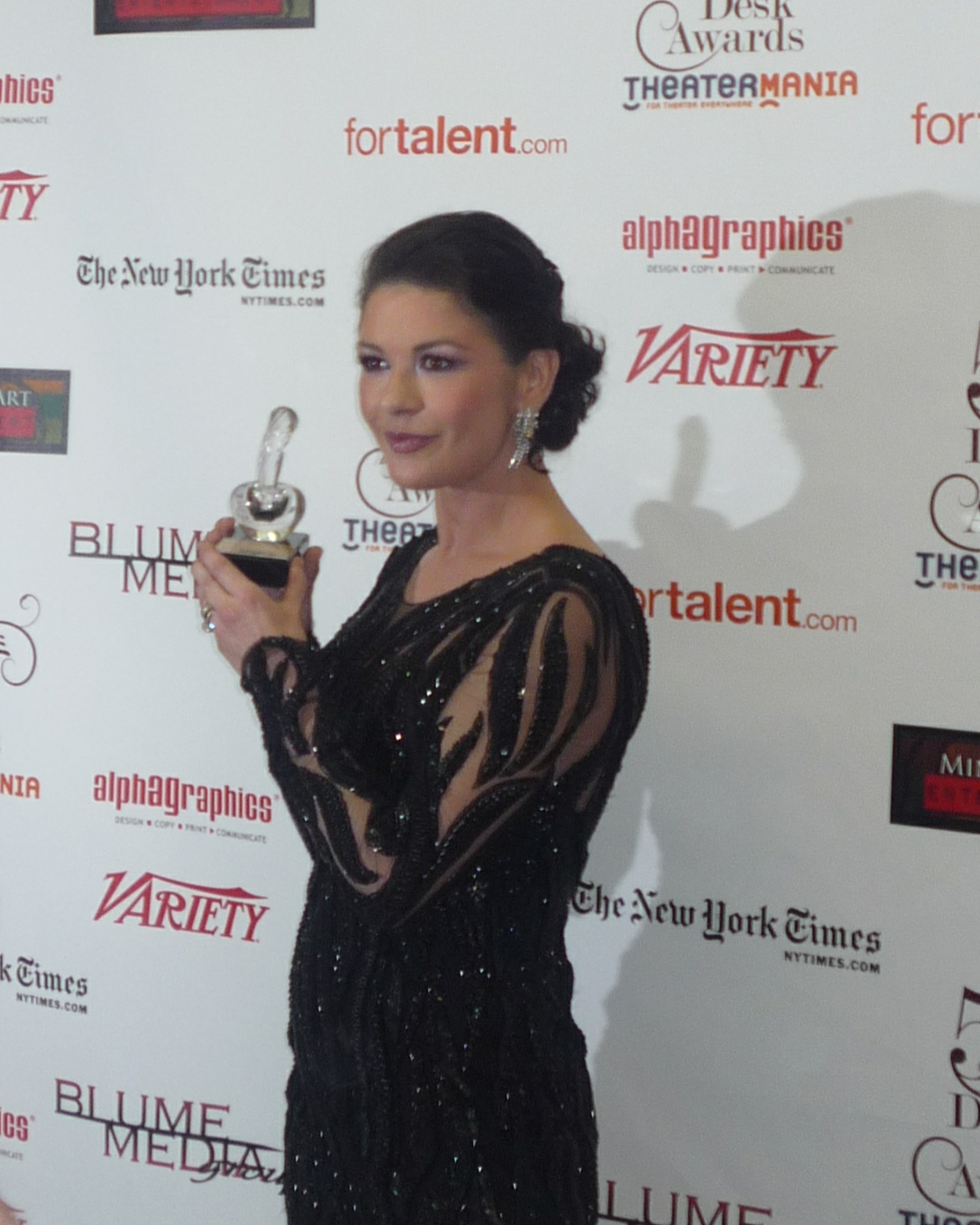
Zeta-Jones with the Drama Desk Award for Outstanding Actress in a Musical, which she won for A Little Night Music in 2010

Year (Note: Refers to the year in which the ceremony was held)	Association	Category	Film	Result	Ref.
1999	Blockbuster Entertainment Awards	Favorite Female Newcomer	The Mask of Zorro	Won	
1999	Saturn Awards	Best Actress	The Mask of Zorro	Nominated	
1999	MTV Movie Awards	Best Breakthrough Performance	The Mask of Zorro	Nominated	
1999	MTV Movie Awards	Best Fight (shared with Antonio Banderas)	The Mask of Zorro	Nominated	
1999	European Film Awards	Best Actress – People's Choice	Entrapment	Won	
2000	Golden Raspberry Awards	Worst Actress	Entrapment/ The Haunting	Nominated	
2000	Blockbuster Entertainment Awards	Favorite Actress – Action	Entrapment	Won	
2000	Blockbuster Entertainment Awards	Favorite Actress – Horror	The Haunting	Nominated	
2001	Screen Actors Guild	Outstanding Performance by a Cast in a Motion Picture	Traffic	Won	
2001	Golden Globe Awards	Best Supporting Actress – Motion Picture	Traffic	Nominated	
2001	Blockbuster Entertainment Awards	Favorite Supporting Actress – Drama	Traffic	Nominated	
2001	Chicago Film Critics Association	Best Supporting Actress	Traffic	Nominated	
2001	Dallas–Fort Worth Film Critics Association	Best Supporting Actress	Traffic	Nominated	
2002	Empire Awards	Best British Actress	Traffic	Nominated	
2002	Boston Society of Film Critics	Best Supporting Actress	Chicago	Runner-up	
2003	Academy Awards	Best Supporting Actress	Chicago	Won	
2003	British Academy Film Awards	Best Actress in a Supporting Role	Chicago	Won	
2003	Critics' Choice Movie Awards	Best Acting Ensemble	Chicago	Won	
2003	Critics' Choice Movie Awards	Best Supporting Actress	Chicago	Won	
2003	Evening Standard British Film Awards	Best Actress	Chicago	Won	
2003	Screen Actors Guild	Outstanding Performance by a Cast in a Motion Picture	Chicago	Won	
2003	Screen Actors Guild	Outstanding Performance by a Female Actor in a Supporting Role	Chicago	Won	
2003	Dallas–Fort Worth Film Critics Association	Best Supporting Actress	Chicago	Nominated	
2003	Golden Globe Awards	Best Actress– Motion Picture Musical or Comedy	Chicago	Nominated	
2003	Online Film Critics Society	Best Supporting Actress	Chicago	Nominated	
2005	Critics' Choice Movie Awards	Best Acting Ensemble	Ocean's Twelve	Nominated	
2005	Hasty Pudding Theatricals	Woman of the Year	—	Won	
2006	People's Choice Awards	Favorite Female Action Star	The Legend of Zorro	Nominated	
2007	Alliance of Women Film Journalists	Actress Most in Need Of A New Agent	—	Nominated	
2010	Outer Critics Circle Awards	Outstanding Actress in a Musical	A Little Night Music	Won	
2010	Drama Desk Awards	Outstanding Actress in a Musical	A Little Night Music	Won	
2010	Tony Awards	Best Actress in a Musical	A Little Night Music	Won	
2017	National Film Awards UK	Global Contribution to Motion Picture	—	Nominated	
2019	Women's Image Awards	Actress Made For Television Movie / Mini-Series	Cocaine Godmother	Nominated	
2021	HCA TV Awards	Best Supporting Actress in a Broadcast Network or Cable Series, Drama	Prodigal Son	Nominated	
2023	Astra Creative Arts TV Awards	Best Guest Actress in a Comedy Series	Wednesday	Nominated	
2023	Children's and Family Emmy Awards	Outstanding Supporting Performance in a Preschool, Children's or Young Teen Program	National Treasure: Edge of History	Nominated	
2024	Saturn Awards	Best Guest Star in a Television Series	Wednesday	Nominated	
2026	Nickelodeon Kids' Choice Awards	Favorite Female TV Star (Family)	Wednesday	Pending	
