= Zawe Ashton =

British actress (born 1984)

Zawe Ashton FRSL
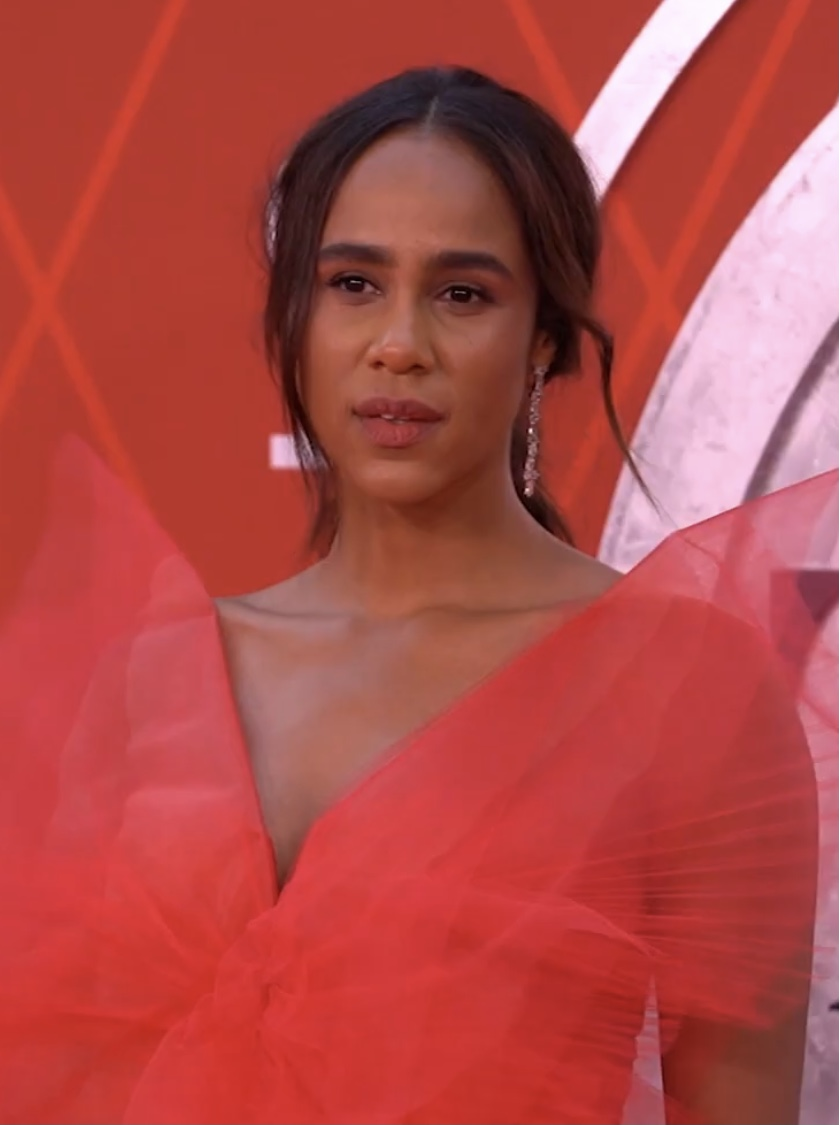
- Ashton at the 74th Tony Awards in October 2021
- Born: Zawedde Emma Ashton; 25 July 1984 (age 42); Hackney, London, England
- Occupations: Actress; playwright
- Years active: 1995 – present
- Partner(s): Tom Hiddleston (2019-present; Engaged)
- Children: 2
- Relatives: Paulo Muwanga (grandfather)

Zawedde Emma Muwanga-Ashton FRSL (/ˈzɑːwi/; born 25 July 1984) is a British actress and playwright. She gained recognition for her roles in the comedy dramas Fresh Meat and Not Safe for Work, the Netflix horror thriller film Velvet Buzzsaw, and for her portrayal of Joyce Carol Vincent in Dreams of a Life (2011). She also portrayed Dar-Benn in The Marvels (2023).

== Early life ==
Ashton was born in Hackney, London, on 25 July 1984. She is the eldest of three children born to a Ugandan mother, Victoria, and an English father, Paul Ashton. Her maternal grandfather, Paulo Muwanga, was President and later Prime Minister of Uganda.

She attended the Anna Scher Theatre School from the age of six, and was a member of the National Youth Theatre. She gained her degree in acting at Manchester Metropolitan University.

== Career ==
=== Acting ===
Ashton's theatre credits include Harold Pinter's Betrayal at The Harold Pinter Theatre, London and the Bernard B. Jacob's Theatre, Broadway. Rhinoceros, The Arsonists, Gone Too Far! (Royal Court), Othello (Globe Theatre), Frontline (Globe Theatre), All The Little Things We Crushed (Almeida), This Wide Night (Soho Theatre), Michael Frayn's comedy Here (The Rose Theatre Kingston), Abi Morgan’s Splendour (Donmar Warehouse), Jean Genet's The Maids (Trafalgar Studios), Salome in Salome (Headlong Theatre / Hampstead Theatre). In June 2010 Ashton was awarded 2nd prize at the Ian Charleson Awards for her classical performance in Salome.

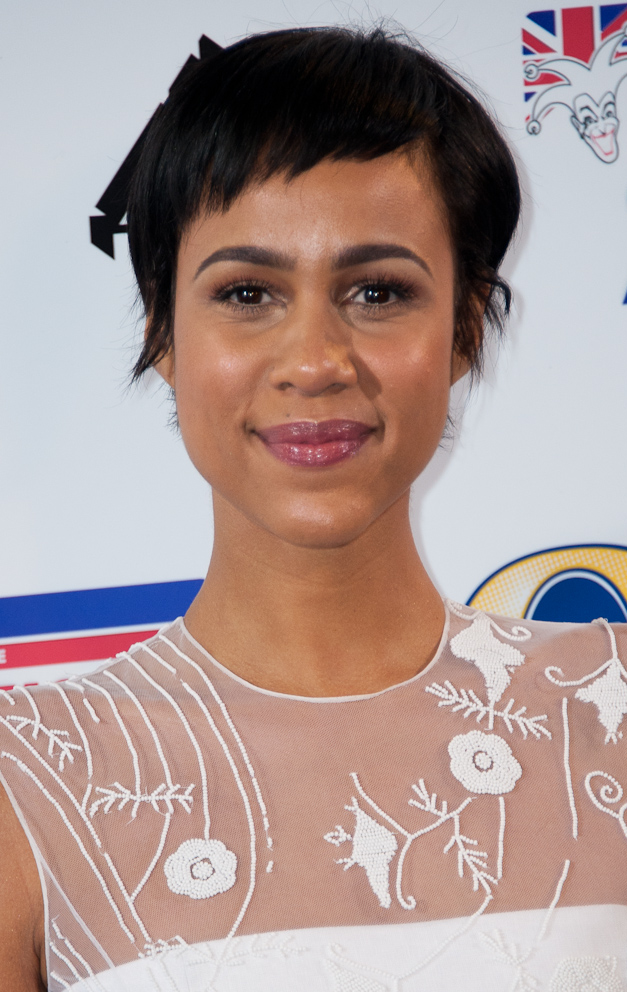
Ashton at the 2013 British Comedy Awards

Her film credits include Velvet Buzzsaw, directed by Dan Gilroy for Netflix, Dreams of a Life directed by Carol Morley, for which she was nominated in the Most Promising Newcomer category at the 2012 British Independent Film Awards, St. Trinian's 2: The Legend of Fritton's Gold, Blitz, Nocturnal Animals, directed by Tom Ford, Greta directed by Neil Jordan.

Her TV credits include Vod in the Channel 4 comedy Fresh Meat, Claire in the six-part BBC One / Netflix series Wanderlust, Journey Blue in Doctor Who, BBC, and Katherine in Not Safe For Work for Channel 4. As a child, Ashton appeared in two episodes of The Demon Headmaster.

In November 2023, she played the character Dar-Benn in the Marvel Studios movie The Marvels.

==== Awards ====
In May 2010, Ashton was named one of the "55 Faces of the Future" by Nylon magazine's Young Hollywood Issue. In October 2012, she received the Ultimate Newcomer trophy from Cosmopolitan magazine at their Women of the Year awards. In November 2012, she won the Creative Diversity Network Award for Best Breakthrough On-Screen Talent for her role as Vod in the BAFTA-nominated Channel 4 hit Fresh Meat. In 2013, she won a Screen Nation Award for Female Performance in a Film 2012/2013, in recognition of her lead-role performance in Dreams of a Life.

=== Writing ===
Ashton began entering poetry slams at age of 17, and won the London Poetry Slam Championship in 2000. In 2006 she was Young Writer in Residence at the Contact Theatre in Manchester. Her first play, Harm's Way, was shortlisted for the Verity Bargate Award in 2007, and premiered at the Lowry, Salford in 2008 as part of the National Youth Theatre’s new writing season. Her other plays include Skunk, performed by the National Youth Theatre and Soho Theatre; and She from the Sea, performed in 2010 at the London International Festival of Theatre (LIFT). Ashton was co-writer of Suddenlossofdignity.com, Bush Futures Programme. One of her plays, For all the Women Who Thought They Were Mad, was selected as part of the Royal Court Playwriting Festival in 2009. She contributed to the writing of The Children's Monologues, adapted from over 300 original stories by Tswana, Zulu and Sesotho children in South Africa and presented by Dramatic Need in 2010. She has worked with the Bush Theatre and the Clean Break theatre company.

In 2019, Ashton published her first book, Character Breakdown, a fictionalized memoir based on her experiences as an actress.

She was elected a Fellow of the Royal Society of Literature in July 2021.

=== Other work ===
Ashton has narrated episodes of 24 Hours in Police Custody, shown on Channel 4. She narrated a documentary, Public Enemies: Jay-Z vs Kanye, for the same channel in 2017.

In 2017, Ashton presented the third series of Random Acts, Channel 4's short-film showcase in association with Arts Council England. Episode 2 included a film directed by Ashton, where she had the lead role.

== Personal life ==
Ashton has been in a relationship with English actor Tom Hiddleston since 2019, after playing a married couple in the West End and Broadway revivals of Harold Pinter's play Betrayal. The couple made their first public appearance together at the 2021 Tony Awards. Their engagement was confirmed in an LA Times interview with Hiddleston in June 2022.

They welcomed their first child in late 2022 and their second in 2025. Ashton and Hiddleston have not publicly announced a marriage, although Ashton has occasionally referred to Hiddleston as her husband, and Hiddleston has referred to Ashton as his wife.

== Acting credits ==
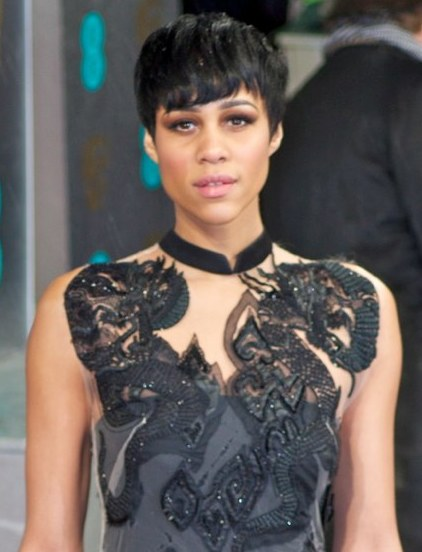
Ashton in 2013

=== Film ===
Year	Title	Role	Notes
2009	St. Trinian's II: The Legend of Fritton's Gold	Bianca	
2011	Blitz	WPC Elizabeth Falls	
2011	Weekender	Sarah	
2011	Dreams of a Life	Joyce Vincent	
2014	The Place We Go to Hide	—N/a	Director only; short film
2014	Happy Toys	—N/a	Director only; short film
2016	Nocturnal Animals	Alex	
2018	Greta	Alexa Hammond	
2019	Velvet Buzzsaw	Josephina	
2022	Mr. Malcolm's List	Julia Thistlewaite	
2023	The Marvels	Dar-Benn	
2024	All of You	Andrea	
2025	Broken English	The Media Archivist	Documentary

=== Television ===
Year	Title	Role	Notes
1995	Game On	Little Girl	Episode: "Bad Timing"
1996	The Demon Headmaster	Rebecca	2 episodes
2000	The Bill	Kylie	Episodes: "Meltdown: Part 2 & Part 3"
2002	In Deep	Jade	2 episodes
2003	Holby City	Abigail Meredith	Episode: "Crossing the Line"
2007	Mobile	Eyewitness	2 episodes
2008	The Bill	Becka Adams	Episode: "Gun Runner: Under Cover"
2009	Casualty	Gina	Episode: "True Lies"
2010	Sherlock	Sally Donovan	Episode: unaired pilot
2010	Misfits	Jessica	Episode: "#2.5"
2011	Lapland	Jingle Jill	Television film
2011–2013	Case Histories	Deborah Arnold	Main role
2011–2016	Fresh Meat	Violet "Vod" Nordstrom	Main role
2014	Doctor Who	Journey Blue	Episode: "Into the Dalek"
2014–2019	24 Hours in Police Custody	Narrator	Documentary series
2015	Not Safe For Work	Katherine	Main role
2017	Guerrilla	Omega	Miniseries
2017	Sarah & Duck	Hairdresser	Episode: "Hair Cut"
2018	Wanderlust	Claire Pascal	5 episodes
2021	The Handmaid's Tale	Oona	3 episodes
2021	Spice Girls: How Girl Power Changed Britain	Narrator	3 episodes
2022	Maryland	Mary	Television film
2023	Mog's Christmas	Mrs Gaynor (voice)	Animated television short film
2024	Paid in Full: The Battle for Black Music	Narrator	British broadcast only; original version narrated by Jully Black.

=== Theatre ===
Year	Title	Role	Venue	Notes	Ref.
2007	Othello	Bianca	The Globe		
2007	Rhinoceros	Daisy	Royal Court		
2007	The Arsonists	Anna	Royal Court		
2007	The Cage	Nicola	Nuffield Theatre		
2008	Gone Too Far!	Armani	Royal Court		
2008	The Front Line	Casey	The Globe		
2009	All The Little Things We Crushed	Zoe	Almeida Theatre		
2009	This Wide Night	Marie	Soho Theatre		
2010	Salome	Salome	Curve Theatre		
2010	The Children's Monologues	—N/a	The Old Vic / Royal Court Theatre	Writer only	
2012	Here	Cath	Rose Theatre		
2015	Splendour	Gilma	Donmar Warehouse		
2016	The Maids	Claire	Trafalgar Studios		
2018	The Hardest Rain	—N/a	The Old Vic	Writer only	
2019	For All the Women Who Thought They Were Mad	—N/a	Hackney Showroom / Soho Repertory Theatre	Writer only	
2019	Betrayal	Emma	Harold Pinter Theatre / Bernard B. Jacobs Theatre		
