= Catherine Zeta-Jones =

Welsh actress (born 1969)

Catherine Zeta-Jones CBE
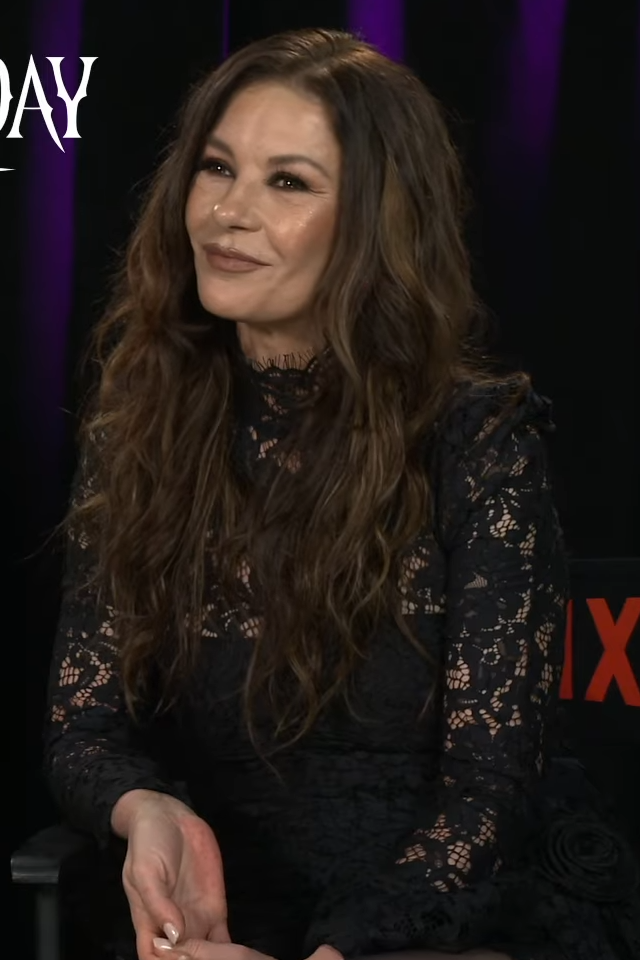
- Zeta-Jones in 2025
- Born: Catherine Zeta Jones; 25 September 1969 (age 57); Swansea, Wales
- Occupation: Actress
- Years active: 1981–present
- Works: Roles and awards
- Spouse: Michael Douglas (m. 2000)
- Children: 2
- Relatives: Robert Sullivan (cousin); Kirk Douglas (father-in-law); Cameron Douglas (stepson)
- Website: www.catherinezetajones.com

Signature
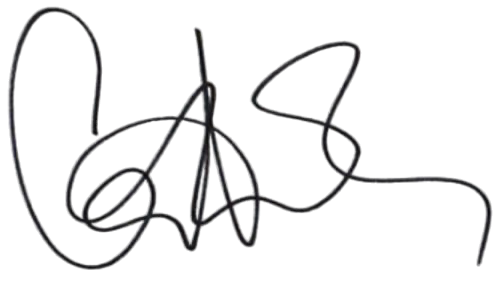

Catherine Zeta-Jones (/ˈziːtə/; born 25 September 1969) is a Welsh actress. She has received various accolades, including an Academy Award, a BAFTA Award, and a Tony Award. In 2010, she was appointed Commander of the Order of the British Empire (CBE) for her film and humanitarian work.

Born and raised in Swansea, Zeta-Jones aspired to be an actress from a young age. As a child, she played roles in the West End productions of the musicals Annie and Bugsy Malone. She studied musical theatre at the Arts Educational Schools, London, and made her stage breakthrough with a leading role in a 1987 production of 42nd Street. Her screen debut came in the unsuccessful French-Italian film 1001 Nights (1990), and went on to find greater success as a regular in the British television series The Darling Buds of May (1991–1993). Dismayed at being typecast as the token pretty girl in British films, Zeta-Jones relocated to Los Angeles. She established herself in Hollywood with roles that highlighted her sex appeal, such as in the action film The Mask of Zorro (1998) Entrapment (1999) and The Legend of Zorro (2005).

Zeta-Jones received critical acclaim for her performances as a vengeful pregnant woman in Traffic (2000) and Velma Kelly in the musical Chicago (2002), winning the Academy Award for Best Supporting Actress for the latter. She starred in high-profile films for much of the decade, including the black comedy Intolerable Cruelty (2003), the heist film Ocean's Twelve (2004), the comedy The Terminal (2004), and the romantic comedy No Reservations (2007). Parts in smaller-scale features were followed by a decrease in workload, during which she returned to the stage and played an aging actress in a Broadway production of A Little Night Music (2009), winning the Tony Award for Best Actress in a Musical. Zeta-Jones worked intermittently in the subsequent decades, starring in the films Side Effects (2013), Red 2 (2013), and Dad's Army (2016). She took on supporting roles in television, portraying Olivia de Havilland in Feud: Bette & Joan (2017) and Morticia Addams in Wednesday (2022–present).

Aside from acting, Zeta-Jones is a brand endorser and supports various charitable causes. Her experience with depression and bipolar II disorder has been well documented by the media. She is married to actor Michael Douglas, with whom she has two children.

== Early life and initial stage career ==
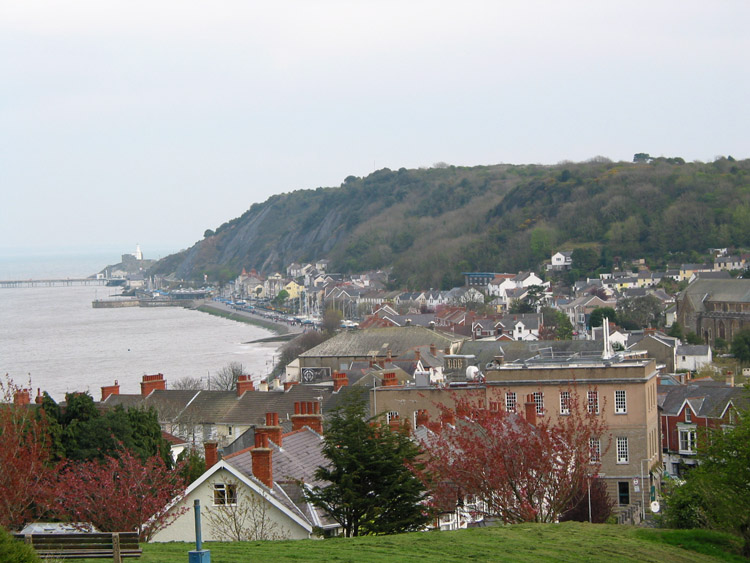
The Mumbles district of Swansea, where Zeta-Jones was raised

She was born Catherine Zeta Jones (Note: The name on her birth certificate is Catherine Zeta Jones, i.e. without the hyphen, Jones being her surname and Zeta her middle name.) on 25 September 1969 in Swansea, Wales, to a Welsh father, David Jones, the owner of a sweet factory, and his wife Patricia (née Fair), a seamstress, who was of Irish Catholic descent. She was named after her grandmothers, Catherine Fair and Zeta Jones; Zeta was the name of a ship that her great-grandfather had sailed on. She has an older brother, David, and a younger brother, Lyndon, who worked as a sales representative before venturing into film production. She was born and raised in the Treboeth area of Swansea before moving to the Mumbles area of the city after her parents' bingo win of £100,000. Because Zeta-Jones was a hyperactive child, her mother sent her to the Hazel Johnson School of Dance when she was four years old. She was educated at Dumbarton House School, a private school in Swansea. The family came from a modest background, but their fortunes improved with their bingo win, thus enabling them to pay for their daughter's dance and ballet lessons.

Zeta-Jones participated in school stage shows from a young age and gained local media attention when her rendition of a Shirley Bassey song won a Junior Star Trail talent competition. As part of a dance troupe, she routinely took trips to London, where she auditioned for roles in the theatre. At age nine, Zeta-Jones was selected to play July, one of the orphan girls in the original West End production of the musical Annie, and in her early teens, she became a national tap-dancing champion. In 1981, she played the lead role of Annie in a Swansea production of the musical, which was staged at the Swansea Grand Theatre. Two years later, she played the lead role of Tallulah in a West End production of Bugsy Malone. When she was fifteen, Zeta-Jones left school without obtaining O-levels and decided to live in London to pursue a full-time acting career. Describing her teenage years in London, Zeta-Jones said, "I would queue up for auditions and then change my costume or put on a different leotard and audition again. It might take me two tries, but I always got the job. I figured out what they wanted". She went on to attend the independent Arts Educational Schools in the Chiswick district of London, for a three-year course in musical theatre.

From November 1985 to January 1986, she performed as a company member in a production of The Pajama Game at the Haymarket Theatre, Leicester. In 1987, seventeen-year-old Zeta-Jones was picked as the second understudy for the lead actress in a West End production of 42nd Street. During one of the performances, both the star and the first understudy were unavailable, and Zeta-Jones was asked to play the role of Peggy Sawyer—a chorus girl who becomes a star. The producer was impressed by her acting ability and allowed her to play the part for the following two years. Her next stage appearance was with the English National Opera at the London Coliseum in 1989 where she played Mae Jones in Kurt Weill's Street Scene.

== Career ==
=== 1990–1996: Screen debut and career struggles ===
In 1990, Zeta-Jones made her film debut in the director Philippe de Broca's film 1001 Nights. An adaptation of the Arabic fable One Thousand and One Nights, the French-Italian production recounts the tale from the perspective of Scheherazade (Zeta-Jones), one of the brides of King Sharir (Thierry Lhermitte). 1001 Nights did not perform well at the box office, and according to de Broca's obituary in The Daily Telegraph, the film "is best remembered for its enjoyable nude scenes." Greater success followed when she starred opposite David Jason and Pam Ferris in the ITV period comedy-drama television series The Darling Buds of May from 1991 to 1993. Adapted from H. E. Bates' novel of the same name, Zeta-Jones played the role of the eldest daughter of a family living in the countryside in 1950s Britain. The series was the highest-rated television show in the country at the time, and Zeta-Jones gained wide public recognition for it. "Literally, with one hour of television my life completely changed. I couldn't go anywhere", she remarked.

Following a brief appearance as Beatriz Enríquez de Arana in the unsuccessful adventure film Christopher Columbus: The Discovery (1992), Zeta-Jones featured as a belly dancer in disguise in a 1992 episode of George Lucas' television series The Young Indiana Jones Chronicles. She next took on the part of an aspiring duchess in Splitting Heirs (1993), a farcical period drama from the director Robert Young about two children (Eric Idle and Rick Moranis) who are separated at birth. Reviews of the film were negative, though the critic Vincent Canby of The New York Times found her to be "very funny". In 1994, Zeta-Jones played the melancholic Eustacia Vye in the television film The Return of the Native, an adaptation of the 1878 novel of the same name by Thomas Hardy, and the wife of Lloyd Owen's character in the television war drama The Cinder Path. She was then cast as the eponymous protagonist of the 1995 television biopic Catherine the Great. In a mixed review, critic Lisa Nesselson of Variety found the miniseries to be "brightly colo[u]red" but "wooden and hollow", though thought that Zeta-Jones "imparts a certain grace and resolve to her sovereign-in-the-making". She next appeared as the pragmatic girlfriend of Sean Pertwee's character in Blue Juice (1995), publicised as Britain's first surf film, which the critic Leonard Maltin dismissed as a "superficial and predictable" production.

Dismayed at being typecast as the token pretty girl in British films, Zeta-Jones relocated to Los Angeles, stating: "There was all this fuss about who I was and wasn't dating. I was a pretty face and a big bust and nothing else. People in the business believed what they read about me. So I decided to move away and start again." She believed that her anonymity in America helped her obtain roles on merit and not due to her public image. She earned the part of Sala, the henchwoman to the villainous Drax (Treat Williams) in the superhero film The Phantom (1996), starring Billy Zane in the titular role. A reviewer for Variety considered Zeta-Jones to be a standout in her part, but the film received a negative critical reception and earned little at the box office. The CBS television miniseries Titanic (1996) was better received. Starring opposite Peter Gallagher and George C. Scott, she played the lead role of Isabella Paradine, a young mother who engages in an extramarital affair aboard the ill-fated RMS Titanic.

=== 1998–2000: Hollywood breakthrough and success ===
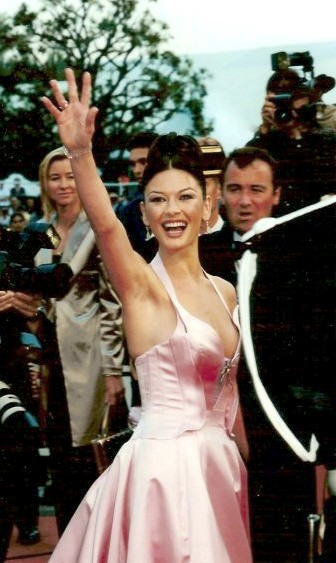
Zeta-Jones attending the premiere of Entrapment at the 1999 Cannes Film Festival

Steven Spielberg took notice of Zeta-Jones in Titanic and recommended her to Martin Campbell, who was directing The Mask of Zorro (1998) for Spielberg's production company Amblin Entertainment. Campbell cast her as the leading lady instead of Izabella Scorupco, who was his original choice for the part. Co-starring Anthony Hopkins and Antonio Banderas, the Old California-set film tells the story of Zorro (Hopkins), a Spanish warrior who sets out to avenge the death of his wife and find his lost daughter Elena (Zeta-Jones). She found similarities between her "volatile" Celtic personality and her Latin character's temperament, and in preparation she learnt dancing, riding and sword-fighting, and took diction lessons in Spanish. Filming action and dance sequences while wearing heavy corsets in the dry Mexican desert proved challenging for Zeta-Jones, but she found the experience "worth suffering for". The Mask of Zorro was positively received by the critics and grossed over $250 million worldwide. The role proved to be a breakthrough for her and she was nominated for the MTV Movie Award for Best Breakthrough Performance.

Zeta-Jones's first release of 1999 was the heist film Entrapment, in which she starred opposite Sean Connery as a seductive insurance agent on the lookout for an art thief. Despite a negative critical reception, the film was a commercial success; Janet Maslin of The New York Times thought the film provided Zeta-Jones a platform to "show off her slithery skills", and Desson Howe of The Washington Post called on viewers to appreciate the sex appeal she brought to the role. Later that year, Zeta-Jones appeared alongside Liam Neeson and Lili Taylor in The Haunting, a remake of the 1963 film of the same name about a team of paranormal experts who look into strange occurrences in an ill-fated mansion. The horror feature received generally poor reviews but found a significant worldwide audience. In a scathing review, the critic Mick LaSalle wrote that "Zeta-Jones seems less an actress and more a pretty face, and not an interesting one at that".

After taking the supporting part of the lead John Cusack's former romantic interest in the comedy-drama High Fidelity (2000), Zeta-Jones starred in Steven Soderbergh's Traffic (2000). In the ensemble thriller on drug abuse co-starring Michael Douglas and Benicio del Toro, she played Helena, the pregnant wife of a drug lord who takes over the business when her husband is arrested. Originally written as a mother of two, Soderbergh changed the part to that of a pregnant woman on Zeta-Jones's suggestion to accommodate her own pregnancy. Highly profitable at the box office and critically acclaimed, Traffic was described by the Dallas Observer as "a remarkable achievement in filmmaking, a beautiful and brutal work". Edward Guthman of the San Francisco Chronicle considered Zeta-Jones to be a standout among the cast and labelled her "sensational" in a scene in which Helena confronts a Tijuana dealer, stating that "through sheer conviction," she "electrifies a moment that could have been absurd." The ensemble of Traffic won the SAG Award for Outstanding Cast and Zeta-Jones was nominated for the Golden Globe Award for Best Supporting Actress.

=== 2001–2004: Established actress ===
The romantic comedy America's Sweethearts was Zeta-Jones's sole film release of 2001. She starred as a shrewd film star, opposite Julia Roberts who featured as her character's under-confident sibling. The critic Roger Ebert compared the film unfavourably to the musical Singin' in the Rain (1952), but thought that Zeta-Jones was aptly "chilly and manipulative" in her part. The following year, she starred as the murderous nightclub singer Velma Kelly in Chicago (2002), a film adaptation of the stage musical of the same name from director Rob Marshall. She based her character's look and mannerisms on the actress Louise Brooks, and as the script did not provide a backstory to Kelly, she worked to convey the character's "flamboyance" and "desperation" through "little looks and nuances". The film and her performance received critical acclaim. William Arnold of the Seattle Post-Intelligencer believed that Zeta-Jones had made "a wonderfully statuesque and bitchy saloon goddess", and David Edelstein of Slate wrote that she "has a smo[u]ldering confidence that takes your mind off her not-always-fluid dancing – although she's a perfectly fine hoofer, with majestic limbs and a commanding cleavage" and particularly praised her rendition of the song "All That Jazz". Chicago grossed $306 million worldwide, and was the recipient of the Academy Award for Best Picture. For her performance, she won the Academy Award, SAG Award, and the BAFTA Award for Best Supporting Actress, among other awards and nominations.

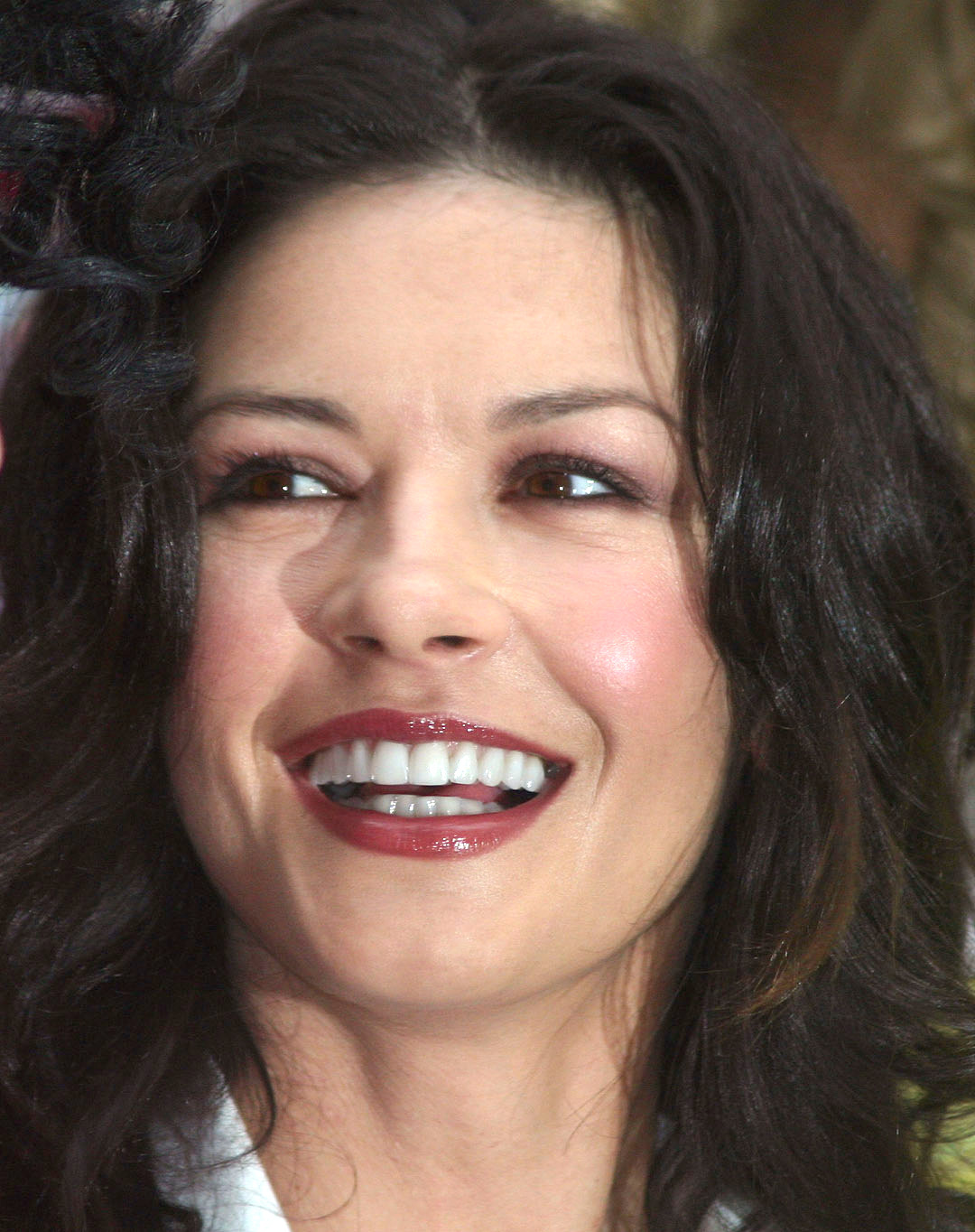
Zeta-Jones at the Hasty Pudding Woman of the Year award ceremony in 2005

Following the success of Chicago, Zeta-Jones voiced the part of Princess Marina in Sinbad: Legend of the Seven Seas (2003), an animated film featuring Brad Pitt as the voice of Sinbad the Sailor. She was drawn to the project to give her young children an opportunity to "hear [her] and get a sense of [her] on film", but the film proved to be a box office bomb. Also in 2003, Zeta-Jones starred alongside George Clooney in the Coen brothers' black comedy Intolerable Cruelty. A commercial success, the film saw her play the role of a serial divorcée who is drawn towards a divorce lawyer (Clooney). Writing for Empire, the critic Damon Wise labelled the film a "dazzling screwball comedy" and felt that Zeta-Jones had shown "an admirable facility for old-school quickfire patter". Other reviewers praised her onscreen chemistry with Clooney.

In 2004, Spielberg approached her to play an insecure air hostess in his comedy The Terminal, a film about a man (Tom Hanks) who is trapped at the JFK International Airport when he is denied entry into the United States. Spielberg was intent on her playing against type as a strong-willed woman, with a vulnerability in her character, but the critic A. O. Scott felt that it came across as using her for "her looks rather than for the arch, self-mocking wit that is her secret weapon as a comic actress". Commercially, The Terminal performed well. She next worked with Soderbergh to film Ocean's Twelve, a sequel to his heist film Ocean's Eleven (2001), which also reunited her with stars Clooney, Pitt, and Roberts. The production, which was filmed in several European countries, saw Zeta-Jones play Isabel Lahiri, a Europol agent, and the love interest of Pitt's character. Paul Clinton of CNN noted that her sex appeal benefited the film. Conversely, Ken Tucker of New York magazine argued that her character was redundant to the film's plot. Despite dividing critics, the sequel grossed over $360 million globally.

=== 2005–2010: Decrease in workload and return to the stage ===
The Legend of Zorro (2005), a sequel to The Mask of Zorro, saw her reprise the role of Elena opposite Banderas. Set ten years after the first film, the sequel follows Elena struggling with married life. Unlike the original, the film was disliked by critics and was a commercial disappointment. She did not have any film releases in 2006. A biopic of Harry Houdini, titled Death Defying Acts (2007), starring Guy Pearce as the escapologist Houdini, featured Zeta-Jones as a Scottish con artist who claims psychic powers. The unsuccessful production was given only a limited theatrical release.

In 2007, Zeta-Jones starred alongside Aaron Eckhart and Abigail Breslin in the romantic comedy No Reservations, a remake of the German film Mostly Martha (2001). No Reservations tells the story of an ambitious chef (Zeta-Jones) whose life changes for the better when she takes in her young niece (Breslin) after her sister's death. In preparation for her part, Zeta-Jones worked in the kitchen and waited on tables at New York's Fiamma Osteria restaurant. Claudia Puig of USA Today wrote that Zeta-Jones "shines as a character that finely balances off-putting reserve with sympathetic appeal", and Roger Ebert, despite disliking the film, did find her to be "convincing" in her role. With a global gross of $92 million, the film marked her final commercial success of the decade.

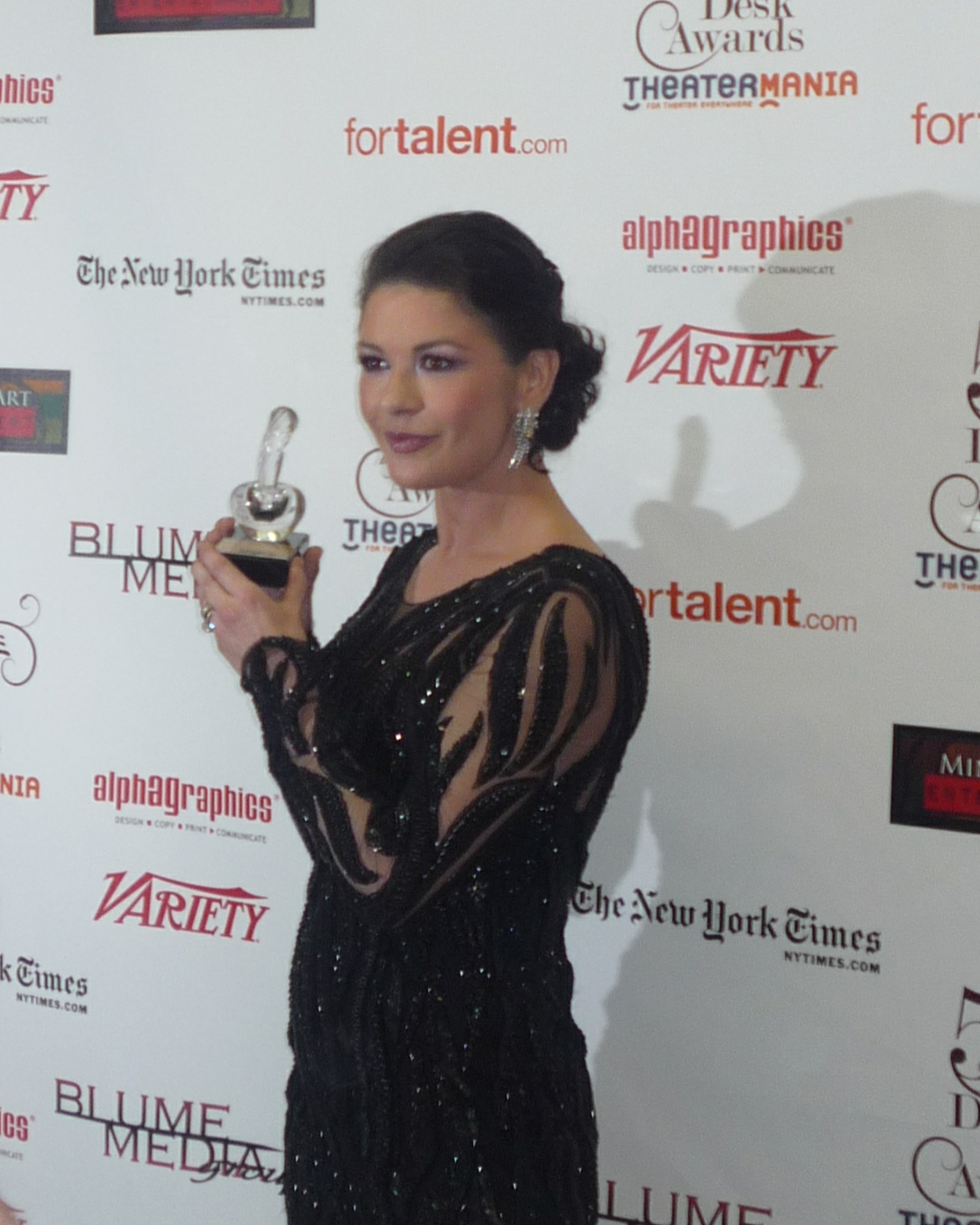
Zeta-Jones at the 2010 Drama Desk Awards ceremony, where she won Outstanding Actress in a Musical for her role in A Little Night Music

After No Reservations, Zeta-Jones significantly decreased her workload in the following five years. She instead chose to focus on her family and health, having been diagnosed with bipolar II disorder, and her infrequent acting appearances were in smaller-scale and less successful productions. She took on the role of a forty-year-old mother attracted to a younger man (Justin Bartha) in the romantic comedy The Rebound. The production was released theatrically in markets outside of the United States in 2009–10, but due to financial troubles of its distributor, The Film Development, the film failed to release theatrically in America.

Zeta-Jones returned to the stage in 2009 with a revival of the Stephen Sondheim musical A Little Night Music, which marked her Broadway debut. Set in Sweden during the early twentieth century, the musical follows the complicated relations between a group of people (including characters played by Zeta-Jones, Angela Lansbury and Alexander Hanson) during the course of a summer. She played Desirée Armfeldt, an ageing actress, and was particularly drawn to the complexities of the piece, explaining: "There's no jazzy hands, no high kicks, no fishnet stockings, ... It's not one of those shows where you can dig about three inches and come out the other end. You can keep digging and digging and digging". She did not listen to previous recordings of the songs in the musical so she could bring her own interpretation to them. The critic Claire Prentice of The Daily Telegraph wrote that Zeta-Jones brought in a "quiet, reflective poignancy" in her rendition of the song "Send In the Clowns", but Emma Brockes of The Guardian was more critical, remarking that "with her pretty voice, head wresting this way and that, [she] seems to be auditioning for stage school". For her performance, Zeta-Jones won the Tony Award and Drama Desk Award for Best Actress in a Musical.

=== 2012–2016: Return to film ===
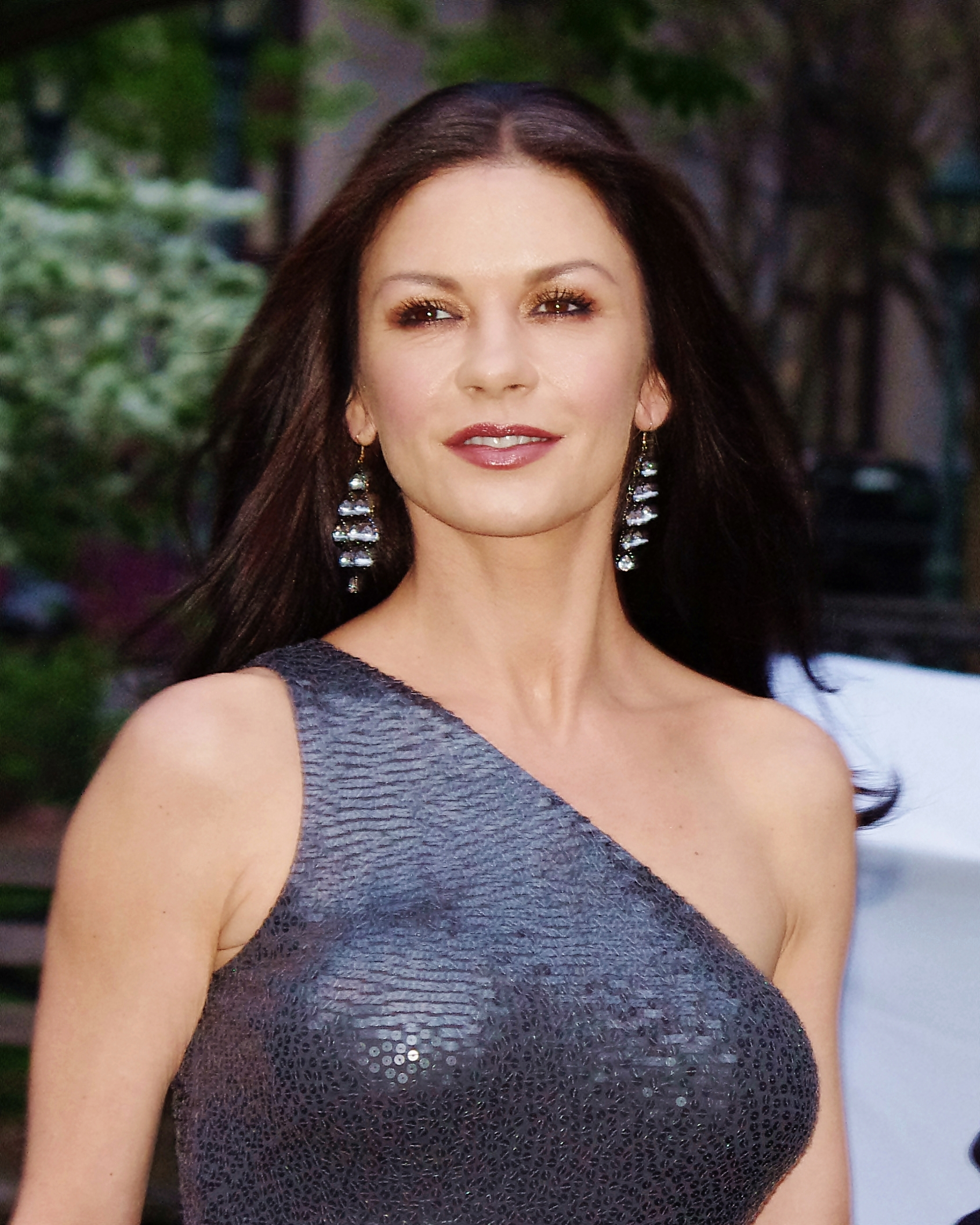
Zeta-Jones in 2012

After a three-year sabbatical from acting, she made her screen comeback in Lay the Favorite (2012), a comedy co-starring Bruce Willis and Rebecca Hall, in which she played the jealous wife of a gambler (Willis). Reviews of the film were negative, and Betsy Sharkey of the Los Angeles Times found Zeta-Jones to be "far too shrill to amuse". In the ensemble musical comedy Rock of Ages, co-starring Tom Cruise and Bryan Cranston, Zeta-Jones played the part of a religiously conservative wife of a mayor. She was attracted to the idea of playing a "nightmare of a woman" and based the role on the politician Michele Bachmann; the film received mixed reviews and failed commercially. Her final release of 2012 was Playing for Keeps, a romantic comedy with Gerard Butler, which proved to be her third box office failure of the year.

In 2013, Zeta-Jones took on a leading role in the crime thriller Broken City, co-starring Mark Wahlberg and Russell Crowe. The film tells the story of a private detective (Wahlberg) who is hired by the mayor of New York City (Crowe) to spy on his wife (Zeta-Jones). The critic Todd McCarthy thought that Zeta-Jones "looks like class itself and nicely underplays", and Liam Lacey of The Globe and Mail observed that the actress "does a fair, if incongruous, impersonation of a forties vamp". As with her previous few projects, it was not widely seen and received poor reviews. This changed when Zeta-Jones collaborated with Soderbergh for the third time to film the critically acclaimed thriller Side Effects (2013). Co-starring Channing Tatum, Jude Law and Rooney Mara, the film saw her play a mysterious psychiatrist who recommends an antidepressant drug with serious side effects. Peter Travers, writing for Rolling Stone, called the film a "hell of a thriller, twisty, terrific and packed with surprises" and found Zeta-Jones to be "dynamite" in it.

In the action comedy Red 2 (2013), which served as a sequel to the 2010 film Red, Zeta-Jones played a seductive Russian double agent, alongside Bruce Willis, Helen Mirren, and Mary-Louise Parker. She was drawn to the project, which follows the comic adventures of retired spies, for "the action, the humour, [and] the tongue-in-cheek quality of it". Writing for The Hollywood Reporter, Justin Lowe stated that Zeta-Jones "nicely pulls off Russian spy Katja's mix of allure and menace", and with a worldwide gross of $148 million, Red 2 emerged as her most widely seen film since No Reservations.

Following Red 2, Zeta-Jones took another sabbatical from acting, saying: "If I'm going to leave my family for any length of time it had better be for a role that I haven't played before, [otherwise] I would prefer to stay at home". She found such a part opposite Bill Nighy and Toby Jones in the British war comedy film Dad's Army (2016), based on the television sitcom of the same name. She was cast as a glamorous journalist reporting on a British Home Guard platoon based in Walmington-on-Sea. Catherine Bray of Variety considered the film to be an "amiable but creaky resurrection" of the sitcom, and added that while Zeta-Jones "hits the required single note with some spirit" she was "generally underused" in it.

=== 2017–present: Television, streaming and return to films ===
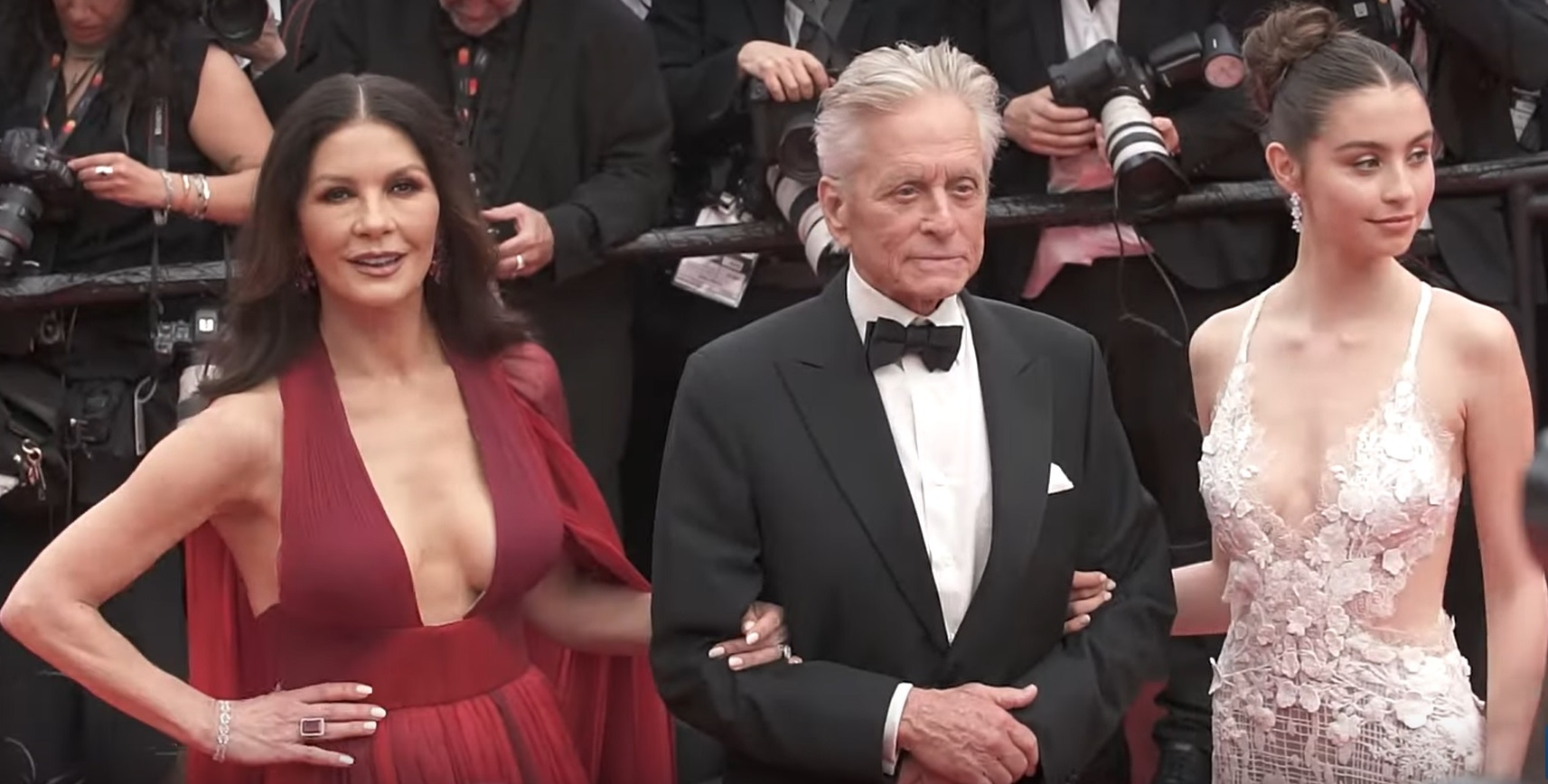
Zeta-Jones with her husband, Michael Douglas, and daughter, Carys, in 2023

Zeta-Jones returned to television in 2017, portraying actress Olivia de Havilland in the first season of Ryan Murphy's anthology drama series Feud, subtitled Bette and Joan, about the rivalry between the actresses Joan Crawford and Bette Davis (played by Jessica Lange and Susan Sarandon, respectively). Dominic Patten of Deadline Hollywood found Zeta-Jones to be "wonderfully cast" and Sonia Saraiya of Variety credited her for providing "the best turn in the show". Displeased with an "unauthori[s]ed use of her name and identity" in the series, de Havilland, at 101 years old, sued the network and producers of Feud for invasion of privacy and other personality rights. The lawsuit was later dismissed by a California appellate court.

In 2018, Zeta-Jones starred as the drug lord Griselda Blanco in the Lifetime television film Cocaine Godmother. Despite her character's misdeeds, she was drawn to her character's fortitude and ability to stand out in a male-dominated business. Writing for IndieWire, Hanh Nguyen criticised the decision to cast Zeta-Jones in the part of a Latino woman, adding that "she's not just unconvincing; she's outlandish". She next played the lead role of Vicki Ellis, an unrelenting pageant coach, in the Facebook Watch comedy-drama series Queen America. To play a character who has bulimia, she drew on her teenage experiences of interacting with dancers who had eating disorders. In a positive review, Jen Chaney of Vulture wrote that "Zeta-Jones is always at her best when she's fiery, and this part gives her plenty of opportunities to shift into beast mode".

Zeta-Jones in Bilbao in 2026

In 2021, Zeta-Jones appeared in a recurring role in the second season of the Fox drama series Prodigal Son. She played Dr. Vivian Capshaw, a doctor, opposite Michael Sheen. The series was cancelled after its second season. She next took on a guest role as Morticia Addams in two episodes of the Netflix fantasy series Wednesday (2022). Dave Nemetz of TVLine found her "exquisitely well-cast" in her small part. Wednesday emerged as the second most-watched English-language Netflix series within three weeks of release. She subsequently played the main antagonist of the Disney+ adventure series National Treasure: Edge of History. Joshua Alston of Variety found Zeta-Jones to be the "best thing" about the show, adding that "her snarling villainy veers so close to camp that it sounds at times like she's workshopping a comedic impression of her own voice". Her supporting performance earned her a nomination at the Children's and Family Emmy Awards.

In 2025, Zeta-Jones reprised her role as Morticia Addams in the second season of the Netflix series Wednesday. Her performance received positive reviews, with Annabel Nugent of The Independent describing it as "particularly enjoyable" and Ben Travis of Empire finding her "excellent".

She then stars and serves as an executive producer in the Prime Video thriller series Kill Jackie, adapted from Nick Harkaway's novel The Price You Pay, which was filmed in her hometown of Swansea. Writing for Collider, Victoria Luxford noted that "Zeta-Jones' wit and charisma successfully elevate Kill Jackie when the plot loses its way".

Zeta-Jones returns to films later that year with Cathy Yan's independent film The Gallerist, co-starring Natalie Portman and Jenna Ortega.

== Other ventures ==
Aside from acting, Zeta-Jones supports various charities and causes. She is a patron of Swansea's Longfields Day Centre for the disabled, and has made sizeable donations to the centre. In 2001, she auctioned an outfit she wore in The Mask of Zorro (1998) to raise funds for AIDS patients in Africa. In 2005, she became the ambassador of the National Society for the Prevention of Cruelty to Children charity, and launched the Full Stop appeal in Wales to raise awareness on child abuse. She has also given her support to other charitable organisations for children such as the International Centre for Missing & Exploited Children and the Noah's Ark Appeal, among others. Zeta-Jones is also the founding host for A Fine Romance, an annual charitable program that helps raise funds for the Motion Picture & Television Fund, and is one of the members of the Cinema for Peace Foundation.

Zeta-Jones briefly dabbled with a singing career in the early 1990s. In 1992, she provided her voice to the character of Palene in Jeff Wayne's musical retelling of Spartacus, entitled Jeff Wayne's Musical Version of Spartacus. Three years later, she released her first single, "In the Arms of Love", on Wayne's Wow! Records. She sang "True Love Ways", a duet with David Essex, in 1994.

Zeta-Jones has featured as an advertising spokeswoman for several brands and products. She was named the global ambassador for the cosmetics company Elizabeth Arden, Inc. in 2002. Also that year, she was signed on by the phone company T-Mobile for an estimated $10 million per year, making her the highest-paid celebrity endorser at the time. In 2017, Zeta-Jones launched her own line of home decoration products named Casa Zeta-Jones. Also that year, she featured in a theatrical production of The Children's Monologues, in which she performed a monologue as a mathematically inclined young girl. The event raised funds for Dramatic Need, a charity that helps African children pursue a career in the arts.

== Personal life ==
The success of The Darling Buds of May (1991–93) made Zeta-Jones a celebrity in Britain, and her personal life has since been chronicled by the media. Her relationships in the early 1990s with television personality John Leslie, singer David Essex, and pop star Mick Hucknall were heavily publicised by the British press. In the mid-1990s, she was briefly engaged to Scottish actor Angus Macfadyen. In a 1995 interview with the Daily Mirror, she described her lifestyle thus: "I drink, I swear, I like sex".

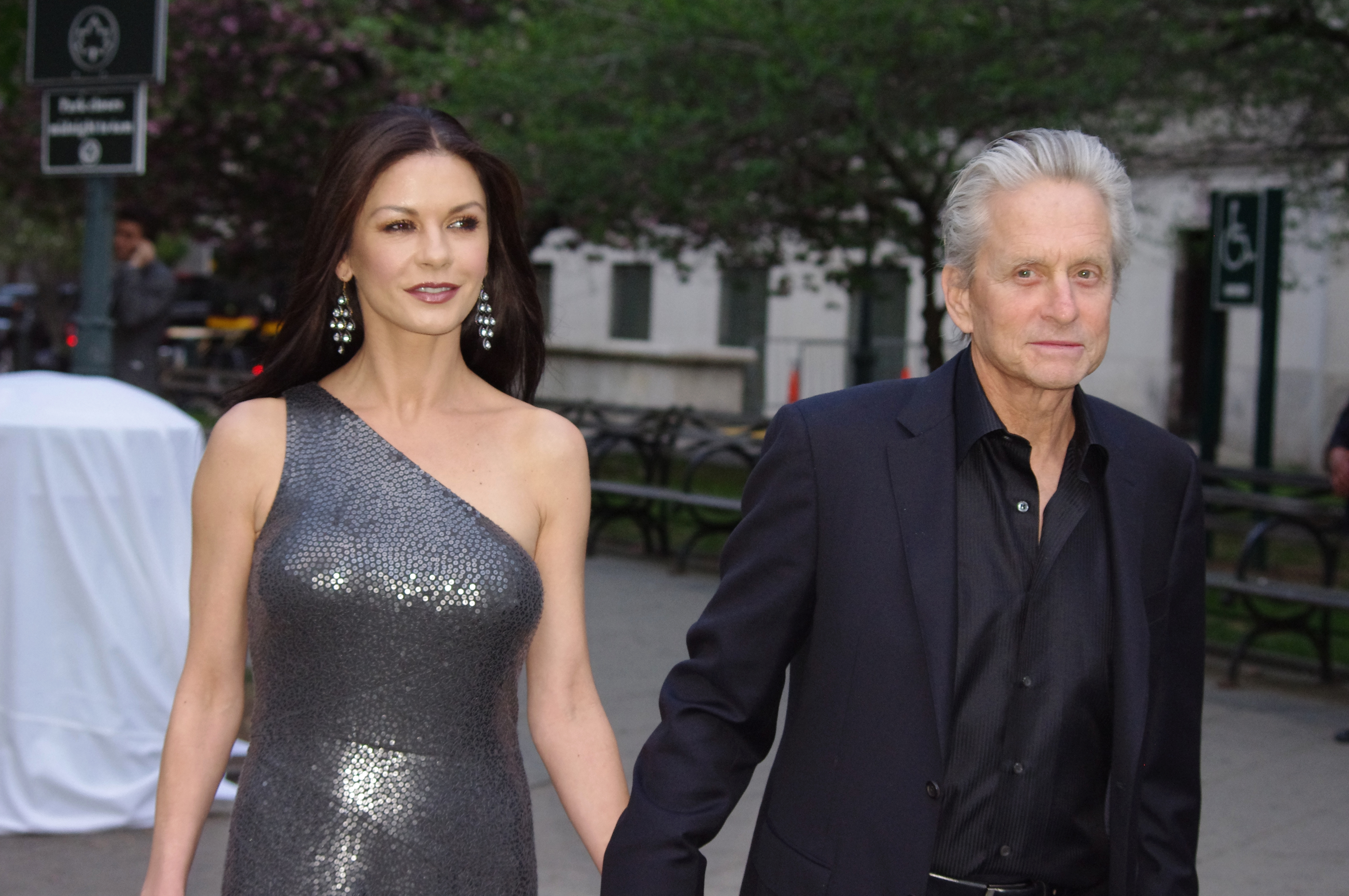
Zeta-Jones with her husband Michael Douglas in 2012

Zeta-Jones met American actor Michael Douglas, with whom she shares her birthday and who is 25 years her senior, at the Deauville American Film Festival in France in August 1998, after being introduced by Danny DeVito. They became engaged on 31 December 1999, and married at the Plaza Hotel in New York City on 18 November 2000 after Douglas's divorce was finalised. Douglas insisted on a pre-nuptial agreement after his first wife, Diandra, was awarded 60 million USD when the couple divorced. The high-profile ceremony, which cost an estimated £1.5 million, was labelled the "wedding of the year" by the BBC. They signed a £1 million deal with OK! magazine to release photographs of the event, and the rest of the press were not permitted to enter. In spite of this, journalists for Hello! magazine surreptitiously took pictures of the ceremony, and the couple successfully sued the publication for invasion of privacy. They have two children: son Dylan Michael (born August 2000) and daughter Carys Zeta (born April 2003).

In 2004, Zeta-Jones and Michael Douglas had a home built in Swansea. Her parents reportedly lived there when Zeta-Jones and Douglas were elsewhere. Until 2009, the family lived in Bermuda and as of 2016, live in rural New York state. They also have a coastal estate near Valldemossa, Mallorca. In a 2025 interview with The Times, Zeta-Jones revealed that she and Douglas own four properties, one in Canada, one in Spain, and two in New York.

=== Health ===
In 2010, Douglas was diagnosed with tongue cancer and Zeta-Jones thus faced an emotionally turbulent time, saying: "When you get sideswiped like that [with the illness] it's an obvious trigger for your balance to be a little bit off – not sleeping, worry, stress." This trigger led to Zeta-Jones experiencing depression, and despite initial apprehension, she went public with her bipolar II disorder diagnosis. She sought treatment by checking into hospital in 2011, and again in 2013. Owing to the stress of both their illnesses, the couple decided to live separately in 2013, though without taking legal action towards separation or divorce. They reconciled in 2014, with Douglas saying they were "stronger than ever".

== Media image ==
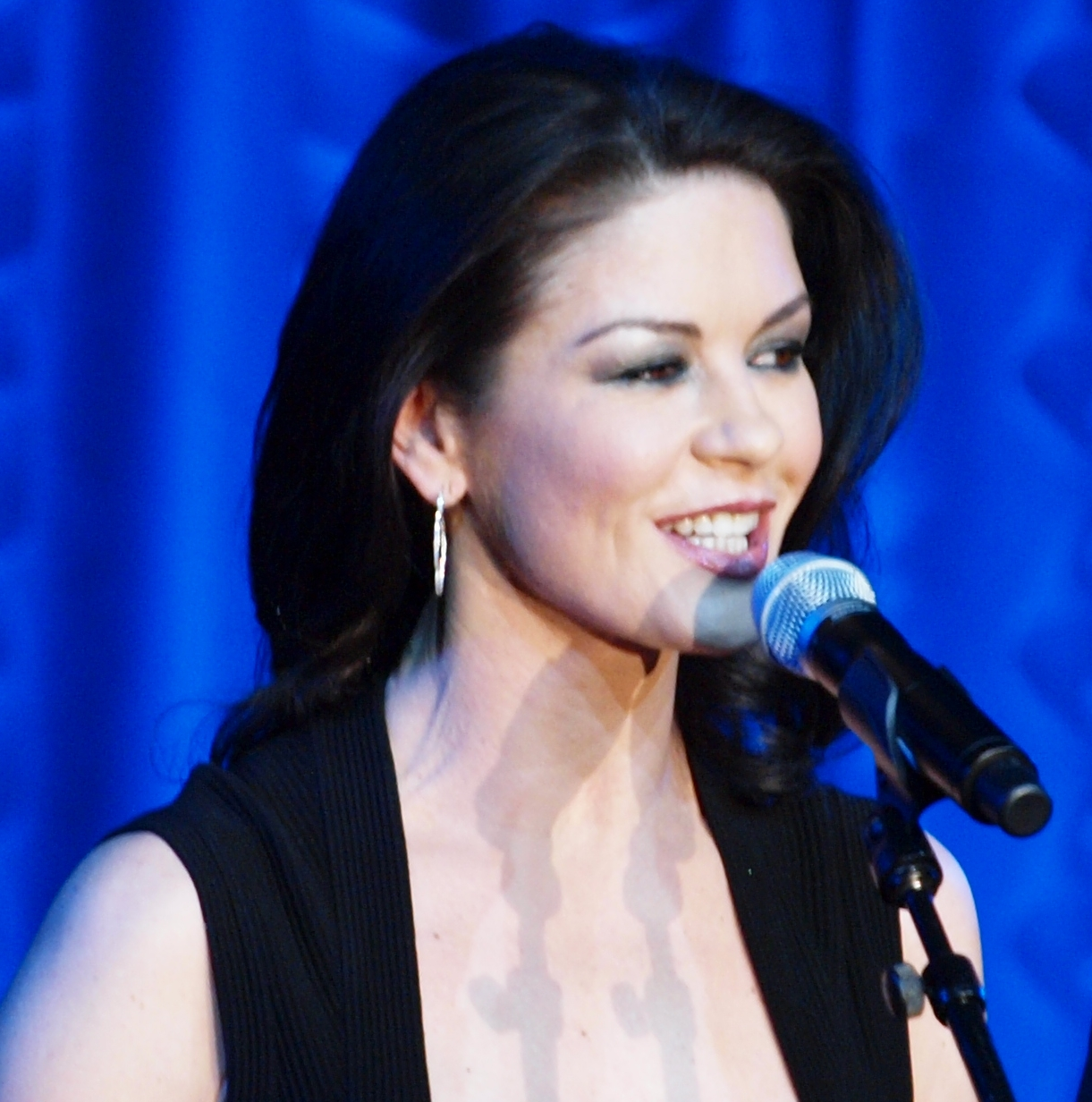
Zeta-Jones at a Drama League Benefit Gala in 2010

Zeta-Jones's beauty and sex appeal have been picked up by various media outlets, including People magazine, which placed her at number one on their "Most Beautiful People" listing in 1998. She continued to feature on the list from 2000 to 2004. In 2003, Esquire labelled her "the most beautiful woman on the planet". In 2011, she was named the most beautiful British woman by a poll conducted by the television network QVC. She was appointed as a Commander of the Order of the British Empire (CBE) by Queen Elizabeth II in the 2010 Birthday Honours for her film and charity work. In 2019, she was honoured with the Freedom of the City of Swansea.

The journalist Sheila Johnston of The Daily Telegraph, in 2010, described Zeta-Jones as "the ultimate self-made success" who "constantly made bold decisions, and scrubbed up very nicely into a luscious star who radiates a classic […] brand of big-screen glamour." Guy Adams of The Independent considers her personality to be "self-effacing and energetic" but takes note of the "steely core" in her off-screen persona. Zeta-Jones's success in her early Hollywood films The Mask of Zorro (1998) and Entrapment (1999) relied predominantly on her sex appeal, but she was later appreciated for her versatility.

Zeta-Jones's career graph and marriage to Douglas have been a subject of satire. A 2006 episode of the satirical British television show Star Stories (2006–2008) was entitled Catherine Zeta-Jones—Her Quest to Prove Herself ... And Also Find Love, about a fictitious life story of Zeta-Jones. Addressing her perceived media image, she remarked in a 2004 interview with USA Weekend: "The biggest misconception of me is that I'm some die-hard, ambitious, do-anything-to-get-anything kind of person, I'm not. I'm very shy socially." Zeta-Jones is protective of her public image, and the use of her likeness is carefully controlled. As well as taking legal action against Hello! magazine, she sued a Nevada-based topless club for including her image on their advertising. In 2003, the celebrity biographer Cliff Goodwin wrote an unauthorised biography of the actress, entitled Catherine Zeta Jones: The Biography, but the publication was indefinitely postponed after her lawyers issued threats of legal action against both Goodwin and his publisher.

== Acting credits and awards ==
Zeta-Jones's films that have earned the most at the box office, as of 2016, include:

- The Mask of Zorro (1998)
- Entrapment (1999)
- The Haunting (1999)
- Traffic (2000)
- America's Sweethearts (2001)
- Chicago (2002)
- Intolerable Cruelty (2003)
- Ocean's Twelve (2004)
- The Terminal (2004)
- The Legend of Zorro (2005)
- No Reservations (2007)
- Red 2 (2013)

For her role in Chicago (2002), Zeta-Jones was awarded the Academy Award, Screen Actors Guild Award, and BAFTA Award for Best Supporting Actress. She has received two Golden Globe Award nominations: Best Supporting Actress for Traffic (2000) and Best Actress in a Comedy or Musical for Chicago (2002). For her leading role in Broadway's 2009 revival of A Little Night Music, Zeta-Jones was awarded the Tony Award for Best Actress in a Musical.

== See also ==
- List of Academy Award winners and nominees from Great Britain
- List of actors with Academy Award nominations
