= Amber Sainsbury =

New Zealand actress

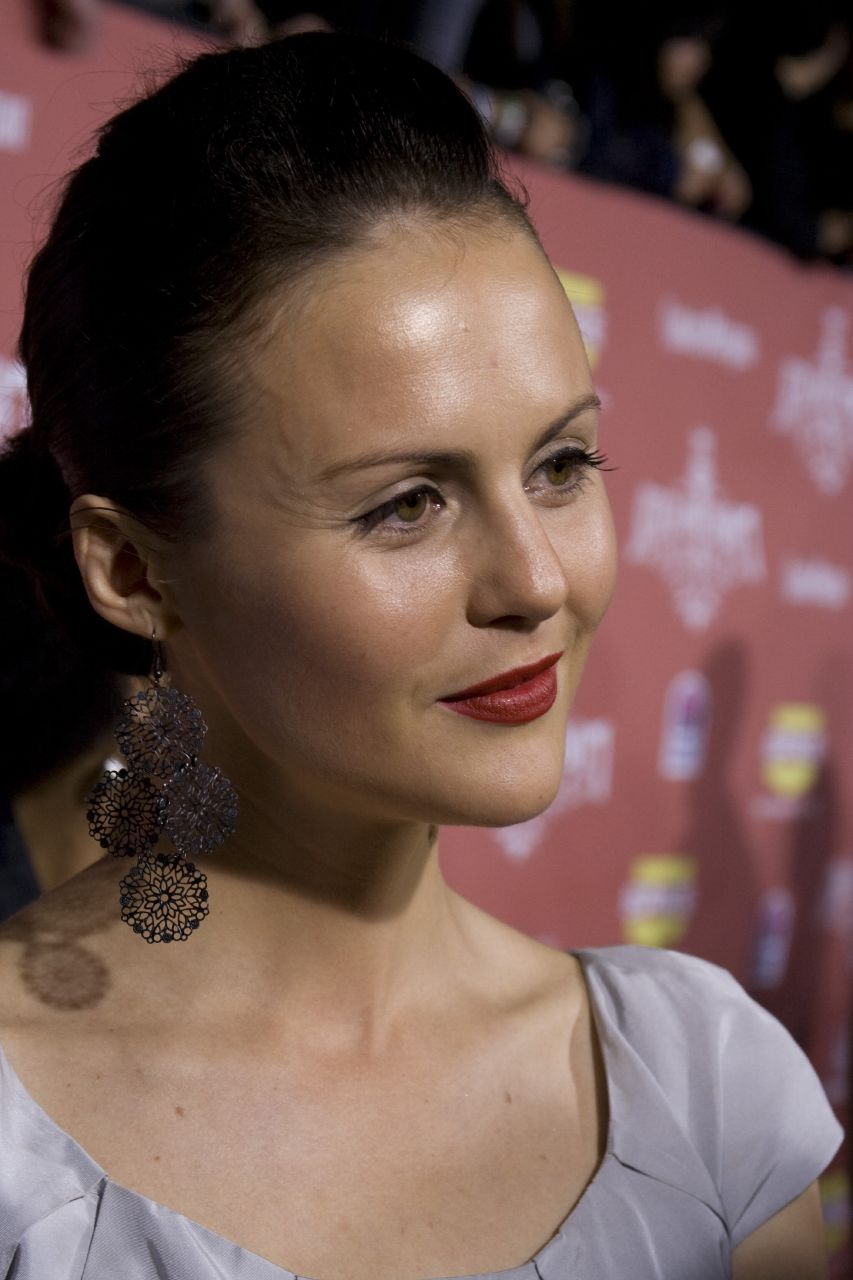
- Sainsbury at the 2007 Scream Awards
- Born: 28 August 1978 (age 48); New Zealand
- Education: University of Auckland; King's College London
- Years active: 1995-2008
- Spouse: Jamie Campbell (m. 2011)

Amber Sainsbury (born 28 August 1978) is a New Zealand actress, philanthropist, and producer. She starred in the Sky One series Hex (2005). She is a founder of the charity Dramatic Need.

== Biography ==
Sainsbury attended St Cuthbert's College, Auckland. She trained at the Webber Douglas Academy of Dramatic Art in London.

In 2005, Sainsbury starred in the first series of Sky One UK series Hex as Roxanne Davenport. She also appeared in Coronation Street, The Bill, Trevor's World of Sport, A Touch of Frost, the BBC's 'Fairytales' series, and the films Channelling Baby and The Ferryman.

After filming 30 Days of Night with Josh Hartnett in South Africa, Sainsbury left acting in 2007 to found the African-based arts charity Dramatic Need, of which she is a trustee. Sainsbury invited Academy Award-winning film director Danny Boyle as well as the Shakespearian actor Sir Antony Sher to join the board of trustees. Notable supporters of the charity include the bands Coldplay and Supergrass, actors Hartnett and David Walliams, and supermodel and photographer Helena Christensen.

Sainsbury was a contributor to the 2009 Commonwealth Ministers Reference Book alongside then British Prime Minister's wife Sarah Jane Brown on the arts in education . She was a keynote speaker on the role of arts in development at the British Arts Council's Creative Partnerships Conference in 2009 and has spoken at Oxfam and the South African High Commission in London on the subject. In March 2009 Sainsbury was voted one of the year's Inspirational Women by British Vogue. In 2010 and 2015, she produced The Children's Monologues at the Old Vic Theatre and the Royal Court Theatre.

In 2010, Sainsbury took British citizenship. She continued to teach drama workshops in Africa on conflict resolution and gender issues. On 10 September 2011, Sainsbury married filmmaker Jamie Campbell on the island of Paxos in Greece.

Sainsbury graduated from the University of Auckland in 2012 with a dual degree in History and Italian language. She then pursued a Master in Psychology and Neuroscience at King's College London. She joined the production company Left Bank Pictures as an executive producer.

== Filmography ==
=== Film ===
- 1999 - Channelling Baby
- 2004 - The Purifiers
- 2005 - The Poseidon Adventure
- 2006 - The Ferryman
- 2007 - 30 Days of Night

=== Television ===
- 1995 - Plainclothes
- 2002 - The Bill
- 2002 - Coronation Street
- 2003 - Trevor's World of Sport
- 2004 - A Touch of Frost
- 2005 - Hex
- 2008 - Fairy Tales
