= Diego de Arana =

Spanish governorof La Navidad, Haiti

- Born: 1468; Harana/Valle de Arana, Spain
- Died: 1493 (aged 24–25); La Navidad, Haiti
- Relatives: Beatriz Enríquez de Arana

Diego de Arana (1468 in Cordoba, Spain – 1493 in Haiti) was governor of the first documented Spanish settlement in the New World, at La Navidad.

He was a sailor of Castile who accompanied Christopher Columbus on his first voyage to America, where Arana was killed by natives.

Arana is described as a native of Córdoba in the journal of Columbus. The History of the Admiral by Ferdinand Columbus says Diego was the son of Rodrigo de Arana. He was a cousin of Beatriz Enriquez de Arana, who was the mistress of Christopher Columbus.

== Christopher Columbus background and connection ==
In early 1486, Columbus was living in the court of King Ferdinand V and Queen Isabella I in Seville, Spain. Columbus was trying to convince them to finance his "Enterprise of the Indies", a far reaching expedition to reach the East by going West. Columbus knew the Canaries Current and hoped he could reach the Indias by taking advantage of this ocean phenomenon. The monarchs were interested in Columbus's idea but were focused on the war in Granada against the Moors. Columbus was given subsistence and allowed to stay at the monarchs' castle in Cordoba as they thought he might have an idea that would provide riches and spread Christianity. While waiting for a decision and another meeting with the royals, Columbus patronized a local apothecary shop operated by people from Genoa, Italy. Columbus is believed to have come from the Genoa area and is associated with doctors, physicians, surgeons, astronomers, scientists, and others who also patronized the Genoese pharmacy. There he also became friends with a young man, Diego de Arana.

Diego had two orphaned cousins in the family's household, Beatriz Enríquez de Arana and her brother Pedro Enríquez de Arana. Diego introduced Beatriz, a 20 (or 21) year old woman to Columbus in 1487. At the time Columbus was 35. They became lovers and in August 1488 they had a son named Ferdinand Columbus (aka Hernando Colon). They never married. Diego's family, who adopted Beatriz, had a prosperous wine business. They may have helped Columbus with money for his expeditions.

== Voyage with Columbus ==
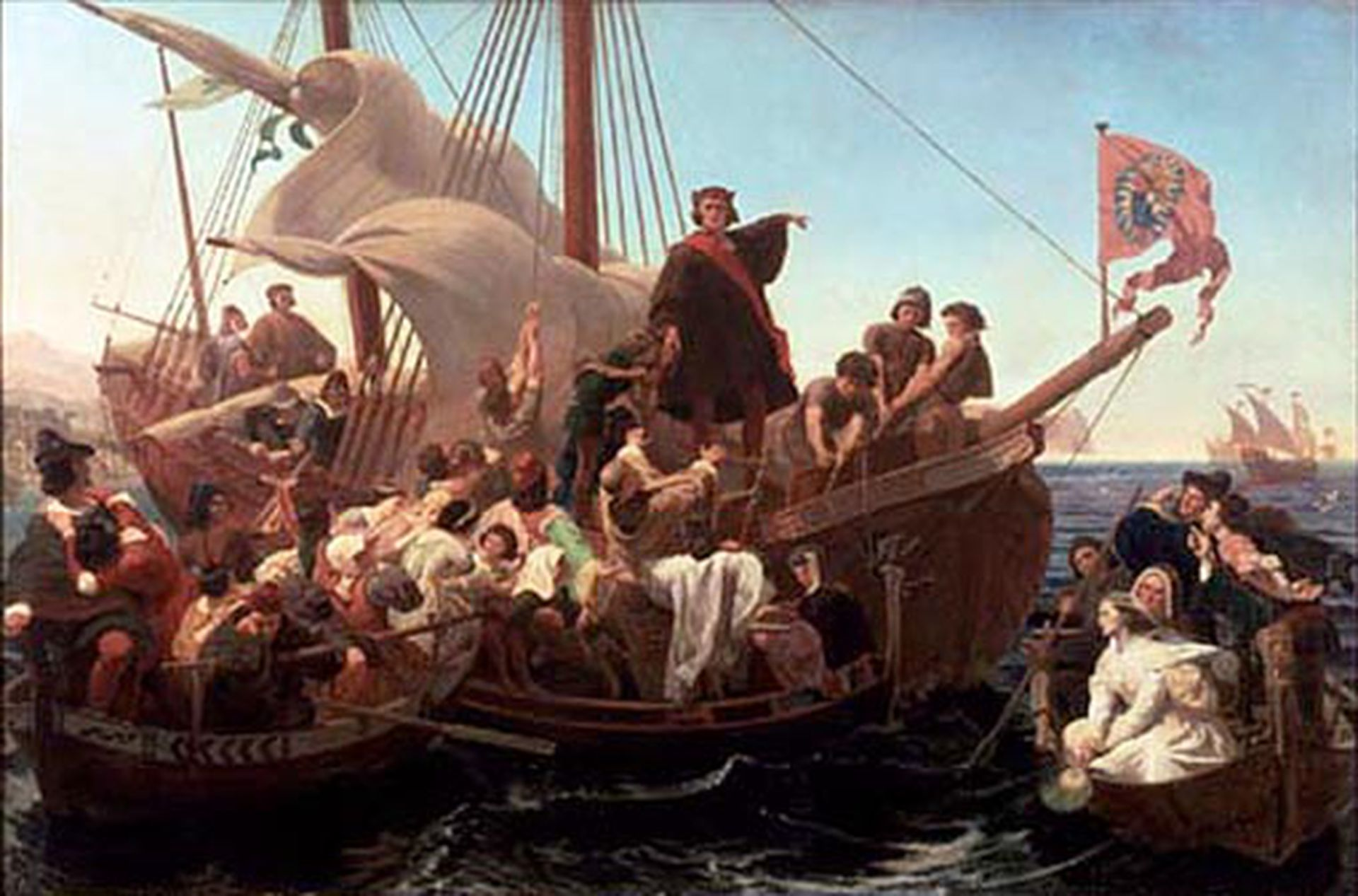
Columbus on Santa Maria in 1492

When Columbus left for his first voyage to the New World, he took Diego with him on the Santa Maria as the master-at-arms. The Santa Maria ran aground off the present-day site of Cap-Haïtien, Haiti on December 25, 1492, and was lost. Realizing that the ship was beyond repair, Columbus ordered his men to strip the timbers from the ship. The timbers from the ship were later used to build Môle Saint-Nicolas, which was originally called La Navidad (Christmas) because the wreck occurred on Christmas Day.

Following the sinking of the Santa Maria and the temporary loss of the Pinta, Columbus, who longed to return to Spain to announce his discoveries, chose to leave behind 36 men who did not fit in the Nina for the return trip. Along with Diego de Arana were his lieutenants: Gutierrez, baker of the king's bench, Ferdinand Segovia, and Rodrigo de Escobedo, notary. For the defense of those men, the expedition built a fort, La Navidad, with the help of native Taino and timbers from the Santa Maria. He appointed Diego de Arana as governor of the settlement. Columbus received permission from Guacanagaríx, the chief or cacique of the nearest tribe, to settle there.

On Friday, January 4, 1493, Columbus set sail in the Niña in search of the third ship in the fleet, the Pinta. The Pinta was commanded by Martín Alonzo Pinzón and had been absent for six weeks. On the night of November 21, the caravel Pinta had vanished into the darkness off the coast of Cuba, and in his journal Columbus accused Pinzón of deliberately having separated the Pinta from the other ships in order to beat the admiral to the rich sources of gold which Columbus imagined were in the immediate area. On Sunday morning, January 6, 1493, the missing Pinta was spotted approaching from the east, and after a heated argument between the two men, the fleet returned to gather people and supplies for a return voyage.

== Death ==
When Columbus came back from Spain during his second voyage, on November 27, 1493, he expected to see a bustling village. When he landed, however, he saw eleven corpses of his men on the beach and discovered that La Navidad had been destroyed. He was told by nearby Taínos that the settlers had mistreated the natives, who retaliated by killing the settlers. Other sources say there was insubordination within the colonists, which led to their deaths, including the death of Diego de Arana.

== Portrayals ==
Diego de Arana was played by Derek Bond in the 1949 film, Christopher Columbus.
