= Channelling Baby =

- Advertising poster
- Directed by: Christine Parker
- Written by: Christine Parker
- Produced by: Caterina De Nave
- Starring: Danielle Cormack; Kevin Smith; Amber Sainsbury; Joel Tobeck
- Cinematography: Rewa Harré
- Edited by: Chris Plummer
- Music by: Peter Dasent
- Release date: 1999
- Running time: 92 minutes
- Language: English

Channelling Baby is a 1999 New Zealand film starring several of the country's well known actors as well as up and coming actress Amber Sainsbury.

== Plot ==
After being blinded by taking drugs in the 1970s during an eclipse, Bunnie (Danielle Cormack) marries her Vietnam soldier boyfriend, Geoff (Kevin Smith). However, as she remains very flaky, he eventually disappears and takes their child with him. Twenty years later, Bunnie decides to use a medium, Cassandra (Amber Sainsbury), to try to find her daughter.

== Cast ==
- Danielle Cormack as Bunnie
- Kevin Smith as Geoff
- Amber Sainsbury as Cassandra
- Jodie Rimmer as Baby (voice)
- Donogh Rees as Childbirth Nurse #1
- William Sabin as David Curtis
- Joel Tobeck as Tony
- Alison Wall as Childbirth Nurse #2
- Bunny Walters as himself
- Joshua Bricknell as Baby #1
- Marise Wipani as Birth Doctor

== Awards ==
Year	Result	Award	Category	Recipient
1999	Won	New Zealand Film and TV Awards	Film Award Best Make Up	Denise Kum
