= The Ferryman (2007 film) =

2007 New Zealand horror film by Chris Graham

- Theatrical poster
- Directed by: Chris Graham
- Written by: Nick Ward
- Produced by: Richard Fletcher; Alan Harris; Matthew Metcalfe
- Starring: John Rhys-Davies; Kerry Fox; Sally Stockwell; Amber Sainsbury; Ben Fransham
- Edited by: Nigel Galt
- Distributed by: Magna Pacific
- Release date: 11 April 2007 (Brussels International Festival of Fantasy Films)
- Running time: 97 minutes
- Country: New Zealand
- Language: English

The Ferryman is a 2007 New Zealand horror film directed by Chris Graham and starring British actor John Rhys-Davies and New Zealand actress Amber Sainsbury.

The 1970s style film follows a group of twenty-somethings who charter a boat to Fiji for the trip of a lifetime, before stumbling upon an evil that demands vengeance at any cost.

The film has sold to over 38 countries including the United States, Great Britain, Germany and most of Asia, with worldwide sales receipts now in the millions of dollars.

== Plot ==
A group of tourists: Chris, a wealthy American; Tate, Chris's temperamental fiancé; Kathy, an ex-nurse haunted by recurring nightmares of a young girl who died in her care; her boyfriend Zane; Big Dave, the owner and captain of a luxurious yacht; and his wife Suze set sail on a leisure trip to Fiji.

The voyage is interrupted when they respond to a distress signal from a nearby vessel, and rescue its sole surviving crew member ("The Greek").

Unbeknownst to the group, The Greek is possessed by the malevolent spirit of a man who seeks to cheat death by using an enchanted dagger to swap souls with a succession of new hosts. The Greek attacks Zane, taking control of his body, before embarking on a murderous rampage of which Kathy, Zane (now trapped in The Greek's dying body) and Tate (who is ultimately possessed by the spirit) are the only survivors.

Kathy and Zane escape after the girl from Kathy's dream visits her and reveals the spirit's origin and how to defeat it: The spirit cannot possess money, as this would compel it to pay the fare which would allow the titular Ferryman to convey it into the afterlife.

Kathy tricks the possessed Tate into accepting a coin that the girl gave her. The Ferryman appears and claims the spirit, before disappearing into the darkness.

The final scenes show Kathy in Fiji, luring a man she meets at a party back to her room, so that Zane can use the dagger to transfer his soul into the man's body.

== Cast ==
Actor	Role
John Rhys-Davies	The Greek
Kerry Fox	Suze
Sally Stockwell	Tate
Amber Sainsbury	Kathy
Tamer Hassan	Big Dave
Craig Hall	Chris Hamilton
Julian Arahanga	Zane
Lawrence Makoare	Snakke
Ben Fransham	The Ferryman
