= Here (play) =

British comedy play by Michael Frayn

- Premiere programme

Here is a philosophical comedic play by British playwright Michael Frayn. It is about a young couple who move into a new flat and perpetually argue about how they make decisions. It was first performed at the Donmar Warehouse in 1993, when it starred Iain Glen as Phil and Teresa Banham as Cath. It flopped at the time but it has since been re-written. A BBC radio production was broadcast in 2007 with the roles played by Samuel West, Lucy Trageer and Margaret Courtney as Pat the landlady. It was revived on stage at the Rose Theatre, Kingston in April 2012 starring Zawe Ashton, Alex Beckett and Alison Steadman.

It was produced in Athens, Greece in December 2009, at the "Treno sto Rouf" theater. The critically acclaimed production, starring Iris Chatziantoniou, Vaggelis Rokkos and Kaliopi Tachtsoglou under the direction of Iossif Vardakis, played with the idea of place, as the theatre is a converted railway carriage.

It is available as a book: Publisher S. French, 1994; ISBN 0573694087, and also published by Methuen Publishing Ltd 2001; ISBN 0413752305
