= The Children's Monologues =

2010 play, revived several times

- Company: Dramatic Need
- Date of premiere: 14 November 2010
- Location: Old Vic Theatre

Creative team
- Director: Danny Boyle
- Writers: Lynn Nottage; Bola Agbaje; Polly Stenham; Dennis Kelly; Anya Reiss; Zawe Ashton; Joel Horwood; Gabriel Bisset-Smith; Jamie Minoprio; Oladipo Agboluaje; Roy Williams
- Music by: Paul Gladstone-Reid
- [www.dramaticneed.org/monologues.php Official website]

The Children's Monologues is a theatrical performance featuring the adapted stories of children's first-hand experiences in South Africa. It was directed by Danny Boyle and first produced as a one-off charity performance in November 2010 at the Old Vic Theatre in London in aid of Danny Boyle's arts charity Dramatic Need. An anniversary performance was produced the Royal Court Theatre in London on 25 October 2015 as an anniversary gala, and it premiered in New York City at Carnegie Hall in 2017. The shows were also produced at theatres in South Africa around the same times.

== Synopsis ==
The Children's Monologues soliloquise the testimonies and re-lived memories of young people in South Africa, some still small children. Some struggled with horrible realities of death and violence, while others shared cherished moments of rare and short-lived happiness. The monologues ranged from light hearted tales of birthday parties and the joy of birthday oranges, to a redemptive tale of a gangster-gone-good to absolutely harrowing, brutally raw stories of rape and violation.

== History of performances ==
The Children's Monologues includes elements of music, dance, and the visual arts. The show was produced by Amber Sainsbury at Old Vic Theatre in London on 14 November 2010 as a one-off, in aid of Danny Boyle's arts charity Dramatic Need, which operates in Rwanda and South Africa, helping young people to come to terms with trauma and conflict.

The first-hand accounts of the children were adapted by a number of playwrights, retold and re-interpreted by and performed by actors such as Catherine Zeta-Jones, Charlie Cox, Sir Ben Kingsley, Benedict Cumberbatch, Tom Hiddleston, Kit Harington, Gemma Arterton, and Eddie Redmayne, in 2010 and directed by Boyle.

The show was reprised at the Royal Court Theatre on 25 October 2015 as an anniversary gala, again for the benefit of Dramatic Need, directed by Boyle and associate director Gbolahan Obisesan.

In 13 November 2017 The Children's Monologues was once again performed in aid of Dramatic Need, this time starring a mostly new cast, which included a number of American stars, such as Jessica Chastain. As in previous years, the show was also staged in South Africa on 13 November, at the Market Theatre in Johannesburg. This performance featured an all-female cast of actors from across Africa, as well as by children from rural South Africa. The Via Vyndal Pantsula Dance Crew made their appearance outside South Africa, and Kenny Leon co-directed the performance. The show lasted for three hours.

== Casts ==
=== 2010 cast ===
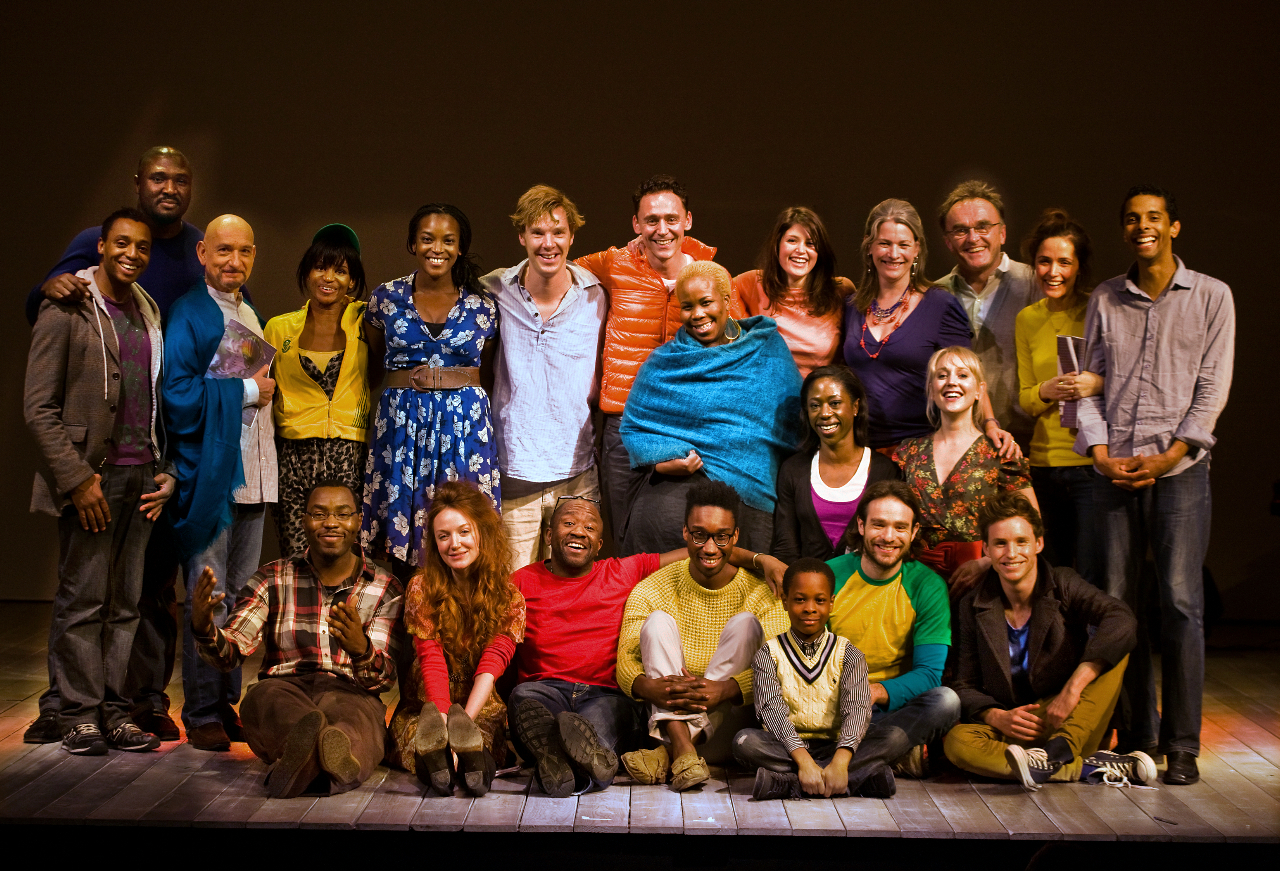
The cast of The Children's Monologues (2010)

- Nikki Amuka-Bird, a woman infected with AIDS finding out she's pregnant
- Nonso Anozie
- Gemma Arterton
- Catherine Zeta-Jones
- Rose Byrne
- Charlie Cox, a young boy hugely excited to be taking part in a math contest
- Benedict Cumberbatch, a missionary worker helping a young boy who had been caught stealing
- Kerry Fox
- Olivia Grant
- Tom Hiddleston, a young girl excited for the birthday orange she was to receive, only to have it eaten by an elephant at the zoo
- Jenny Jules
- Ben Kingsley, a young girl who was gang-raped on Christmas Eve
- Hattie Morahan
- Wunmi Mosaku, a young girl whose birthday preparations are interrupted by the arrival of 4 squatters who beat and rape her
- Lucian Msamati, an over-protective father providing his daughter with his many pearls of wisdom on her first day of school
- Eddie Redmayne, a young boy positively ecstatic at the prospect of turning 7 and all the wonders his birthday party will bring
- Nathan Stewart-Jarrett

=== 2015 cast ===
The 2015 cast included:

- Adewale Akinnuoye-Agbaje
- Alfie Allen
- Zawe Ashton
- Cressida Bonas
- Nazanin Boniadi
- Benedict Cumberbatch
- Christopher Eccleston
- Chiwetel Ejiofor
- Kit Harington
- Josh Hartnett
- Daniel Kaluuya
- Nicole Kidman
- Rose Leslie
- Gugu Mbatha-Raw
- James McAvoy
- Wunmi Mosaku
- David Thewlis

=== 2017 cast ===
The 2017 cast included:

- Jason Alexander
- McKinley Belcher III
- Jessica Chastain
- Common
- Daveed Diggs
- Andrew Garfield
- Anne Hathaway
- Daniel Kaluuya
- Gugu Mbatha-Raw
- James McAvoy
- Audra McDonald
- Sienna Miller
- Javier Muñoz
- Trevor Noah
- Susan Sarandon
- Sebastian Stan
- Lakeith Stanfield
- Catherine Zeta-Jones

== Production ==
=== Writers ===
Contributing writers include:

- James Graham
- Tanika Gupta
- David Hare
- Amy Jephta
- Neil LaBute
- Napo Masheane
- Eliot Moleba
- Mongiwekhaya
- Jack Thorne
- Laura Wade
- Richard Warlow
- Roy Williams

Also listed in 2017 were:

- Ngozi Anyanwu
- Yaël Farber
- Joel Horwood
- Dennis Kelly
- Jamie Minoprio
- Dominique Morisseau
- Lynn Nottage
- Tom Stoppard

=== Music ===
The music for the 2010 event was arranged by British composer Paul Gladstone-Reid MBE. He incorporated original recordings of the children reading their stories in Sesotho and Tswana into the score.

In 2015, British rapper Little Simz, FKA Twigs, and classical pianist James Rhodes performed.

The 2017 performance at Carnegie hall featured a number of teenagers from across the city, invited by Carnegie Hall's Weill Music. There were also performances by singer and double bassist Esperanza Spalding and Little Simz. Cynthia Erivo and Sheku Kanneh-Mason also performed in the production.
