= 1001 Nights (1990 film) =

Les 1001 Nuits
- French film poster for Les 1001 Nuits
- Directed by: Philippe de Broca
- Written by: Philippe de Broca; Jérôme Tonnerre
- Starring: Catherine Zeta-Jones; Thierry Lhermitte; Gérard Jugnot; Stéphane Freiss
- Cinematography: Jean Tournier
- Edited by: Henri Lanoë
- Music by: Gabriel Yared
- Distributed by: UGC Distribution
- Release date: 1990
- Running time: 100 minutes
- Countries: France; Italy
- Box office: 254,739 tickets (France)

Les 1001 Nuits is a French-Italian fantasy film loosely based on the ancient Arabic legend One Thousand and One Nights. It is directed by Philippe de Broca and stars Catherine Zeta-Jones as Sheherazade, who has married a king (Thierry Lhermitte), who desires to have many virgin wives, but only one at a time. As soon as the King has consummated his relationship with a new wife, he has her put to death at sunrise. Sheherazade delays this unfortunate ending by putting off the connubial event for a thousand and one nights, telling irresistible stories that are unfinished when the sun rises. In this version, Sheherazade finds a magical lamp that holds the genie Jimmy Genius (Gerard Jugnot) who is from the 20th century. Jimmy helps Sheherazade by providing her with 20th-century technology including a parachute that is used to drop a nude Sheherazade into a man's lap.

Actress Catherine Zeta Jones received her first film role in Les 1001 Nuits. The film was shot in 1989 and released in 1990 to little acclaim.

== Plot ==
In ancient Arabia, a caliph marries a different beautiful girl every morning, and then he has her killed every night. One of these girls, named Scheherazade, decides to rebel against the authority of the bloody caliph. To prevent the caliph from executing her, she entertains him by telling a fantastic story every night. Among these stories is the legend of Sinbad the sailor, who made seven journeys to seven different lands, meeting magical creatures and finding priceless treasures. Once Scheherazade runs out of stories, she invokes the help of the Genie of the Lamp, the protagonist of one of her stories, who takes Scheherazade to the modern world.

== Cast ==
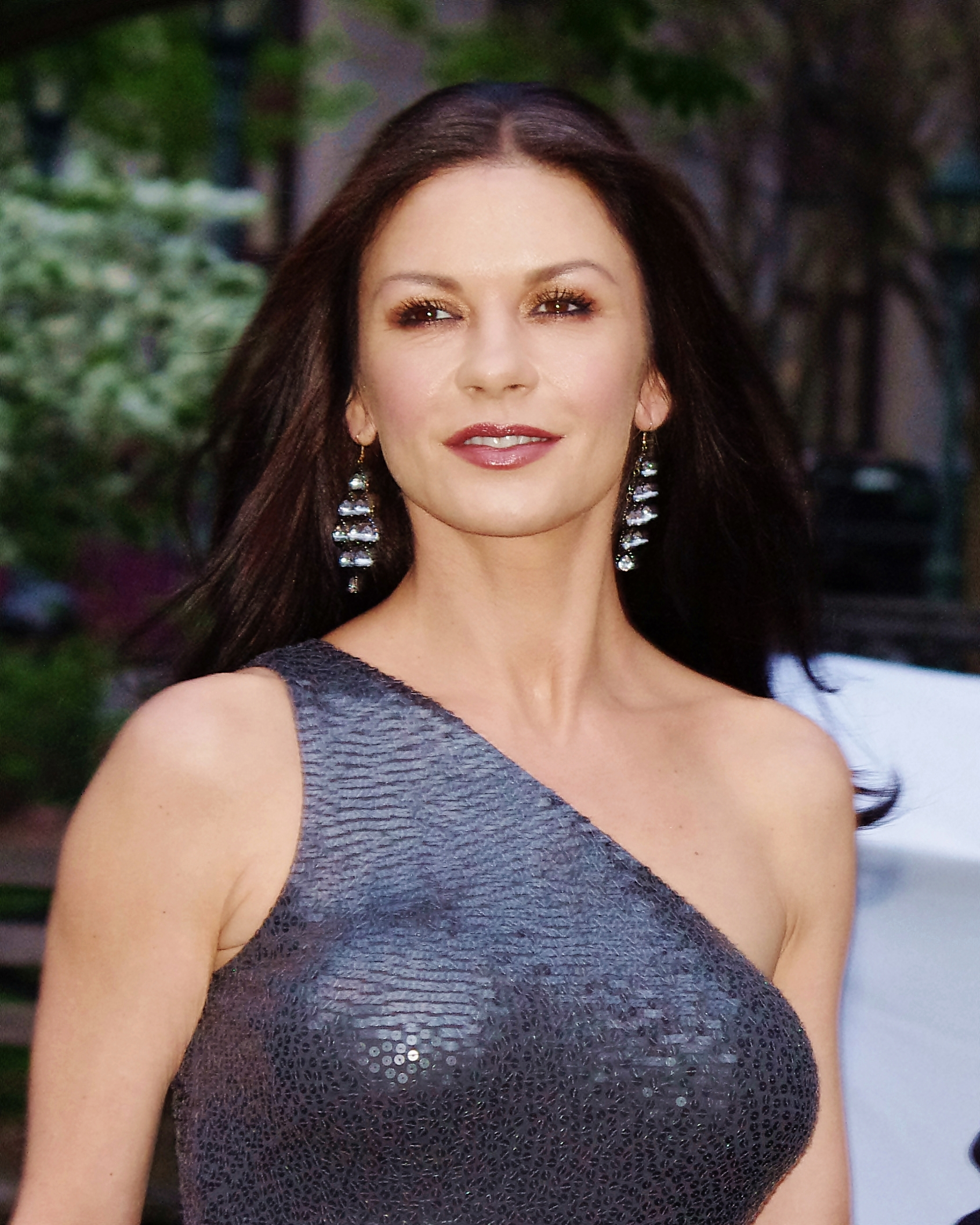
Catherine Zeta Jones (pictured in 2012) had her film debut in Les 1001 Nuits

- Thierry Lhermitte as The King
- Gérard Jugnot as Jimmy Genius
- Catherine Zeta-Jones as Scheherazade
- Stéphane Freiss as Aladdin
- Vittorio Gassman as Sindbad
- Roger Carel as The Grand Vizier

== Production ==
Production on Les 1001 Nuits began on April 17, 1989. The lead actress Catherine Zeta-Jones was performing at the West End theatre when she was spotted by Philippe de Broca who offered her the role in the film. The film was shot in France, Morocco, and Tunisia. Production ended on August 1, 1989.

== Release ==
The film was released in 1990. The film was released on VHS in 1990 in France.

This film was broadcast as a double telefilm on Antenne 2 in the early 1990s. The DVD version is the one released in the cinema, which is shortened and has fewer characters.

A 2 DVD edition of the film was released in 2004.

== Reception ==
=== Box office ===
In Paris, the film sold 29,340 tickets in its first week. At the end of its theatrical run in Paris, it sold 72,409 tickets. It sold a total of 254,739 tickets in France, where it was the 78th top-grossing film of 1990.

=== Critical response ===
In 2004, The Daily Telegraph stated the film received "little acclaim" and was remembered mostly for "its enjoyable nude scenes".
