= Rose Theatre Kingston =

Theatre in Kingston-upon-Thames, London, England

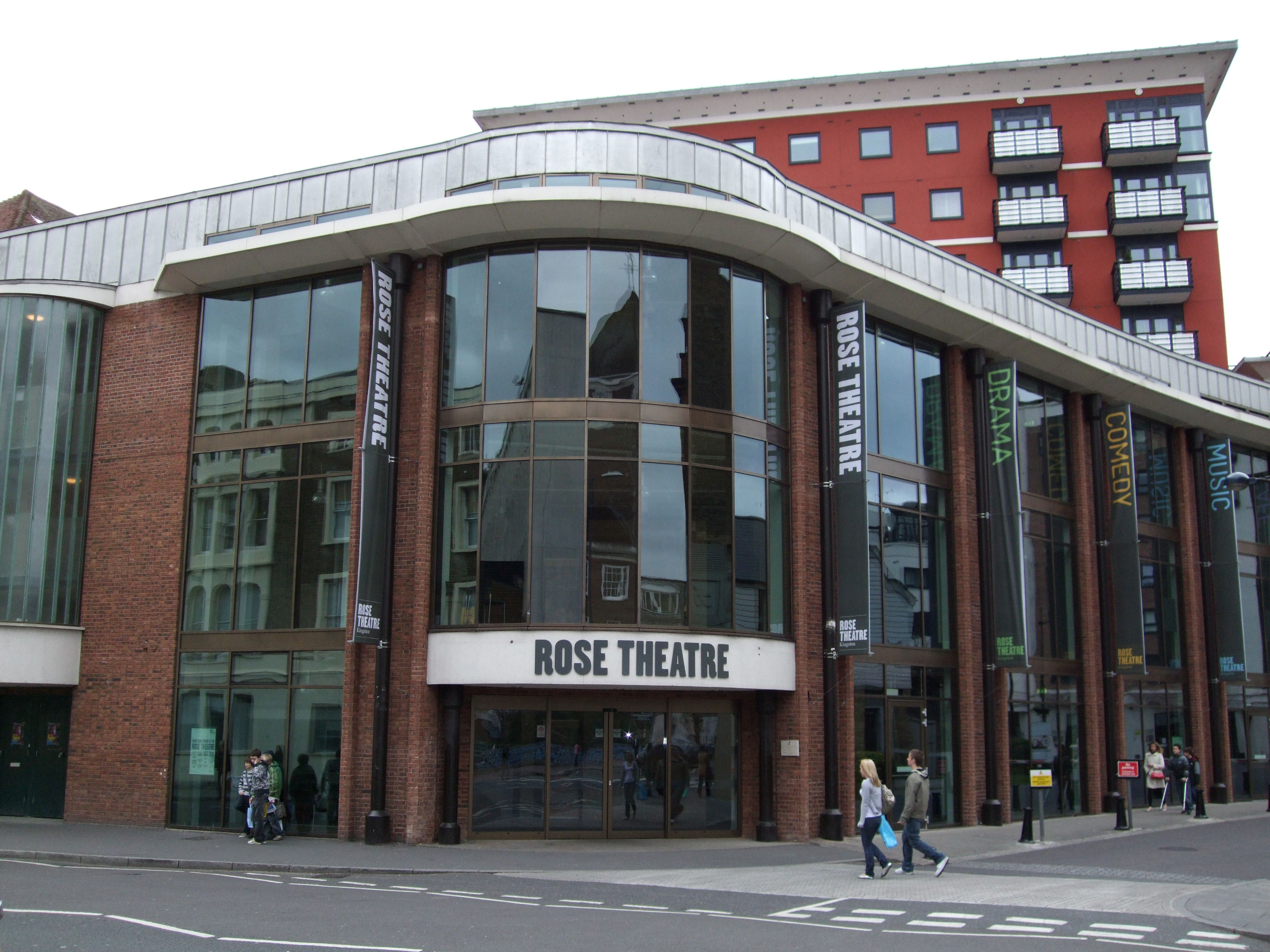
- The theatre in 2008
- Interactive map of Rose Theatre Kingston
- Address: 24–26 High Street
- Location: Kingston upon Thames, Greater London
- Coordinates: 51.4086°N 0.3075°W
- Owner: Kingston Theatre Trust
- Capacity: 822
- Type: Theatre
- Public transit: Kingston

Construction
- Opened: January 16, 2008

Website
- www.rosetheatre.org

The Rose Theatre Kingston is a theatre on Kingston High Street in the Royal Borough of Kingston upon Thames in London, England. The theatre seats 822 around a wide, thrust stage.

It officially opened on 16 January 2008 with the play Uncle Vanya written by Anton Chekhov and directed by Sir Peter Hall. Hall had also directed an "in the raw" production of As You Like It within the shell of the uncompleted building in December 2004.

== Design ==
The theatre's layout is based on that of the Rose Theatre in London, an Elizabethan theatre that staged the plays of Christopher Marlowe and early plays by Shakespeare. It features a shallow thrust stage. Unlike the original Rose, it makes the Elizabethan design more comfortable by adding a roof and modern seats, rather like the Swan Theatre in Stratford-upon-Avon. The auditorium has since been refurbished to include stall seating in the pit area – reaching a total number of 822 seats.

== History ==
The Rose was a project supported by Peter Hall and broadcaster David Jacobs CBE, who served as chairman of the Kingston Theatre Trust.

The construction was undertaken with £5m (of the £11m construction cost) support from the local council, involvement from Kingston University, Peter Hall, and the Friends of Kingston Theatre. The shell of the building was provided to the Trust for free by St George plc as one of the concessions for the construction of Charter Quay, a development on the bank of the Thames.

In January 2008, a week after the theatre opened, Hall resigned and it was announced that from April 2008, Stephen Unwin, departing director of English Touring Theatre would take over the role of artistic director, while Hall would remain as director emeritus.

On 25 November 2010, the Rose won an award for "Commitment to the Community," at the Kingston Business Awards. The same week, Sir Peter Hall won the Moscow Art Theatre Golden Seagull award for his contribution to World Theatre at the Evening Standard Awards.

The Rose is supported by the Royal Borough of Kingston and Kingston University. However, it receives no funding from Arts Council England.

== Rose Theatre productions ==
The Rose has staged an increasing number of home-grown productions. Some highlights include Love's Labour's Lost, directed by Sir Peter Hall; A Christmas Carol; Terence Rattigan's The Winslow Boy with Timothy West; Sir Peter Hall's revival of Alan Ayckbourn's Bedroom Farce with Jane Asher and Nicholas Le Prevost (which later transferred to the West End) in repertoire with Miss Julie; Treasure Island; Judi Dench in Sir Peter Hall's production of A Midsummer Night's Dream; Dumb Show by Joe Penhall; Noël Coward's Hay Fever with Celia Imrie; Three Musketeers; As You Like It; Jane Asher returned for Oscar Wilde's The Importance of Being Earnest performed in rep with the premiere of Harley Granville-Barker's Farewell to the Theatre; The Snow Queen; Joely Richardson in The Lady from the Sea; Alison Steadman in Michael Frayn's Here; and The Lion, The Witch and The Wardrobe.

=== 2018 ===
- Curtains
- Much Ado About Nothing, starring Mel Giedroyc as Beatrice and John Hopkins as Benedick
- Hogarth's Progress, starring Keith Allen and Bryan Dick
- Don Carlos, starring Tom Burke as The Marquis of Posa
- Hansel & Gretel

=== 2019 ===
- Zog
- Stones in his Pockets
- The Cat in the Hat
- Captain Corelli's Mandolin
- Valued Friends
- The Snow Queen

== Graduation ceremonies ==
Kingston University has held its graduation ceremonies at the Rose Theatre since 2010 (students completing their degree in 2009); they were, for many years, previously held at the Royal Albert Hall and in 2009, at the Royal Festival Hall.
