= Beatriz Enríquez de Arana =

Partner of Christopher Columbus

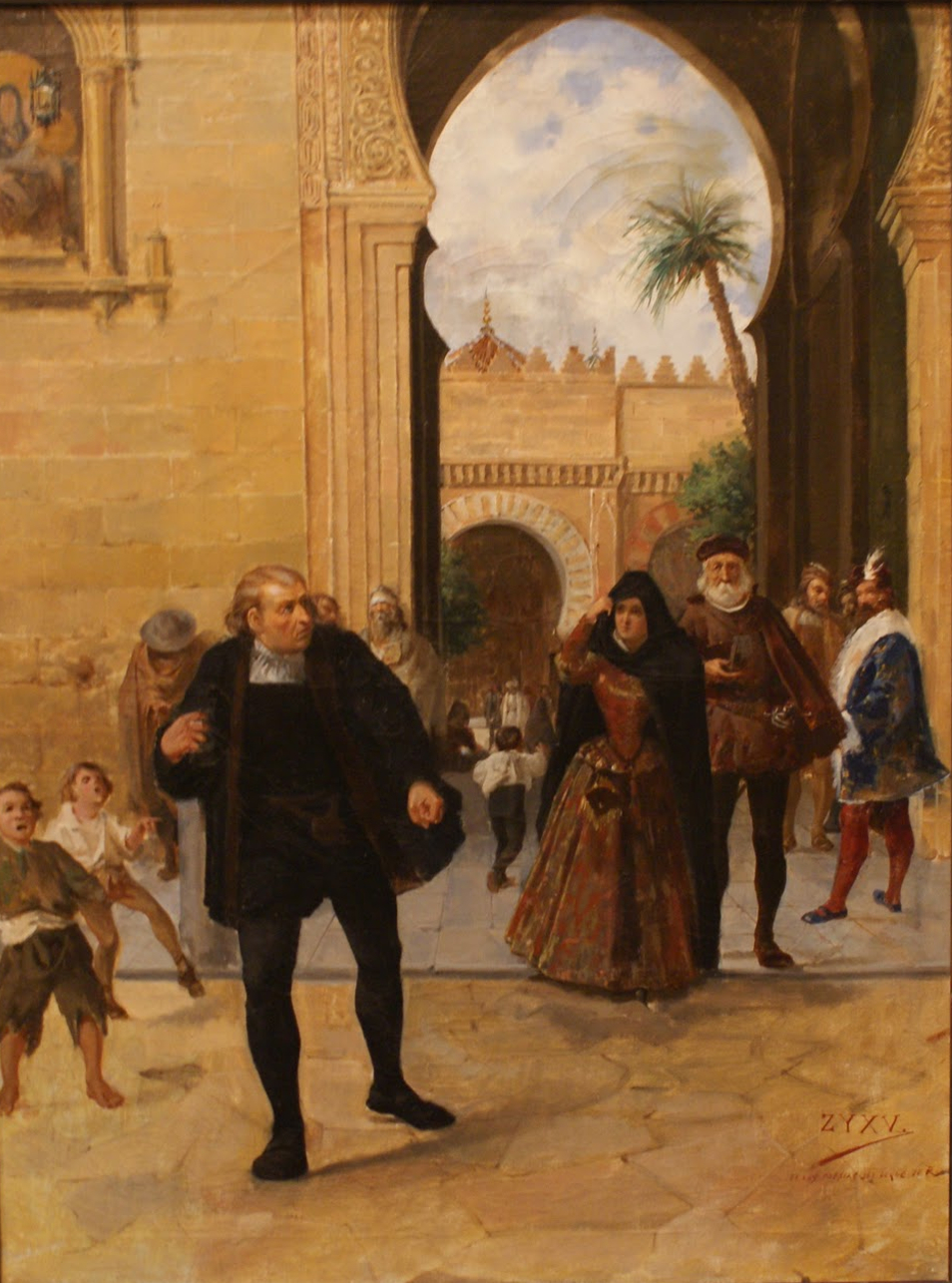
- The work represents Christopher Columbus leaving the Mosque-Cathedral of Córdoba.
- Born: Sometime between 1465 and 1470; Santa María de Trassierra, Córdoba, Crown of Castile
- Died: 1521 (aged 55–56); Santa María de Trassierra, Córdoba, Spain
- Partner(s): Christopher Columbus (as mistress (disputed); 1487 – his death 1506)
- Children: Ferdinand Columbus

Beatriz Enríquez de Arana (1465/70?–1521?) was the mother of Ferdinand Columbus, Christopher Columbus's younger son. The nature of her relationship to Christopher Columbus has been a subject of dispute amongst historians. Some evidence suggests that she was the second wife to Columbus. Columbus's own codicil of 1506, however, refers to her only as "the mother of his son, Ferdinand." Most historians conclude that the two never married. The Columbus family tree lists Ferdinand and Diego Columbus, Columbus's son from his first marriage, on the same branch, as Ferdinand was a "natural son" in accordance with the Siete Partidas, the law in effect at the time.

== Biography ==
Beatriz Enríquez de Arana is believed to have been born sometime between 1465 and 1470 in the village of Santa María de Trasierra. This would have made her 15 to 20 on January 20, 1485, the date generally given for when Columbus entered the service of the monarchs and the date referenced relative to her age by historian Ramírez de Arellano that allows us to calculate the range of years for her birth. She was the daughter of Pedro de Torquemada and Ana Núñez de Arana, farmers and owners of "a little orchard, a small wine press and two plots of vineyard, in poor, scrubby country. She had one brother, Pedro de Arana. Before her death, Ana was listed as being a "neighbor of the parish of San Pedro in the nearby city of Córdoba. Her father, Pedro de Torquemada, was a resident of the parish of San Miguel and buried at San Miguel parish church according to his will though the date of his death and time are unknown because "the will is so damaged that only a few lines can be read, and the date is among the parts destroye." Her mother died on June 2, 1471, most likely due to complications during childbirth, as stated by Ramírez de Arrellano.

On this same date of June 2, 1471, her mother executed a will that referenced "Pedro and Beatriz, her legitimate children." There was no custom or law in 15th-century Iberia causing named children in wills to be listed chronologically, alphabetically, or by gender, and Pedro's placement before Beatriz in the will lends no documentary evidence as to which child was older. Therefore, it is unknown as to whether Beatriz or Pedro was born first and which one was born or shortly before June 2, 1471. It is worth noting that Ramírez De Arellano's statement about Ana Núñez de Arana dying due to childbirth added that it was likely from Beatriz's birth. However, this would cause Ramírez De Arellano's two claims of Beatriz's age and the cause of her mother's death to be in conflict. If the claim by Ramírez De Arellano related to Ana's death being due to childbirth, specifically being Beatriz's birth and not Pedro's, then it dictates that Beatriz was 13 on January 20, 1485, and not 15 to 20 as claimed by Ramírez de Arellano, which corresponds to a birth between 1465 and 1470 and not 1471.

After the death of their mother, Beatriz and Pedro were placed under the guardianship of her grandmother, Eleanor Nunez, and her maternal aunt, Mayor Enriquez de Arana. Historians present conflicting views of her childhood with some saying she was "a bit flightly" and "a poor, half or wholly abandoned orphan, easily seduced," while others claim Beatriz received a good education and learned how to read and write, an exceptional accomplishment in an era when most women could not sign their names, though this latter inference is most likely due to a signature of hers on a notarial record, which is different than having the ability to read and write. After the death of their grandmother and aunt in 1478, the children were raised by their closest surviving relative, Rodrigo Enriquez de Arana.

Christopher Columbus met Beatriz Enríquez de Arana sometime between 1485 and 1487 while seeking support from the Catholic monarchs for his proposed voyage sailing westward to reach Cipango. Beatriz gave birth to Ferdinand Columbus on September 28, 1488, a date derived from his tombstone in the Cathedral of Seville, which records that he died on July 12, 1539, aged 50 years, 9 months and 14 days. That same year, Columbus sent his older son, Diego Columbus, to Córdoba to be raised by Beatriz and her family. During this time, Columbus was busy advocating for his proposed voyage and spent little time with his family. In 1494 both boys were sent to the royal court in Valladolid to serve as pages. Thereafter, Arana had little contact with the Columbus children, although Christopher provided her with a modest annuity after his first successful voyage in 1492.

Posthumous chromolithograph of Beatriz Enríquez de Arana

Some historians hypothesize that Christopher Columbus may have never married Beatriz Enríquez de Arana, possibly because of the strict social barriers that existed at the time between a nobleman and a common peasant. This is especially unfortunate for Beatriz as Columbus gained access to the Portuguese court of King John II through the nobility status of his first wife, Filipa Moniz Perestrelo.

From 1493 to 1506, the year of Columbus's death, Beatriz collected the 10,000 Maravedis a year juro for Columbus claiming he sighted land first on the 1492 voyage and that was transferred to Beatriz on May 23, 1493. This amount was, as was typical of the day, not paid out of a central treasury, but to be taken from a source of royal revenue, in which the holder of the juro, or an agent on their behalf, collected the money from whoever gathered the tax. In this case, the 10,000 a year juro was attached to revenue from butcher shops in Córdoba, which leads historians to hypothesize that Beatriz had residence there during this time period. Columbus was on voyages or at the royal court for much of these years and it is unknown as to whether their relationship continued during these years or not.

When Columbus died he left some provision for her in his will, directing his son Diego to hold her in respect and continue an annual allowance. Diego appears to have been remiss with payments; Beatriz' last recorded act in 1521 was hiring an attorney to collect some money, and Diego's will written in 1523 contained a directive that any unpaid monies from the last three or four years were to be paid out to Beatriz' heirs.

Neither her cause of death, nor the exact date has been recorded, but it is assumed to have taken place shortly after 1521.

Other members of the Arana family were also associated with Columbus. On his first voyage in 1492, Diego de Arana, a cousin to Beatriz, served Columbus as chief marshal of the fleet, responsible for maintaining order among the sailors. Pedro de Arana, brother to Beatriz, was captain of one of the ships during Columbus's third voyage.
