= Dramatic Need =

- Logo
- Founded: 2005
- Dissolved: 2021
- Type: Non-profit charity
- Registration no.: 1119443
- Locations: United Kingdom; Ireland
- Region served: South Africa; Rwanda
- Method: Creative arts education; Volunteer
- Key people: Danny Boyle (trustee); Sir Antony Sher (former trustee)
- Website: archived website

Dramatic Need was a UK-registered charity established in 2007 that sent international arts professionals to host workshops in underprivileged and rural communities in Rwanda and South Africa. The charity promoted creative expression as a tool for conflict resolution, social development, gender empowerment, and the assimilation of health messages in underprivileged communities.

Dramatic Need was dissolved in 2021.

== History ==
The charity was officially registered in the UK on 31 May 2007 (number 1119443), with Danny Boyle as founding trustee.

The official patron of Dramatic Need was Lindiwe Mabuza, former South African High Commissioner to the UK. The board of trustees included the Oscar-winning film director Danny Boyle, and previously included the South African-born actor Antony Sher.

Dramatic Need was wound up on 15 November 2021.

== Aims and work ==
In an article for The Times on 11 November 2008, trustee Danny Boyle described the aims of Dramatic Need:

For children - and for many adults - art plays a vital role in helping them to express feelings and difficulties that they aren't otherwise able to articulate. Its importance is never greater than in post-conflict conditions. Of course, water, food, and first aid are essential during a crisis, but none of these things can restore human dignity to a person dying from disease or help a rape victim to cope with their outrage. To suggest that the only things that maintain our humanity are those that serve our biological needs seems to me palpably incorrect. We are not just what we eat. We are also what we feel, what we fear, what we love and what we hate. Unexpressed tensions find their strength in violence....If there is not a means to move beyond the hatred of the past, we will never move past violence.

The charity sent international arts professionals (such as musicians, artists and actors) to host workshops in underprivileged and rural communities in Africa, specifically Rwanda and South Africa.

Dramatic Need provided art, music, and film-making equipment to schools in South Africa and Rwanda. Volunteers on the Dramatic Need programme worked with the children towards producing a performance or exhibition based on the issues that directly affected their communities. The charity was particularly effective in encouraging young people to discuss and challenge the stigma surrounding HIV/AIDS.

== Support and fund-raising ==
Significant supporters of the charity included Josh Hartnett, Helena Christensen and David Walliams.

=== The Children's Monologues ===
On 14 November 2010, the first production of The Children's Monologues, directed by Danny Boyle, was performed at the Old Vic Theatre in London, in association with Dramatic Need. it featured the adapted stories of children's first-hand experiences in South Africa being retold and re-interpreted by and performed by actors such as Sir Ben Kingsley, Benedict Cumberbatch, Tom Hiddleston, Gemma Arterton, and Eddie Redmayne.

Boyle co-directed another performance of the play in 2015 at the Royal Court Theatre, and again in 2017 at Carnegie Hall in New York City.

== See also ==
- The Children's Monologues
