= Herc-Xenaverse =

Television franchise

- A poster for Hercules and the Amazon Women, the first entry in the Herc-Xenaverse.
- Original work: Hercules and the Amazon Women (1994)
- Years: 1994–2019

Print publications
- Comics: Xena: Warrior Princess

Films and television
- Film(s): Hercules and the Amazon Women; Hercules and the Lost Kingdom; Hercules and the Circle of Fire; Hercules in the Underworld; Hercules in the Maze of the Minotaur; Young Hercules; Hercules and Xena – The Animated Movie: The Battle for Mount Olympus
- Television series: Hercules: The Legendary Journeys; Xena: Warrior Princess; Young Hercules

Games
- Traditional: Hercules & Xena Roleplaying Game
- Video game(s): Xena: Warrior Princess; Xena: Warrior Princess: The Talisman of Fate; Hercules: The Legendary Journeys

The Herc-Xenaverse is a television franchise created by Sam Raimi, including the series Hercules: The Legendary Journeys, Xena: Warrior Princess, and Young Hercules. It also includes the wider intertextual and multimedia coverage of the franchise by academic writers, media professionals and enthusiasts.

== Films ==
Film	U.S. release date	Director	Screenwriter(s)	Story by	Producer(s)
Hercules and the Amazon Women	April 25, 1994	Bill L. Norton	Andrew Dettmann, Jule Selbo and Daniel Truly	Andrew Dettmann, Jule Selbo and Daniel Truly	Eric Gruendemann, Sam Raimi, Rob Tapert, Christian Williams, David Eick, and Bernadette Joyce
Hercules and the Lost Kingdom	May 2, 1994	Harley Cokeliss	Christian Williams	Christian Williams	Eric Gruendemann, Sam Raimi, Rob Tapert, Christian Williams, David Eick, and Bernadette Joyce
Hercules and the Circle of Fire	October 31, 1994	Doug Lefler	Andrew Dettmann, Barry Pullman, and Daniel Truly	Andrew Dettmann, Barry Pullman, and Daniel Truly	Eric Gruendemann, Sam Raimi, Rob Tapert, Christian Williams, David Eick, and Bernadette Joyce
Hercules in the Underworld	November 7, 1994	Bill L. Norton	Andrew Dettmann and Daniel Truly	Andrew Dettmann and Daniel Truly	Eric Gruendemann, Sam Raimi, Rob Tapert, Christian Williams, David Eick, and Bernadette Joyce
Hercules in the Maze of the Minotaur	November 14, 1994	Josh Becker	Andrew Dettmann and Daniel Truly	Andrew Dettmann and Daniel Truly	Eric Gruendemann, Sam Raimi, Rob Tapert, Christian Williams, David Eick, and Bernadette Joyce
Hercules and Xena – The Animated Movie: The Battle for Mount Olympus	January 6, 1998	Lynne Naylor	John Loy	John Loy	Lynne Naylor, Sam Raimi, and Rob Tapert
Young Hercules	August 30, 1998	T. J. Scott	Andrew Dettmann and Daniel Truly	Rob Tapert, Andrew Dettmann, and Daniel Truly	Liz Friedman, Eric Gruendemann, Sam Raimi, Rob Tapert, and Bernadette Joyce

=== Hercules and the Amazon Women (1994) ===
Hercules and the Amazon Women is the first Herc-Xenaverse film.

=== Hercules and the Lost Kingdom (1994) ===
Hercules and the Lost Kingdom is the second Herc-Xenaverse film.

=== Hercules and the Circle of Fire (1994) ===
Hercules and the Circle of Fire is the third Herc-Xenaverse film.

=== Hercules in the Underworld (1994) ===
Hercules in the Underworld is the fourth Herc-Xenaverse film.

=== Hercules in the Maze of the Minotaur (1994) ===
Hercules in the Maze of the Minotaur is the fifth Herc-Xenaverse film.

=== Hercules and Xena – The Animated Movie: The Battle for Mount Olympus (1998) ===
Hercules and Xena – The Animated Movie: The Battle for Mount Olympus is the sixth Herc-Xenaverse film.

=== Young Hercules (1998) ===
Young Hercules is the seventh Herc-Xenaverse film.

== Television series ==
Three television series make up the Herc-Xenaverse franchise: Hercules: The Legendary Journeys, Xena: Warrior Princess, and Young Hercules. All series in total amount to 295 episodes across 13 seasons of television.

Series	Season	Episodes	Originally released		Status
Series	Season	Episodes	First released	Last released	Status
Hercules: The Legendary Journeys	1	13	January 16, 1995	May 8, 1995	Concluded
Hercules: The Legendary Journeys	2	24	September 4, 1995	June 24, 1996	Concluded
Hercules: The Legendary Journeys	3	22	September 30, 1996	May 12, 1997	Concluded
Hercules: The Legendary Journeys	4	22	September 29, 1997	May 11, 1998	Concluded
Hercules: The Legendary Journeys	5	22	September 28, 1998	May 17, 1999	Concluded
Hercules: The Legendary Journeys	6	8	September 27, 1999	November 22, 1999	Concluded
Xena: Warrior Princess	1	24	September 4, 1995	July 29, 1996	Concluded
Xena: Warrior Princess	2	22	October 12, 1996	May 10, 1997	Concluded
Xena: Warrior Princess	3	22	September 27, 1997	May 16, 1998	Concluded
Xena: Warrior Princess	4	22	October 3, 1998	May 22, 1999	Concluded
Xena: Warrior Princess	5	22	October 2, 1999	May 20, 2000	Concluded
Xena: Warrior Princess	6	22	October 7, 2000	June 18, 2001	Concluded
Young Hercules	1	50	September 12, 1998	May 14, 1999	Concluded

=== Hercules: The Legendary Journeys (1995 – 1999) ===
Hercules: The Legendary Journeys is the first Herc-Xenaverse series.

=== Xena: Warrior Princess (1995 – 2001) ===
Xena: Warrior Princess is the second Herc-Xenaverse series.

=== Young Hercules (1998 – 1999) ===
Young Hercules is the third Herc-Xenaverse series.

== Cast and characters ==
List indicators

This section includes characters who will appear or have appeared in two or more releases in the franchise.

- An empty grey cell indicates the character was not in the film, or that the character's official presence has not yet been confirmed.
- ^{V} indicates a voice-only role.
- ^{Y} indicates a younger version of the character.

Cast and characters of Herc-Xenaverse media
Character	Films					Television series		Films		Television series
Character	Hercules and the Amazon Women	Hercules and the Lost Kingdom	Hercules and the Circle of Fire	Hercules in the Underworld	Hercules in the Maze of the Minotaur	Hercules: The Legendary Journeys	Xena: Warrior Princess	Hercules and Xena – The Animated Movie: The Battle for Mount Olympus	Young Hercules	Young Hercules
Character	1994					1995 – 1999	1995 – 2001	1998		1998 – 1999
Hercules	Kevin Sorbo	Kevin Sorbo	Kevin Sorbo	Kevin Sorbo	Kevin Sorbo	Kevin Sorbo Ian Bohen^{Y}	Kevin Sorbo	Kevin Sorbo^{V}	Ian Bohen^{Y}	Ryan Gosling^{Y}
Iolaus	Michael Hurst				Michael Hurst	Michael Hurst Dean O'Gorman^{Y}	Michael Hurst	Michael Hurst^{V}	Dean O'Gorman^{Y}	Dean O'Gorman^{Y}
Zeus	Anthony Quinn	Anthony Quinn	Anthony Quinn	Anthony Quinn	Anthony Quinn	Peter Vere-Jones Charles Keating	Charles Keating	Peter Rowley^{V}		John Bach
Hades					Mark Ferguson	Erik Thomson	Erik Thomson Stephen Lovatt			Erik Thomson
Autolycus						Bruce Campbell	Bruce Campbell			
Julius Caesar						Karl Urban	Karl Urban			
Crius						Edward Campbell		Ted Raimi^{V} Roger Freeland^{V}		
Cupid						Karl Urban	Karl Urban			
Xena						Lucy Lawless	Lucy Lawless	Lucy Lawless^{V}		
Gabrielle						Renee O'Connor	Renee O'Connor	Renee O'Connor^{V}		
