= List of fictional shared universes in film and television =

This is a list of fictional shared universes in film and television.

== Film ==
This is a list of shared universes in film. There are different definitions of shared universe. It is a requirement that two or more previously unconnected characters come together into one film.

Universe	Origin film	Start date	End date	Connecting characters
Universal Monsters	Dracula	1931	Present	Frankenstein's monster, Larry Talbot, the Wolf Man.
Miyagi-verse	The Karate Kid	1984	Present	Mr. Han and Daniel LaRusso
Realer Than Real World Universe	Reservoir Dogs	1992	Present	The Vega Brothers
The Movie Movie Universe	From Dusk till Dawn	1996	2004	Earl & Edgar McGraw
Eastrail 177 Trilogy (Unbreakable Trilogy)	Unbreakable	2000	2019	David Dunn, Kevin Wendell Crumb and Mr. Glass
Alien vs. Predator	Alien vs. Predator	2004	2007	Xenomorphs and Predators
Marvel Cinematic Universe	Iron Man	2008	Present	Numerous
DC Extended Universe	Man of Steel	2013	2023	Numerous
Monsterverse	Godzilla	2014	Present	Godzilla and King Kong
Sony's Spider-Man Universe	Venom	2018	2024	Venom, Morbius, and Madame Web
DC Universe	Superman	2025	Present	

=== Common origin ===
Some definitions of a shared universe allow a single original work if later works can be split into loosely connected groups with different characters, sometimes sharing an overall continuity.

Universe	Origin film	Start date	End date	Connecting franchises
Rocky	Rocky	1976	Present	Rocky & Creed
Star Wars	Star Wars	1977	Present	Star Wars, Rogue One and Solo
The Mummy	The Mummy	1999	Present	The Mummy and The Scorpion King
X-Men	X-Men	2000	2024	X-Men, Wolverine, Deadpool, and New Mutants
Fast & Furious	The Fast and the Furious	2001	Present	Fast & Furious, Hobbs & Shaw, and Better Luck Tomorrow
Cars	Cars	2006	Present	Cars and Planes
Despicable Me	Despicable Me	2010	Present	Despicable Me films and Minions films
The Conjuring Universe	The Conjuring	2013	Present	The Conjuring, Annabelle, Wolves at the Door, The Nun and The Curse of La Llorona
The Lego Movie	The Lego Movie	2014	Present	The Lego Movie, The Lego Batman Movie, The Lego Ninjago Movie, and The Lego Movie 2: The Second Part

== Television ==
This is a partial list of fictional universes created for television.

Universe	Origin / First mentioned	Date	Notes
Avatar universe	Avatar: The Last Airbender	2005–2014	Characters appearing in both shows include Katara, Zuko, Toph, Sokka, and Aang.
Guiding Light and Other Series	Guiding Light (1952)	1952–present	Guiding Light and spin-off Our Private World, Search for Tomorrow, As the World Turns, Another World, Somerset, Texas, Lovers and Friends, Days of Our Lives, The Young and the Restless, Evil, and The Bold and the Beautiful.
The Muppets universe	Sam and Friends	1955–present	An ensemble cast of puppet characters that appear in multiple tv shows, movies, specials, and many more. This category includes Sam and Friends, The Muppet Show, Sesame Street, Fraggle Rock, Big Bag, Between The Lions, and Mecha Builders
The Beverly Hillbillies, Petticoat Junction, and Green Acres	The Beverly Hillbillies (1962)	1962–1971	A fictional universe created by Paul Henning where all the main characters come from rural places. Also includes Mister Ed.
Whoniverse	Doctor Who (1963–2025)	1963–present	Doctor Who, Torchwood, The Sarah Jane Adventures, K-9, Class and related media.
Dexter	Dexter (2006–2013)	2006–present	Dexter, Dexter: New Blood, Dexter: Original Sin and Dexter: Resurrection
Heroes	Heroes (2006–2010)	2006–present	Heroes and Heroes Reborn
Game of Thrones	Game of Thrones (2011–2019)	2011–present	Game of Thrones, House of the Dragon and A Knight of the Seven Kingdoms
Sons of Anarchy	Sons of Anarchy (2008–2014)	2006–2023	Sons of Anarchy and Mayans M.C.
Batman, Green Hornet, Adventures of Superman, Legends of the Superheroes, and Wonder Woman	Superman and the Mole Men (1951)	1951–1979	Also includes 1966 film Batman.
Star Trek Universe	Star Trek (1966–1969)	1966–present	Series created by Gene Roddenberry, continued by Harve Bennett, Rick Berman, J. J. Abrams and Alex Kurtzman. To date comprises 12 television series and 13 feature films.
Ultra Series	Ultra Q	1966	The collective name for all the shows produced by Tsuburaya Productions featuring Ultraman.
The Mary Tyler Moore Show, Rhoda, Phyllis and Lou Grant	The Mary Tyler Moore Show (1970–1977)	1970–1982	
Cannon and Barnaby Jones	Cannon	1971–1980	
Toei Tokusatsu Universe	Kamen Rider (1971)	1971–present	Kamen Rider, Kikaider, Inazuman, Super Sentai, Kaiketsu Zubat and Metal Hero.
Norman Lear, Tyler Perry, Quincy Jones series and others	All in the Family	1971–present	All in the Family, The Jeffersons, The Fresh Prince of Bel-Air, Madea film series, Tyler Perry's House of Payne, Love Thy Neighbor, The Paynes, Meet the Browns, Maude, Good Times, Mr. Dugan, Hanging In, Archie Bunker's Place, 704 Hauser, Checking In, Gloria, Blossom, Out All Night, In the House, Diff'rent Strokes, The Facts of Life, Silver Spoons, and Hello, Larry (A part of The Tommy Westphall Universe)
Magnum, P.I. and Other Series	Magnum, P.I. (1980)	1980–1996	Magnum, P.I., Simon & Simon, Whiz Kids, Murder, She Wrote, and The Law & Harry McGraw.
Cheers and Other Series	Cheers	1982–2024	Cheers, Wings, Frasier, The Tortellis, The John Larroquette Show, Seinfeld, Mad About You, Friends, Joey, Style & Substance, Caroline in the City, The Single Guy, Madman of the People and Frasier (2023 reboot series). Series of interconnected sitcoms all airing on US network NBC. Caroline in the City crossed over with both Frasier and Friends, tying the universes together. Cheers also crossed over with St. Elsewhere, tying it to the Tommy Westphall universe.
Wolf Entertainment Universe	St. Elsewhere (1982)	1982–present	Law & Order Franchise (Law & Order, Exiled: A Law & Order Movie, Law & Order: Special Victims Unit, Law & Order: Criminal Intent, Law & Order: Trial by Jury, Law & Order: LA, and Law & Order: Organized Crime), Homicide: Life on the Street, St. Elsewhere, Andy Barker, P.I., New York Undercover, Deadline, Conviction, In Plain Sight, Jo, the Chicago franchise (Chicago Fire, Chicago P.D., Chicago Med and Chicago Justice), and the FBI franchise (FBI, FBI: Most Wanted, and FBI: International). Law & Order debuted in 1990, but its inclusion of John Munch connected it to Homicide: Life on the Street, which in turn connected it to the earlier show, St. Elsewhere, and thus the Tommy Westphall Universe. Munch also connects it to the X-Files universe, The Beat, Arrested Development, and The Wire.
The Cosby Show and A Different World	The Cosby Show	1984–1993	
The Golden Girls, Empty Nest, Nurses and The Golden Palace	The Golden Girls	1985–1995	
ABC sitcoms	Perfect Strangers	1986–2020	Full House and sequel Fuller House, Perfect Strangers and spin-off Family Matters, Step by Step, Hangin' with Mr. Cooper, Sabrina the Teenage Witch, You Wish, Teen Angel, Meego, Boy Meets World and spin-off/sequel Girl Meets World, Clueless, Moesha, The Parkers, Girlfriends, and The Game. Ties into the Disney Channel sitcom universe through Girl Meets World.
Nickelodeon's Klasky Csupo Universe	Rugrats	1991– 2008	Rugrats, All Grown Up!, Angelica and Susie's Pre-School Daze, Aaahh!!! Real Monsters, The Wild Thornberrys, Rocket Power, and As Told by Ginger.
DC Animated Universe	Batman: The Animated Series	1992–2019	Includes home video entries, last Television entry was Justice League Unlimited which ended in 2006, and last home video entry was Justice League vs. the Fatal Five which ended in 2019.
Marvel Animated Universe	X-Men (1992)	1992–present	X-Men, Spider-Man, and X-Men '97.
Walker, Texas Ranger, Sons of Thunder, Martial Law, Chicago Hope, Picket Fences, and Early Edition	Picket Fences	1992–2001	Dr. Jeffrey Geiger appeared in Homicide: Life on the Street, tying it to the Law and Order universe, and the Tommy Westphall Universe.
Hill Street Blues and Other Series	Hill Street Blues	1981–2008	Hill Street Blues, Beverly Hills Buntz, Cop Rock, L.A. Law, Civil Wars, NYPD Blue, Public Morals, The Practice, Ally McBeal, Brooklyn South, Gideon's Crossing, Boston Public, Boston Legal, Miss Match, and Snoops.
Beavis and Butt-Head and Daria	Beavis and Butt-Head	1993–present	
The X-Files Universe	The X-Files	1993–present	The X-Files, Millennium, and The Lone Gunmen. Featured a cameo by Det. John Munch, tying it to the Law & Order universe, and the Tommy Westphall universe.
Power Rangers Universe	Power Rangers	1993–present	Power Rangers (Has a multiverse with three confirmed universes; Power Rangers Dino Charge and Power Rangers RPM take place in separate universes as confirmed by the 25th anniversary special Dimensions in Danger), Masked Rider, and Ninja Turtles: The Next Mutation.
Everybody Loves Raymond, The King of Queens, Becker, The Simple Life, Cosby, and The Nanny	The Nanny	1993–2007	
The Lion King, Timon and Pumbaa and The Lion Guard	The Lion King	1994–2019	Not counting the 2019 remake of The Lion King.
ER, Third Watch, and Medical Investigation	ER	1994–2009	
Stargate	Stargate	1994–2018	Stargate (film), Stargate SG-1, Stargate Atlantis, Stargate Universe and Stargate Origins.
Herc-Xenaverse	Hercules and the Amazon Women	1994–2001	Hercules and the Lost Kingdom, Hercules and the Circle of Fire, Hercules in the Underworld, Hercules in the Maze of the Minotaur, Hercules: The Legendary Journeys, Xena: Warrior Princess, Young Hercules and Hercules and Xena – The Animated Movie: The Battle for Mount Olympus
JAG and Other Series (AKA the "Bellisarioverse")	JAG	1995–present	JAG, First Monday, the NCIS franchise (NCIS, NCIS: Los Angeles, NCIS: New Orleans, NCIS: Hawai'i, NCIS: Sydney, NCIS: Origins and NCIS: Tony & Ziva), the Lenkov-verse (Hawaii Five-0, MacGyver, and Magnum P.I.) Scorpion
The Pretender and Profiler	The Pretender	1996–2000	
Buffyverse	Buffy the Vampire Slayer	1997–present	Buffy the Vampire Slayer, Angel, and related media.
Dawson's Creek and Young Americans	Dawson's Creek	1998–2003	
Billionfold Inc. Universe	The Fairly OddParents	1998–2018	Oh Yeah! Cartoons, The Fairly OddParents, Danny Phantom, T.U.F.F. Puppy and Bunsen Is a Beast
Crossing Jordan and Las Vegas	Crossing Jordan	2001–2008	
Dora Universe	Dora the Explorer	2000–present	Dora the Explorer, Go, Diego, Go! and Dora and Friends
Tripperverse	Man About the House	1973–1981	Man About the House, George and Mildred and Robin's Nest
Up Pompeii Universe	Up Pompeii	1969–1991	Up Pompeii (television series and film), Up the Chastity Belt, Up the Front, Whoops Baghdad, Further Up Pompeii (1975), A Touch of the Casanovas, Then Churchill Said to Me and Further Up Pompeii (1991)
CSI franchise, Without a Trace and Cold Case	CSI: Crime Scene Investigation	2000–present	
Disney Channel sitcoms	That's So Raven	2003–present	That's So Raven and spin-offs Cory in the House and Raven's Home, The Suite Life of Zack & Cody and spin-off The Suite Life on Deck, Hannah Montana, Wizards of Waverly Place and spin-off Wizards Beyond Waverly Place, Aaron Stone, I'm in the Band, A.N.T. Farm, Jessie and spinoff Bunk'd, Austin & Ally, Good Luck Charlie, Shake It Up, Liv and Maddie, Best Friends Whenever, I Didn't Do It, K.C. Undercover, Crash & Bernstein, Saturdays, and Vampirina: Teenage Vampire.
One Tree Hill and Life Unexpected	One Tree Hill	2003–2012	
Chouseishin Series	Chouseishin Gransazer	2003–2006	Gransazer, Justirisers, Sazer-X and Sazer-X the Movie.
The Librarian	The Librarian: Quest for the Spear	2004–present	
Nickelodeon Sitcom Universe	Drake & Josh	2004–present	Drake & Josh, Unfabulous, Zoey 101, iCarly, iCarly 2021 revival, Victorious, Game Shakers, Sam & Cat, Henry Danger and spinoff Danger Force, The Thundermans, The Haunted Hathaways, That Girl Lay Lay, Tyler Perry's Young Dylan, Side Hustle, Warped!, Knight Squad, and Ryan's Mystery Playdate.
Shondaland Universe	Grey's Anatomy	2005–Present	Grey's Anatomy, Private Practice, and Station 19
Ben 10 universe	Ben 10	2005–Present	In Ben 10: Omniverse, it is retroactively established that Ben 10 and The Secret Saturdays are set in the same universe.
The Big Bang Theory	The Big Bang Theory	2007–Present	The Big Bang Theory, Young Sheldon, Georgie & Mandy's First Marriage, and Stuart Fails to Save the Universe".
Prison Break and Breakout Kings	Prison Break	2005–2017	
Bones, The Finder, Sleepy Hollow and Rosewood	Bones	2005–2017	
My Name Is Earl and Raising Hope	My Name Is Earl	2005–2014	
Eureka, Warehouse 13 and Alphas	Eureka	2006–2014	
Flashpoint and The Listener	Flashpoint	2008–2014	
Breaking Bad and Better Call Saul	Breaking Bad	2008–2022	Also includes El Camino: A Breaking Bad Movie.
The Vampire Diaries Universe	The Vampire Diaries	2009–present	The Vampire Diaries, The Originals, and Legacies.
Pretty Little Liars	Pretty Little Liars	2010–present	Pretty Little Liars, Ravenswood, Pretty Little Liars: The Perfectionists, and Pretty Little Liars: Original Sin
The Walking Dead TV universe	The Walking Dead	2010–present	The Walking Dead, Fear the Walking Dead, The Walking Dead: World Beyond, Tales of the Walking Dead, The Walking Dead: Dead City, and The Walking Dead: Daryl Dixon.
Once Upon a Time Universe	Once Upon a Time	2011–2018	Once Upon a Time and Once Upon a Time in Wonderland
American Horror Story	American Horror Story: Murder House	2011–present	
How to Get Away with a Scandal	How to Get Away with Murder	2016–2020	How to Get Away with Murder and Scandal.
Arrowverse	Arrow	2012–2024	Arrow, The Flash, Vixen, Supergirl, Legends of Tomorrow, Freedom Fighters: The Ray, Batwoman, Black Lightning and Superman & Lois. Adjacent Series: Batman (1966), Batman (1989 film), Smallville, Birds of Prey (TV Series), Constantine (TV series), The Flash (1990 TV series), Superman Returns, Green Lantern (2011), Lucifer, Titans, Doom Patrol, Stargirl, DC Extended Universe, and Swamp Thing
SpongeBob Universe	SpongeBob SquarePants	1999–present	SpongeBob SquarePants, Kamp Koral: SpongeBob's Under Years, The Patrick Star Show and Big Time Rush. Big Time Rush also connects it to Yo Gabba Gabba!, How to Rock, and Marvin Marvin.
Lab Rats, Kirby Buckets, Mighty Med and Lab Rats: Elite Force	Lab Rats	2012–2016	
Orange Is the New Black and Unbreakable Kimmy Schmidt	Orange Is the New Black	2013–2020	
Marvel Cinematic Universe's Television series produced by Marvel Television	Agents of S.H.I.E.L.D.	2013–2020	Agents of S.H.I.E.L.D., Agent Carter, Daredevil, Jessica Jones, Luke Cage, Iron Fist, The Defenders, Inhumans, The Punisher, Runaways, Cloak & Dagger, and Helstrom
Marvel Cinematic Universe's Television series produced by Marvel Studios	WandaVision	2021–present	WandaVision, The Falcon and the Winter Soldier, Loki, What If...?, Hawkeye, The Falcon and the Winter Soldier, Ms. Marvel, Moon Knight, She-Hulk: Attorney at Law, Secret Invasion, I am Groot, Agatha All Along, Echo, Daredevil: Born Again, Ironheart, Your Friendly Neighborhood Spider-Man, Eyes of Wakanda, Marvel Zombies, and Wonder Man
Riverdale Universe	Riverdale	2017–2023	Riverdale, Chilling Adventures of Sabrina, Katy Keene and Pretty Little Liars: Original Sin
Cartoon Network Universe	Dexter's Laboratory	1996–present	Dexter's Laboratory, Cow and Chicken, I Am Weasel, Johnny Bravo, Mike Lu and Og, Courage the Cowardly Dog, Sheep in the Big City, Time Squad, Grim & Evil franchise, Whatever Happened to... Robot Jones?, Ed, Edd n Eddy, Foster's Home for Imaginary Friends, The Life and Times of Juniper Lee, My Gym Partner's a Monkey, Camp Lazlo, Squirrel Boy, and Codename: Kids Next Door
Jay Ward Universe	Crusader Rabbit	1950–present	Crusader Rabbit, Rocky and Bullwinkle, Dudley Do-Right, Mr. Peabody and Sherman, Hoppity Hooper, George of the Jungle, Tom Slick, Super Chicken, Fractured Fairy Tales, and Aesop and Son
Yu-Gi-Oh! Duel Monsters, Yu-Gi-Oh! GX and Yu-Gi-Oh! 5D's	Yu-Gi-Oh!	2000– 2011	All the other shows following 5Ds take place in their own standalone universes/continuities.
The Tommy Westphall Universe	St. Elsewhere	1982–present	
Chespirito Media Universe	Sin Querer Queriendo	2025–present	Sin Querer Queriendo, Los Colorado and Untitled animated El Chavo series.
Regular Show and Close Enough	Regular Show	2010–present	
New Girl and Brooklyn Nine-Nine	Brooklyn Nine-Nine	2011–2021	
Cloud 9 Universe	The Mindy Project	2012–2021	The Mindy Project, Superstore, I Feel Bad and Good Girls.
Mission: Impossible and Other Series	Mission: Impossible (1966)	1966–1975; 1986–2003	Mission: Impossible (1966 TV series), Mannix, Matlock, Jake and the Fatman, Diagnosis: Murder, Mission: Impossible (1988 TV series), Touched by an Angel and Promised Land. Also includes Mission: Impossible vs. the Mob.
Marvel Action Hour	Iron Man (1994)	1994–1997	Iron Man, Fantastic Four, and The Incredible Hulk.
The Man from U.N.C.L.E., Please Don't Eat the Daisies, McHale's Navy, and The Girl from U.N.C.L.E.	The Man from U.N.C.L.E.	1964–1967; 1983	Also Includes The Glass Bottom Boat and Return of the Man from U.N.C.L.E.
I Love Lucy and Other Series	I Love Lucy	1951– 1971; 1986–1994	I Love Lucy, The Danny Thomas Show, The Bill Dana Show, The Lucy-Desi Comedy Hour, The Andy Griffith Show, Gomer Pyle, U.S.M.C., Mayberry R.F.D., The Joey Bishop Show, The Dick Van Dyke Show, The New Andy Griffith Show, It's Garry Shandling's Show, and Herman's Head. Also includes I Love Lucy: The Movie.
Father Knows Best and Other Series	Father Knows Best	1954–1999	Charlie's Angels (1976 TV series), Vegas, The Love Boat and revival Love Boat: The Next Wave, Fantasy Island, Leave It to Beaver and sequel The New Leave It to Beaver, Father Knows Best, Martin, and The Brady Bunch with reunion films and spin-offs The Brady Bunch Hour, A Very Brady Christmas, and The Bradys.
Knight Rider Universe	Knight Rider (1982)	1982–2009	Knight Rider (1982 TV series), Code of Vengeance, Team Knight Rider, Knight Rider 2000, Knight Rider 2010, Knight Rider (2008 TV series), and the 2008 film, Knight Rider.
Happy Days and Other Series	Happy Days	1974–1984	Happy Days, Laverne & Shirley, Blansky's Beauties, Mork & Mindy, Out of the Blue, Joanie Loves Chachi, and The Fonz and the Happy Days Gang.
The Good Wife, The Good Fight and Elsbeth	The Good Wife	2008–present	
Zeke and Luther and Other Series	Zeke and Luther	2009–2020	Zeke and Luther, Peter Punk, Kickin' It, Pair of Kings, Violetta, Cuando toca la campana, O11CE, Soy Luna, Juacas, and Bia.
Newhart and Other Series	Newhart	1982–2004	Newhart, George and Leo, The Drew Carey Show, Grace Under Fire, Coach, Ellen, Two Guys and a Girl, The Hughleys, The Norm Show, and The Geena Davis Show.
Hot in Cleveland, The Soul Man, and Kirstie	Hot in Cleveland	2010–2016	
Murdoch Mysteries, Republic of Doyle, and Frankie Drake Mysteries	Murdoch Mysteries	2008–present	
Night Court and My Two Dads	Night Court	1984–2025	Also includes Night Court (2023)
The Six Million Dollar Man and The Bionic Woman	The Six Million Dollar Man (1973)	1973–1978; 1987–1994	Also Includes The Return of the Six Million Dollar Man and the Bionic Woman, Bionic Showdown: The Six Million Dollar Man and the Bionic Woman, and Bionic Ever After?
Alice, The Dukes of Hazzard, and Enos	Alice	1976–1985; 1997; 2000	Also includes The Dukes of Hazzard: Reunion! and The Dukes of Hazzard: Hazzard in Hollywood.
Passions, Bewitched, and Nanny and the Professor	Bewitched	1964–1972; 1999–2008	
24 franchise, Tyrant, and Homeland	24	2001–2020	
Roseanne, The Jackie Thomas Show, and The Conners	Roseanne	1988–1997; 2018–present	
Cougar Town and Scrubs	Scrubs	2001–2015	
Fawlty Towers, Only Fools and Horses, The Green Green Grass, and Rock & Chips	Fawlty Towers	1975–2011	
About a Boy and Parenthood	Parenthood	2010–2015	
21 Jump Street and Booker	21 Jump Street	1987–1991	
Home Improvement Thunder Alley, Buddies, Soul Man, Cristela, and Last Man Standing	Home Improvement	1991–1999; 2011–2021	
Battlestar Galactica and Caprica	Battlestar Galactica (2004)	2004–2012	Also includes the films Battlestar Galactica: Razor and Battlestar Galactica: The Plan and the web series' Battlestar Galactica: The Resistance, Battlestar Galactica: Razor Flashbacks, Battlestar Galactica: The Face of the Enemy, and Battlestar Galactica: Blood & Chrome.
B. J. and the Bear, The Misadventures of Sheriff Lobo, and Quincy, M.E.	B. J. and the Bear	1976–1983	
Supernatural and The Winchesters	Supernatural	2005–2023	Also includes the web series/spin-off, Ghostfacers.
The Bob Newhart Show, Murphy Brown, The Famous Teddy Z, Ink, and Bob	The Bob Newhart Show	1972–1998	Elliot Carlin from The Bob Newhart Show appeared in St. Elsewhere, tying universes together, and the Tommy Westphall Universe.
Family Ties, Day by Day, and Parker Lewis Can't Lose	Family Ties	1982–1993	
Smart Guy and Sister, Sister	Sister, Sister	1994–1999	
Charmed (1998 TV series) and Charmed (2018 TV series)	Charmed (1998)	1998–2006; 2018–2022	
M*A*S*H and Other Series	M*A*S*H	1972–2004	M*A*S*H and spin-offs Trapper John, M.D., AfterMASH, and W*A*L*T*E*R, The White Shadow, St. Elsewhere, Tattingers, Method & Red, and Providence. Dr. Roxanne Turner from St. Elsewhere appeared in Homicide: Life on the Street, tying it to the Law and Order Universe and the Tommy Westphall Universe.
Life on Mars and Ashes to Ashes	Life on Mars	2006–2010	
The Family Man and Farzi	The Family Man	2019–present	Characters from The Family Man- Shinde, Ajit, Punit and Srikant Tiwari appear in cameos in Farzi.
Blue Bloods and The Mosquito Coast	Blue Bloods	2010–present	
Anne Rice's Immortal Universe	Interview with the Vampire	2022–present	The fictional Talamasca organization as well as physical settings in New Orleans and magic mechanics connect Interview with the Vampire and Mayfair Witches in an explicitly shared universe
The World Between Us series, Eye of the Storm and Wave Makers	The World Between Us	2019–2025	These medias have the same TV station called "Sense Broadcasting Co."
Shaaticup and Sinpaat	Shaaticup	2022–present	Characters appearing in both shows include Fazu and Babu.
Save Me universe	Save Me	2017–2021	Save Me, Save Me 2, Strangers from Hell, Dark Hole
Street Sharks and Extreme Dinosaurs	Street Sharks	1994–1997	
Fernwood Universe	Mary Hartman, Mary Hartman	1976–1978	Mary Hartman, Mary Hartman, Forever Fernwood, Fernwood 2 Night, America 2-Night
Yes, Sir, Rookies' Diary series, My Teacher is Xiaohe, Girl's Power series, Youngsters On Fire and Go Fighting	Yes, Sir	1990–2023	These TV series are produced by Hao Hsiao-tzu except for Yes, Sir.
Paraverse	Death in Paradise	2013–present	Death in Paradise, Beyond Paradise, and Return to Paradise.

== Shared media ==
This is a partial list of fictional universes created for both television and cinema.

Universe	Origin film or series	Start date	End date	Connecting characters
Star Wars Universe	Star Wars & The Mandalorian	1977/2019	Present	Numerous
Star Trek Universe	Star Trek: the Original Series & Star Trek: The Motion Picture	1966/1979	Present	Numerous
Bourne	The Bourne Identity/Treadstone	2002/2019	2016/2019	
Toei Tokusatsu Universe	Kamen Rider (1971) & Go Go Kamen Rider	1971	Present	
DC Animated Universe	Batman: The Animated Series & Batman: Mask of the Phantasm	1992/1993	2006	
DC Extended Universe	Man of Steel & Peacemaker	2013/2022	2023	Numerous
How to Train Your Dragon	How to train Your Dragon, DreamWorks Dragons	2010/2012	Present	Hiccup, Toothless, Fishlegs Ingerman, Astrid Hofferson, Snotlout Jorgensen, Tuffnut Thorston, Ruffnut Thorston
Marvel Cinematic Universe	Iron Man & Agents of S.H.I.E.L.D.	2008/2013	Present	Numerous
Monsters, Inc. Universe	Monsters, Inc. & Monsters at Work	2001/2021	Present	Mike Wazowski, James P. Sullivan
Pokémon Universe	Pokémon (TV series), Pokémon: The First Movie	1997/1998	Present	Pikachu, Ash Ketchum, Mewtwo, Darkrai
Wallace and Gromit	A Grand Day Out	1989	Present	
World of Twelve	Dofus (MMORPG), Wakfu (TV series), Wakfu (MMORPG), Dofus: The Treasures of Kerubim (TV series) (French Page) & Dofus – Book 1: Julith	2004, 2008, 2012, 2013, & 2016	Present	
Riordanverse	Percy Jackson and the Olympians, The Kane Chronicles, The Trials of Apollo, Magnus Chase and the Gods of Asgard	2005, 2010, 2015, 2016	Present	Percy Jackson, Annabeth Chase, Carter Kane, Sadie Kane, Lester Papadopoulos (A.K.A., Apollo), Magnus Chase
Winx Club Universe	Winx Club	2004	Present	
Stephen King Universe	Carrie	1976	Present	Castle Rock, Shawshank State Prison, Derry, Dick Hallorann, George Bannerman, Alan Pangborn, Carrie White
Walt Disney Studios, Final Fantasy, Kingdom Hearts and The World Ends with You	Cleaning Up!!?	1921, 1987, 2002, 2007	Present	
Proloy Universe	Proloy & Abar Proloy	2011	Present	Binod Behari Dutta, Animesh Dutta
Punorjonmo	Punorjonmo	2021	Present	
DC Universe	Creature Commandos & Superman	2024/2025	Present	
Trendy dramas aired on Sundays produced by Sanlih E-Television	The Prince Who Turns into a Frog	2005	2021	

== See also ==
- List of highest-grossing media franchises
