= Auckland Film Studios =

Film studio in New Zealand

Coordinates: 36.8843165°S 174.630371°E

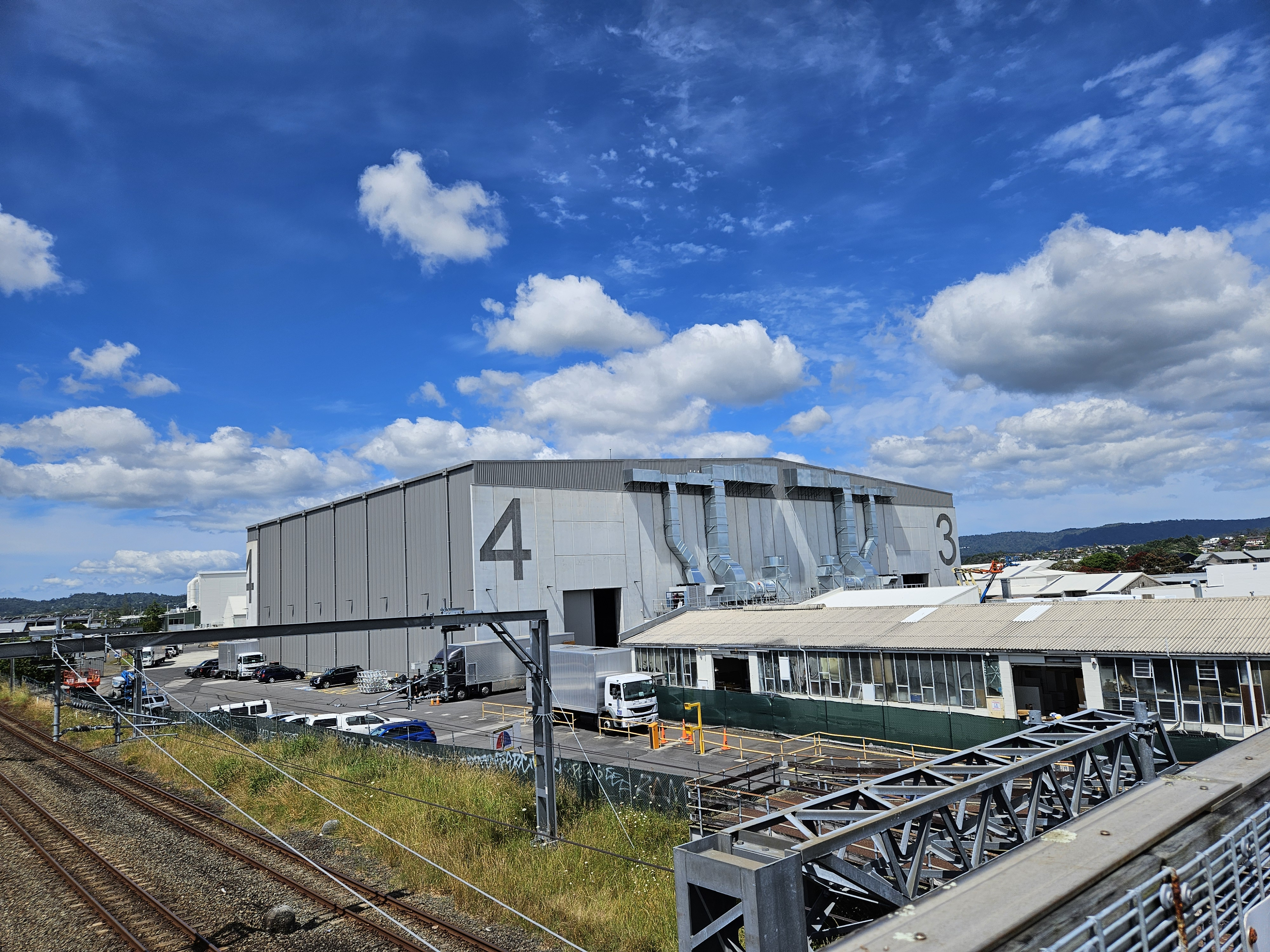
Studios 3 and 4 of Auckland Film Studios

Auckland Film Studios, formerly known as Henderson Valley Studios, is New Zealand's largest film studio complex, located in Henderson, West Auckland. Entrances to the complex are on Hickory Ave, Henderson Valley Road and Rabone Street, Henderson.

The complex was originally built as insulated fruit store houses, hence their nickname, the 'cool stores'. Henderson Valley Studios have been used as film studios since 1994 when they were occupied by the television series Hercules and Xena.

== Filmography ==
=== Films ===
- Hercules and the Amazon Women (1994)
- Hercules and the Lost Kingdom (1994)
- Hercules and the Circle of Fire (1994)
- Hercules in the Underworld (1994)
- Hercules in the Maze of the Minotaur (1994)
- Amazon High (1997)
- Whale Rider (2002)
- Lucy (2003)
- The Last Samurai (2003)
- Deceit (2004)
- Ike: Countdown to D-Day (2004)
- In My Father’s Den (2004)
- Boogeyman (2005)
- The Chronicles of Narnia: The Lion, the Witch and the Wardrobe (2005)
- No. 2 (2006)
- Wendy Wu: Homecoming Warrior (2006)
- Bridge to Terabithia (2007)
- The Tattooist (2007)
- 30 Days of Night (2007)
- The Chronicles of Narnia: Prince Caspian (2008)
- The Warrior's Way (2010)
- Mr. Pip (2012)
- Emperor (2012)
- Crouching Tiger, Hidden Dragon: Sword of Destiny (2016)
- Adrift (2018)
- In Dark Places (2018)
- Mulan (2020)
- Avatar: The Way of Water (2022)
- Choose Love (2023)
- A Minecraft Movie (2025)
- The Wrecking Crew (2026)

=== Television shows ===
- The Tommyknockers (1993)
- Hercules: The Legendary Journeys (1995–99)
- Xena: Warrior Princess (1995–2001)
- Young Hercules (1998–99)
- Cleopatra 2525 (2000–01)
- Jack of All Trades (2000)
- The Chair (2002)
- Power Rangers: Ninja Storm (2003)
- Maddigan's Quest (2006)
- Rude Awakenings (2007)
- Are You Smarter than a 10 Year Old? (2007)
- Legend of the Seeker (2008–10)
- The Shannara Chronicles (2016–17)
- Fresh Eggs (2019)
- The Letter for the King (2020)
- Sweet Tooth (Pilot only)
- The Lord of the Rings: The Rings of Power (Season 1)
- Chief of War (2025)

The studios are also used for countless television commercials.

The studios are laid out over a 4ha site, between Henderson Valley Rd and Railside Ave. Within this site are 4 (soon to be 5) Sound Stages, 2 Production Office spaces, Prop and Costume workshops, as well as various commercial film related operations.

In late 2006, New Zealand's biggest sound stage began construction at Henderson Valley Studios scheduled for completion in mid-2007. This sound stage is purpose built and bigger than that owned by Peter Jackson at his Stone St Studios complex in Wellington.

The studios have been owned by Enterprise Waitakere, the business arm of the Waitakere City Council since 2002. It is because of studios such as Auckland Film Studios, South Pacific Pictures and Studio West, that West Auckland has been dubbed 'Westiewood'.
