= Ben Cooke =

Benjamin Cooke is an English stunt performer and actor.

== Life ==
Cooke started his career in the 1990s as stunt performer. At first, he was acted in numerous television series and movies. For the TV series Hercules: The Legendary Journeys he worked as a stunt performer from 1995 until 1998. In 1999, he was involved for the first time as an actor for an episode in the same series.

In 2001, he first starred in the New Zealand production of Snakeskin. In that same year, he contributed as stunt performer in Peter Jackson's literary adaptation of The Lord of the Rings: The Fellowship of the Ring. He was also seen in the sequel that was released one year later. However, he was not mentioned in the credits for his work in neither of the films.

Cooke contributed as stunt performer and actor in Star Wars: Episode III – Revenge of the Sith. In 2006 he was employed as a stunt double for the main actor Daniel Craig in Casino Royale, where he also undertook a short acting role. In the second James Bond, Quantum of Solace, released in 2008, Cooke again appeared as the stunt double for Craig.

== Filmography ==
Stunt Performer

Year	Title
1992	Marlin Bay
1993	Fearless
1994	Hercules and the Amazon Women
1994	Hercules and the Lost Kingdom
1994	Hercules and the Circle of Fire
1994	Hercules in the Underworld
1994	Hercules in the Maze of the Minotaur
1994	One West Waikiki
1995	Mysterious Island
1995–1998	Hercules: The Legendary Journeys
1996–1998	Xena: Warrior Princess
1998	Young Hercules
1999	Forbidden Island
2000–2001	Jackson's Wharf
2000–2001	Jack of All Trades
2000–2001	Cleopatra 2525
2001	Snakeskin
2001	Being Eve
2001	The Lord of the Rings: The Fellowship of the Ring
2001–2002	Shortland Street
2002	The Four Feathers
2002	Below
2002	The Lord of the Rings: The Two Towers
2003	Power Rangers Ninja Storm
2004	Harry Potter and the Prisoner of Azkaban
2004	Power Rangers Dino Thunder
2004	Thunderbirds
2004	Alexander
2005	Star Wars: Episode III – Revenge of the Sith
2005	Batman Begins
2005	The Legend of Zorro
2006	Power Rangers Mystic Force
2006	Casino Royale
2007	The Last Legion
2007	Boy A
2007	Virgin Territory
2007	Harry Potter and the Order of the Phoenix
2007	The Bourne Ultimatum
2008	The Club
2008	Indiana Jones and the Kingdom of the Crystal Skull
2008	Quantum of Solace
2008	Inkheart
2009	Sherlock Holmes
2010	Green Zone
2010	Prince of Persia: The Sands of Time
2010	Robin Hood
2011	The Last Airbender
2011	The Mechanic
2011	Blitz
2011	Cowboys and Aliens
2011	Killer Elite
2011	The Girl with the Dragon Tattoo
2012	Skyfall
2013	Hansel & Gretel: Witch Hunters
2013	Thor: The Dark World
2014	Fury
2015	Jupiter Ascending
2016	Grimsby
2016	The Huntsman: Winter's War
2016	Alice Through the Looking Glass
2016	Assassin's Creed
2017	Thor: Ragnarok

Actor

Year	Title
1999	Hercules: The Legendary Journeys
2000	Cleopatra 2525
2005	Star Wars: Episode III – Revenge of the Sith
2006	Casino Royale
2007	Doomed

== Awards ==
Screen Actors Guild Award

Year	Category	Work	Result
2008	Best Stunt Ensemble	The Bourne Ultimatum	Won
2009	Best Stunt Ensemble	Indiana Jones and the Kingdom of the Crystal Skull	Nominated
2012	Best Stunt Ensemble	Cowboys and Aliens	Nominated
2013	Best Stunt Ensemble	Skyfall	Won
2015	Best Stunt Ensemble	Fury	Nominated
2021	Best Stunt Ensemble	Mulan	Nominated
2024	Best Stunt Ensemble	Indiana Jones and the Dial of Destiny	Nominated

Taurus World Stunt Awards

Year	Category	Work	Result
2007	Best Fight	Casino Royale	Nominated
2007	Best High Work	Casino Royale	Won
2009	Best High Work	Quantum of Solace	Nominated
2011	Best Speciality Stunt	Prince of Persia: The Sands of Time	Nominated
2012	Best High Work	The Mechanic	Nominated
2024	Best Stunt Coordinator and/or 2nd Unit Director	Indiana Jones and the Dial of Destiny	Nominated
