= List of Hercules: The Legendary Journeys episodes =

Hercules: The Legendary Journeys is a television series that was filmed in New Zealand and the United States, starring Kevin Sorbo as Hercules. It is very loosely based on the tales of the classical Greek culture hero Heracles. It ran for 111 episodes over six seasons.

It was preceded by several TV movies with the same major characters in 1994 as part of Universal Media Studios's Action Pack: in order, Hercules and the Amazon Women, Hercules and the Lost Kingdom, Hercules and the Circle of Fire, Hercules in the Underworld, and Hercules in the Maze of the Minotaur, the last of which served mostly as a "clip show" of the previous movies as a lead up to the series.

== Series overview ==
Season	Episodes	Originally released	
Season	Episodes	First released	Last released
TV films	5	April 25, 1994	November 14, 1994
1	13	January 16, 1995	May 8, 1995
2	24	September 4, 1995	June 24, 1996
3	22	September 30, 1996	May 12, 1997
4	22	September 29, 1997	May 11, 1998
5	22	September 28, 1998	May 17, 1999
6	8	September 27, 1999	November 22, 1999

== Episodes ==
=== Television films (1994) ===
Title	Directed by	Written by	Original release date
Hercules and the Amazon Women	Bill L. Norton	Andrew Dettmann, Jule Selbo & Daniel Truly	April 25, 1994
On the even of Iolaus's marriage, a village of men seeks Hercules's aid to defeat a band of mysterious creatures. Hercules discovers that these "creatures" are the women of the village, who have left their chauvinistic men and aligned themselves with Hera.
Hercules and the Lost Kingdom	Harley Cokeliss	Christian Williams	May 2, 1994
Hercules comes to the aid of a young woman who is seeking the lost city of Troy. Eventually, he leads her to a camp of refugees from a city taken over by Hera's Blue Priests. Hercules helps the refugees take back the city.
Hercules and the Circle of Fire	Doug Lefler	Andrew Dettmann, Barry Pullman & Daniel Truly	October 31, 1994
When all the Earth's fire begins to go out, Hercules and Deianeira seek to stop the world from freezing.
Hercules in the Underworld	Bill L. Norton	Andrew Dettmann & Daniel Truly	November 7, 1994
As villagers begin disappearing, it is discovered that they had fallen through a crack in the Earth and plunged straight into Hades. Coming to the rescue, Hercules faces one of his most difficult challenges and must prove himself as a man as well as a god.
Hercules in the Maze of the Minotaur	Josh Becker	Andrew Dettmann & Daniel Truly	November 14, 1994
Hercules has settled down to spend time with his family, but, when a distant village is threatened by an unseen monster, he is called upon to help save the village.

=== Season 1 (1995) ===
No. overall	No. in season	Title	Directed by	Written by	Original release date	Prod. code
1	1	"The Wrong Path"	Doug Lefler	John Schulian	January 16, 1995	76601
Hercules returns home just in time to see Deianira and his children murdered by Hera. Vowing vengeance, he sets out to destroy the goddess, but a young girl helps to soothe his soul and turn him from the dark path he has chosen.
2	2	"Eye of the Beholder"	John T. Kretchmer	John Schulian	January 23, 1995	76605
Hercules runs from the 50 daughters of Thespius. Hercules agrees to aid the town of Trachis terrorized by a Cyclops, but soon learns that the creature's actions may not be entirely unjustified.
3	3	"The Road to Calydon"	Doug Lefler	Andrew Dettmann & Daniel Truly	January 30, 1995	76602
A group of refugees fleeing Parthus, a city destroyed by Hera, seek Hercules' help in staving off the attacks of the goddess and her followers. Hercules learns along the way that Broteas, the leader of the refugees, had stolen a cup from Hera, prompting her wrath on the city and continued pursuance of the group.
4	4	"The Festival of Dionysus"	Peter Ellis	Andrew Dettmann & Daniel Truly	February 6, 1995	76609
Hercules is invited to the Festival of Dionysus in Meliad because of an ill omen. Nothing seems to be out of place as the festival begins, but the presence of Tiresias cues Hercules that something foul is afoot and he tries to get to the bottom of it.
5	5	"Ares"	Harley Cokeliss	Steve Roberts	February 13, 1995	76603
Ares plans to form an army of children, part of his bid to cover the world in war without end. Naturally it falls to Hercules to stop his evil half-brother. Thankfully, he has the aid of the warrior blacksmith Atalanta.
6	6	"As Darkness Falls"	George Mendeluk	Robert Bielak	February 20, 1995	76607
A woman named Penelope is set to marry a man named Marcus, but the centaur Nemis wishes her for himself and makes a deal with Hera to make her his, but first he has to kill the eternal thorn in Hera's side, Hercules.
7	7	"Pride Comes Before a Brawl"	Peter Ellis	Steve Roberts	February 27, 1995	76604
Iolaus becomes prideful after some initial successes and arrogantly decides to race Hercules to the city of Thrace. The two separate, but then Hercules finds he has to contend with his old flame Nemesis, sent by Hera to kill Iolaus for his behavior.: Eric Gruendemann, one of the show's producers, makes a cameo appearance as a fisherman.
8	8	"The March to Freedom"	Harley Cokeliss	Adam Armus & Kay Foster	March 6, 1995	76606
After purchasing an Asian slave to free her, Hercules gets more than he bargained for when she asks for his help in freeing her fiancé, who incidentally is set to be fed to the lions in a large public spectacle.
9	9	"The Warrior Princess"	Bruce Seth Green	John Schulian	March 13, 1995	76608
Iolaus is seduced by the cunning and cruel Xena, Warrior Princess, who aims to use him to destroy Hercules, leaving her free to take over the world.
10	10	"Gladiator"	Garth Maxwell	Robert Bielak	March 20, 1995	76611
Trying to reunite a woman and her young baby with her prisoner husband, Hercules and Iolaus enter a slave prison where the inmates are forced to fight in to-death gladiatorial tournaments.
11	11	"The Vanishing Dead"	Bruce Campbell	Andrew Dettmann & Daniel Truly	April 24, 1995	76610
Hercules, with Iolaus, are asked to investigate the ghost of a deceased soldier, and wind ups finding himself battling Graegus, Ares' dog of war.
12	12	"The Gauntlet"	Jack Perez	Peter Bielak	May 1, 1995	76612
Xena is betrayed by her lieutenant, Darphus, and forced to walk "the gauntlet". Determined to get her revenge, she forms an alliance with Hercules, who tries to make her see that there is more to life than vengeance and evil.
13	13	"Unchained Heart"	Bruce Seth Green	John Schulian	May 8, 1995	76613
It's the end of the season and Hercules, Salmoneus, Xena and Iolaus team up to fight Darphus, who has risen from the grave and plans to feed Hercules to Ares' dog of war Graegus. In the end, Ares loses his most valuable pawn as Xena turns her back on evil once and for all.

=== Season 2 (1995-1996) ===
No. overall	No. in season	Title	Directed by	Written by	Original release date	Prod. code
14	1	"The King of Thieves"	Doug Lefler	Doug Lefler	September 4, 1995	876807
Autolycus commits robbery but Iolaus is sentenced to death for the act so Hercules must find the real culprit to save the life of Iolaus.
15	2	"All That Glitters"	Garth Maxwell	Craig Volk	September 11, 1995	876805
Hercules and Salmoneus visit King Midas' gambling palace, only to find that it has got out of control with sadistic entertainment after it was taken over by a villainess and her henchman.
16	3	"What's in a Name?"	Bruce Campbell	Michael Marks	September 18, 1995	876803
Hercules learns that his half-brother Iphicles in Phlegra is claiming to be him, and is planning to wed the stepdaughter of evil warlord Gorgus.
17	4	"Siege at Naxos"	Stephen L. Posey	Darrell Fetty	September 25, 1995	876810
Hercules and Iolaus capture Goth, the leader of a band of barbarians. They plan to take him to Athens, where he will stand trial. Goth's men follow Hercules and Iolaus to free their leader.
18	5	"Outcast"	Bruce Seth Green	Robert Bielak	October 2, 1995	876801
Deric, a centaur, and his human wife, Lyla and their son, Kefor are being persecuted because she married a centaur. When Lyla is killed, Deric takes revenge on the people and kills two men in self defense. Hercules fights alongside Deric against the prejudice of the local people.
19	6	"Under the Broken Sky"	James A. Contner	John Schulian	October 9, 1995	876811
When Hercules finds Salmoneus working in a pleasure palace, he meets a woman named Lucina. Hercules helps to get her away from the life she has been living and reunites her with her estranged husband.
20	7	"The Mother of All Monsters"	Bruce Seth Green	John Schulian	October 16, 1995	876806
Echidna, the self-proclaimed "Mother of All Monsters", is out to get revenge on Hercules for killing all of her children.
21	8	"The Other Side"	George Mendeluk	Robert Bielak	October 30, 1995	876802
When Persephone, the daughter of Demeter is abducted by Hades, Hercules travels to the Underworld to rescue her. While there, he briefly reunites with his family.
22	9	"The Fire Down Below"	Timothy Bond	Story by : John Schulian; Teleplay by : Scott Smith Miller	November 6, 1995	876804
Salmoneus incurs Hera's wrath when he takes a stash of her treasure and sells it. With Nemesis sent to dispatch divine retribution, Hercules finds himself in the hot of things – literally.
23	10	"Cast a Giant Shadow"	John T. Kretchmer	John Schulian	November 13, 1995	876814
While Hercules befriends Typhon, a bumbling but kind hearted giant (along with the husband of Echinda), Iolaus is captured by Maceus, brother of Demetrius (from 'The Mother of All Monsters'), vowing revenge on Hercules.
24	11	"Highway to Hades"	T.J. Scott	Robert Bielak	November 20, 1995	876813
Sisyphus escapes from the Underworld and tricks Timeron into taking his place. It is up to Hercules to restore justice by capturing Sisyphus and freeing Timeron.
25	12	"The Sword of Veracity"	Steven Baum	Garth Maxwell	January 8, 1996	876817
When their friend, Amphion is framed for murder, Hercules and Iolaus set off to find the Sword of Veracity, which will make the real culprit admit the truth and set Amphion free.
26	13	"The Enforcer"	T.J. Scott	Nelson Costello	January 15, 1996	876815
Nemesis is made mortal and Hera sends her Enforcer to kill Hercules.
27	14	"Once a Hero"	Rob Tapert	Story by : Rob Tapert and Robert Bielak & John Schulian; Teleplay by : John Schulian & Robert Bielak	January 29, 1996	876818
When the Golden Fleece is stolen, Hercules and Iolaus team up with Jason to retrieve it.
28	15	"Heedless Hearts"	Peter Ellis	Robert Bielak	February 5, 1996	876819
Iolaus is struck by lightning, which gives him the power of foresight. When he and Hercules help out Rheanna in her fight against a tyrannical ruler, Melkos, Hercules begins falling for her.
29	16	"Let the Games Begin"	Gus Trikonis	John Schulian	February 12, 1996	876808
To try and stop the Spartans and the Eleans fighting, Hercules devises the first ever Olympic Games.
30	17	"The Apple"	Kevin Sorbo	Steven Baum	February 19, 1996	876824
Aphrodite gives Iolaus a magical golden apple that makes anyone who touches it fall in love with him, but it serves to jeopardise a wedding that will bring together two feuding kingdoms.
31	18	"Promises"	Stewart Main	Michael Marks	March 4, 1996	876809
When Ramina, the fiancée of King Beraeus is kidnapped, it is up to Hercules and Iolaus to rescue her. Although it appears she may not want to be rescued after all.
32	19	"King for a Day"	Anson Williams	Patricia Manney	March 18, 1996	876816
When Prince Orestes is drugged so he cannot attend his coronation, Iolaus stands in his stead so that Orestes' brother, Minos will not become king.
33	20	"Protean Challenge"	Oley Sassone	Brian Herskowitz	April 22, 1996	876825
Thanis, a friend of Hercules and Iolaus, is framed for a crime he did not commit. Hercules and Iolaus help out to prove his innocence.
34	21	"The Wedding of Alcmene"	Timothy Bond	John Schulian	April 29, 1996	876822
Alcmene tells Hercules and Iolaus that she is to marry Jason. Hera resurrects the Blue Priest who plans to kill Hercules at the wedding. Meanwhile, as Jason must give up his crown as Alcmene is not of royal descent, Hercules sends Iolaus to seek out his half-brother Iphicles, hoping Iphicles can become the new king of Corinth.
35	22	"The Power"	Charlie Haskell	Nelson Costello	May 6, 1996	876823
Deon discovers he has the godly power to order people to do his bidding. Hercules helps him to use his gift wisely.
36	23	"Centaur Mentor Journey"	Stephen L. Posey	Robert Bielak	May 13, 1996	876821
Hercules' dying mentor, the centaur Ceridian, asks him to stop another of his protégés, fellow centaur Cassius, from going to war with humans over a struggle for equal rights.
37	24	"The Cave of Echoes"	Gus Trikonis	John Schulian & Robert Bielak	June 24, 1996	876820
Hercules and Iolaus, accompanied by a timid young writer, head into the perilous Cave of Echoes to rescue a man's daughter, whilst they recall some of their past adventures.

=== Season 3 (1996-1997) ===
No. overall	No. in season	Title	Directed by	Written by	Original release date	Prod. code
38	1	"Mercenary"	Michael Hurst	Robert Bielak	September 30, 1996	76827
Hercules is shipwrecked on a deserted island and must fight a mercenary, a band of pirates and battle giant sand monsters.
39	2	"Doomsday"	Michael Lange	Brian Herskowitz	October 7, 1996	76830
When Daedalus falls under the evil influence of King Nikolos, Hercules must step in to help his friend regain the right path.
40	3	"Love Takes a Holiday"	Charlie Haskell	Noreen Tobin & Gene F. O'Neill	October 14, 1996	V0113
Aphrodite quits as the Goddess of Love and tries out a new career, meanwhile there is a plot to kidnap Iolaus' grandmother, Leandra.
41	4	"Mummy Dearest"	Anson Williams	Melissa Rosenberg	October 21, 1996	76833
Hercules must retrieve a lost mummy before it can consume human life force and become an evil monster.
42	5	"Not Fade Away"	T.J. Scott	John Schulian	October 28, 1996	76831
Hera unleashes the Enforcer mk. II, made of fire. When this fiery foe kills Iolaus, Hercules strikes a deal with Hades – until sunset to defeat the new Enforcer in exchange for Iolaus' life, and has an unlikely companion – the original Enforcer.
43	6	"Monster Child in the Promised Land"	John T. Kretchmer	John Schulian	November 4, 1996	76826
Hercules and Iolaus hear that Echidna and Typhon have had another baby monster, but their help is soon needed when the baby is kidnapped by a small-time thief.
44	7	"The Green-Eyed Monster"	Chuck Braverman	Steven Baum	November 11, 1996	76828
Aphrodite's son Cupid is in love with Psyche, a mortal. But Aphrodite is jealous of Psyche's beauty. Hercules is accidentally shot by one of Cupid's arrows, making him too fall in love with Psyche.
45	8	"Prince Hercules"	Charles Siebert	Story by : Brad Carpenter; Teleplay by : Robert Bielak	November 18, 1996	76834
Hercules and Iolaus are traveling to a festival when they save some travelers from a group of bandits. Hercules decides to travel with them so they will not be attacked again. Hercules is knocked unconscious and stricken with amnesia when he wakes up. Queen Parnassa convinces him that he is her son so he will lead her army in Hera's name.
46	9	"A Star to Guide Them"	Michael Levine	Story by : John Schulian; Teleplay by : Brian Herskowitz and John Schulian	December 9, 1996	76835
Iolaus has a strange dream, which leaves him with a yearning to travel north. Meanwhile, King Polonius and Queen Maliphone round up all the boys under one year old, because the Oracle has said that the next king will not be their heir.
47	10	"The Lady and the Dragon"	Oley Sassone	Michael Berlin & Eric Estrin	January 13, 1997	76832
Hercules must fight a dragon, when he hears news of it terrorizing several villages in Laurentia and killing some of his old friends.
48	11	"Long Live the King"	Timothy Bond	Story by : Patricia Manney; Teleplay by : Sonny Gordon	January 20, 1997	V0114
Iolaus' help is once again needed by his look-alike cousin, King Orestes. But when Orestes is murdered, Iolaus must once more take his place to try and secure a peace treaty.
49	12	"Surprise"	Oley Sassone	Alex Kurtzman	January 27, 1997	V0117
Hercules has a nasty surprise for his birthday when Xena's mortal foe Callisto makes a deal with Hera to escape the afterlife and drug Herc's family, in a plot to kill the half-god in return for her freedom.
50	13	"Encounter"	Charlie Haskell	Jerry Patrick Brown	February 3, 1997	V0119
Hercules tries to save the Golden Hind, a part-woman, part-deer, from hunters. But the Hind is being used in a plot by Ares, in a scheme to kill Herc. Meanwhile, Hercules starts to fall in love with the Hind in human form.
51	14	"When a Man Loves a Woman"	Charlie Haskell	Noreen Tobin & Gene F. O'Neill	February 10, 1997	V0116
Hercules asks Serena to marry him. But Ares is still manipulating the situation and, determined to destroy the pair's relationship, makes Hercules a deal – Serena's hand in return for Hercules giving up his godly powers.
52	15	"Judgment Day"	Gus Trikonis	Robert Bielak	February 17, 1997	V0120
Hercules is now without his powers and married to Serena, but Strife frames him for killing his new bride, leaving the townspeople ready to lynch him. Xena and Gabrielle must help to rectify the situation.
53	16	"The Lost City"	Charlie Haskell	Story by : Robert Bielak and Liz Friedman; Teleplay by : Robert Bielak	February 24, 1997	V0109
Iolaus and his companion Moria discover an underground cult that has brainwashed Salmoneus and Iolaus' missing cousin Regina, part of a group duped into mining for gold for crooked cult leader Kamaros.
54	17	"Les Contemptibles"	Charlie Haskell	Brian Herskowitz	April 7, 1997	V0123
Troyes, France: 1789 – Marie de Valle makes a deal with a man claiming to be the infamous Revolutionary Chartreuse Fox to try a turn two highwaymen into fellow Revolutionary fighters. But no-one is as they seem. (clip show)
55	18	"Reign of Terror"	Rodney Charters	John Kirk	April 14, 1997	V0112
King Augeus has gone mad and believes himself to be Zeus. Naturally, Hera uses the situation to her own means – he can have real godly powers if he can kill Hercules.
56	19	"The End of the Beginning"	James Whitmore, Jr.	Paul Robert Coyle	April 21, 1997	V0124
Autolycus steals the Cronus stone, which whisks himself and Hercules five years into the past. While Autolycus and his past self plan to steal the stone over again, Hercules is reunited with Serena, still alive in this time-line.
57	20	"War Bride"	Kevin Sorbo	Adam Armus & Kay Foster	April 28, 1997	V0126
Hercules and Iolaus rescue a spoilt princess from kidnappers, and as they try to return her home, it emerges that her own sister is behind the kidnapping as she plots to become Queen herself.
58	21	"A Rock and a Hard Place"	Robert Trebor	Alex Kurtzman & Roberto Orci	May 5, 1997	V0128
A suspected murderer is trapped under a rock fall in a mine. Hercules must convince the man to confess before he dies.
59	22	"Atlantis"	Gus Trikonis	Roberto Orci & Alex Kurtzman	May 12, 1997	V0121
Hercules is washed up on the strange island of Atlantis, a technologically advanced place where an outcast psychic is predicting the island's impending doom, but no-one will listen to her.

=== Season 4 (1997-1998) ===
No. overall	No. in season	Title	Directed by	Written by	Original release date	Prod. code
60	1	"Beanstalks and Bad Eggs"	John T. Kretchmer	Melissa Rosenberg	September 29, 1997	V0129
Hercules and Autolycus climb a beanstalk to rescue a maiden from a giant who lives in the clouds. The three golden eggs that the girl is caring for spell even more trouble for the duo.
61	2	"Hero's Heart"	Philip Sgriccia	Jerry Patrick Brown	October 6, 1997	V0313
The goddess Fortune wipes Iolaus' memory after a woman he is trying to save falls to her death. Iolaus becomes a thief and begins working for the local gang.
62	3	"Regrets... I've Had a Few"	Gus Trikonis	Paul Robert Coyle	October 13, 1997	V0309
Celesta, the goddess of death, comes for Jaris, an old childhood friend of Hercules. Hercules remembers the first time he met Celesta, and attempts to stop her from taking Jaris to the Elysian Fields.
63	4	"Web of Desire"	Michael Lange	Roberto Orci & Alex Kurtzman	October 20, 1997	V0133
After the pirate Nebula is attacked by Arachne the spider woman, Hercules and Iolaus decide to help her out.
64	5	"Stranger in a Strange World"	Michael Levine	Paul Robert Coyle	October 27, 1997	V0130
When Iolaus is kidnapped into a parallel universe, Hercules must save him from the wrath of the Sovereign.
65	6	"Two Men and a Baby"	Christopher Graves	Story by : Kevin Sorbo; Teleplay by : John Hudock	November 3, 1997	V0122
Nemesis comes to Hercules and Iolaus' camp with her young infant and tells Hercules that he is the father. She leaves the baby with the two men and vanishes. Ares and Hercules must then battle it out over the baby.
66	7	"Prodigal Sister"	Gary Jones	Robert Blielak	November 10, 1997	V0125
Hercules help reunite a blind teenager with his long-lost sister, who was kidnapped years ago by a group of renegade Amazons.
67	8	"...And Fancy Free"	Michael Hurst	Alex Kurtzman & Roberto Orci	November 17, 1997	V0132
Hercules must help a young girl's dream come true by becoming her dance partner to help her win the competition. Problem is Hercules cannot dance. Enter Widow Twanky, to teach Hercules some moves.
68	9	"If I Had a Hammer"	Steve Polivka	Paul Robert Coyle	January 12, 1998	V0127
The lonely blacksmith, Atalanta, forges a lifelike statue of Hercules out of scrap metal. Hephaestus brings the statue to life, but the new "Hercules" is childlike and nothing like the original. Discord encourages "Hercules" to commit murder, framing the real Hercules for the crime. Hercules and his double fight it out and "Hercules" helps saves Atalanta's life.
69	10	"Hercules on Trial"	John Laing	Robert Bielak	January 19, 1998	V0134
When a man impersonating Hercules is killed doing a good deed, Hercules is put on trial for encouraging ordinary people to risk their lives to help others in need.
70	11	"Medea Culpa"	Charles Siebert	Story by : Robert Bielak; Teleplay by : Robert Bielak and Alex Kurtzman & Roberto Orci	January 26, 1998	V0315
While on a fishing trip, Hercules, Iolaus and Jason reminisce about the time when they met Medea and fought the fire-breathing monster, Ghidra.
71	12	"Men in Pink"	Alan J. Levi	Alex Kurtzman & Roberto Orci	February 2, 1998	V0317
Salmoneus and Autolycus are framed for murdering a rich king, and hide out as female dancers in Widow Twanky's all-girl dance troupe.
72	13	"Armageddon Now: Part 1"	Mark Beesley	Paul Robert Coyle	February 9, 1998	V0319
Hope frees Callisto from her prison and sends her back through time to prevent Hercules from being born. Iolaus convinces Ares to send him back to stop her.
73	14	"Armageddon Now: Part 2"	Mark Beesley	Story by : Paul Robert Coyle; Teleplay by : Gene F. O'Neill & Noreen V. Tobin	February 16, 1998	V0320
With Hercules and the Sovereign trapped in a limbo world, Iolaus must navigate a deadly alternate timeline where Xena rules the known world. This episode continues directly on from the events of the Xena episode "Maternal Instincts." and the Hercules episode, "Stranger in a Strange World."
74	15	"Yes, Virginia, There Is a Hercules"	Christopher Graves	Alex Kurtzman & Roberto Orci	February 23, 1998	V0318
In this clip show, an earthquake in modern-day Los Angeles causes panic for the writers of Hercules when the series' star, Kevin Sorbo goes missing.
75	16	"Porkules"	Christopher Graves	Alex Kurtzman & Roberto Orci	March 16, 1998	V0322
Discord gets her hands on Artemis' bow and uses it to turn Hercules into a pig. Iolaus and Autolycus race to save the pig Herc from a butcher's chopping block.
76	17	"One Fowl Day"	Michael Hurst	Adam Armus & Kay Foster	March 23, 1998	V0314
Continuing on from the previous episode, Aphrodite turns the pig Katherine into a human, while Ares, angry about their turning Discord into a chicken, exacts his revenge on Iolaus and Autolycus by chaining them together.
77	18	"My Fair Cupcake"	Rick Jacobson	Gene F. O'Neill & Noreen V. Tobin	April 13, 1998	V0324
When Autolycus plans to steal a priceless sapphire, he dupes naïve would-be girlfriend Cupcake into posing as a princess to gain entry, but walks into the middle of a feud between two opposing kingdoms when they unknowingly use one of these kingdoms as their cover. Iolaus, upon learning of this, allows Autolycus to carry out his scheme to help buy time for Hercules who is working on preventing a potential war between the two kingdoms.
78	19	"War Wounds"	John Mahaffie	Paul Robert Coyle	April 20, 1998	V0324
Iolaus and Hercules become involved in a feud between war veterans and Hercules' half-brother, King Iphicles. But they are all in danger when the action moves to a prison surrounded by deadly sand-sharks.
79	20	"Twilight"	Philip Sgriccia	Gene F. O'Neill & Noreen V. Tobin and Alex Kurtzman & Roberto Orci	April 27, 1998	TBA
When Hercules rushes to see his mother Alcmene, whose health is failing fast, they reminisce about how Herc, as a teenager, left with Iolaus and Jason to go to war for the first time.
80	21	"Top God"	Charles Siebert	Story by : Paul Robert Coyle; Teleplay by : Jerry Patrick Brown	May 4, 1998	V0325
With his mother Alcmene dead, Hercules is asked by estranged father Zeus to join him ruling the Gods of Olympus, causing him to recall a teenage brush with Godliness and the brash God Apollo.
81	22	"Reunions"	Charles Siebert	Alex Kurtzman & Roberto Orci and Jerry Patrick Brown	May 11, 1998	V0326
Hercules has agreed to join father Zeus as a God of Olympus, but soon learns that his father had an ulterior motive for inviting him. Meanwhile, Iolaus visits his mother whom he has not seen for many years.

=== Season 5 (1998-1999) ===
No. overall	No. in season	Title	Directed by	Written by	Original release date	Prod. code
82	1	"Faith"	Michael Hurst	Alex Kurtzman & Roberto Orci	September 28, 1998	V0311
Hercules and Iolaus sail to the land of Sumeria with Nebula to help King Gilgamesh, who claims he is under attack by gods. But nothing is as it seems.
83	2	"Descent"	Richard Compton	Lisa Klink	October 5, 1998	V0328
Grieving over the loss of Iolaus, Hercules vows to persuade the Sumerian gods to bring him back from their underworld. Reluctantly accompanied by Nebula, he sets off on his quest, but many things stand in their way.
84	3	"Resurrection"	Philip Sgriccia	Alex Kurtzman & Roberto Orci	October 12, 1998	V0329
Hercules, having lost his confidence as a hero, is washed up on the island of Eire, where Druids claim he is their "Chosen One," brought to them to deal with an evil demigod who is out to destroy them with the help of the horned god Cernunnos.
85	4	"Genies and Grecians and Geeks, Oh My!"	John Cameron	Paul Robert Coyle	October 19, 1998	V0332
Salmoneus and Autolycus wind up in possession of a sultan's lamp and release a genie who grants them three wishes. But they soon learn to be careful what they wish for. Meanwhile, the sultan wants his lamp back.
86	5	"Render Unto Caesar"	John Laing	Gene F. O'Neill & Noreen V. Tobin	October 26, 1998	V0330
Hercules, still in Eire, is teaching Morrigan to face her new role as guardian of Justice, when Caesar prepares to attack the isle. Herc leads the locals and Morrigan in defending the island.
87	6	"Norse by Norsevest"	John Laing	Story by : Paul Robert Coyle; Teleplay by : Gerry Conway	November 2, 1998	V0333
Hercules, having had a vision that he must save a man's life, heads to Norway, where he learns that the man is in fact the Norse God Balder. Soon he becomes entangled in an end-of-the-world prophecy.
88	7	"Somewhere Over the Rainbow Bridge"	Michael Hurst	Gerry Conway	November 9, 1998	V0710
Hercules is forced to join forces with Thor to stop the evil Loki, who is trying to bring about Ragnarok, the end of all things.
89	8	"Darkness Rising"	Chris Long	Lisa Klink	November 16, 1998	V0331
Hercules is enjoying life in Eire, where he is getting close to Morrigan. But visions of Nebula in danger lead him and Morrigan back to Sumeria, where they find Nebula on the brink of insanity after visions of the dead Iolaus.
90	9	"For Those of You Just Joining Us..."	Bruce Campbell	Alex Kurtzman & Roberto Orci	January 4, 1999	V0334
Studio head B.S. Hollingfoffer orders the producers and writers to come up with better stories for the series, so they head off to a corporate retreat camp, but once there, someone keeps trying to kill them. (clip show)
91	10	"Let There Be Light"	Robert Radler	Gene F. O'Neill & Noreen V. Tobin	January 11, 1999	V0713
Hercules, with Morrigan and Nebula, returns to Greece in pursuit of Dahak who, in Iolaus' body, has convinced the locals that he is their savior and that Hercules is out to destroy them. Herc must find a way to separate Dahak from Iolaus.
92	11	"Redemption"	Bruce Campbell	Lisa Klink	January 18, 1999	V0714
Hercules attempts to exorcise Dahak from Iolaus' body and free his friend's soul.
93	12	"Sky High"	John Laing	Paul Robert Coyle	January 25, 1999	V0718
Hercules, with Amazon Ephiny, recruits a rag-tag band, including a murderer, in a mission to use explosive crystals to blow a hole in the side of a volcano and stop lava from destroying a town in its path.
94	13	"Stranger and Stranger"	Bruce Campbell	Story by : Paul Robert Coyle; Teleplay by : Gerry Conway	February 1, 1999	V0716
Hercules travels back to the Alternate Universe, where Iolaus' parallel double joins him in trying to free the gods of Olympus, whom Ares has entrapped.
95	14	"Just Passing Through"	Charles Siebert	Gene F. O'Neill & Noreen V. Tobin	February 8, 1999	V0327
Hercules, missing the original Iolaus, tells Iolaus II of an adventure where he and Iolaus had to retrieve a stolen ruby from Autolycus, who had a curse looming over him until he returned it.
96	15	"Greece Is Burning"	Michael Hurst	Andrew Landis & Julia Swift	February 15, 1999	V0715
Hercules helps Althea achieve her goal of putting on a fashion show and calls upon the aid of the washed-up Widow Twanky.
97	16	"We'll Always Have Cyprus"	Garth Maxwell	Story by : Stephanie C. Meyer; Teleplay by : Alex Kurtzman & Roberto Orci	February 22, 1999	V0721
Morrigan returns and joins Hercules on his mission to save the Oracle of Cyprus from a wronged soul who has returned from the grave to destroy her. As they travel, Hercules learns why Morrigan suddenly left him.
98	17	"The Academy"	Charlie Haskell	Paul Robert Coyle	March 15, 1999	TBA
Hercules and Jason return to their old academy with Iolaus II, where they find the place in chaos as a group of renegade cadets are taking over the running of the school. Meanwhile, Jason finds he has a daughter he never knew existed. The storyline from this episode is based on the series' second spinoff Young Hercules, which also adapts several characters from that series.
99	18	"Love on the Rocks"	Rick Jacobson	Kevin Maynard	April 19, 1999	V0720
With Hercules away on a mission, Iolaus II admits to Aphrodite that he longs to experience love. Meanwhile, Discord turns Nautica (Angela Dotchin) the mermaid into a beautiful woman, and soon Nautica and Iolaus fall in love, unaware that Discord's ulterior motive is that a spell Poseidon placed on Nautica long ago will cause the seas to freeze unless Nautica returns to the ocean.
100	19	"Once Upon a Future King"	Mark Beesley	Gene F. O'Neill & Noreen V. Tobin	April 26, 1999	V0722
In 500 A.D., Merlin sends tyrannical Arthur of Camelot back to Hercules' time for the half-god to set him straight. Younger Merlin leads Herc to Britannia to team up with Morrigan and stop Arthur and his sorceress accomplice.
101	20	"Fade Out"	Charles Siebert	Gerry Conway	May 3, 1999	V0723
A scheme by Ares, Discord and Ares' new lackey Deimos has cursed a whole village into starting to fade out of existence. When Hercules breaks the stone that has caused the curse, he starts to fade away.
102	21	"My Best Girl's Wedding"	Andrew Merrifield	Gerry Conway	May 10, 1999	V0727
Iolaus II is shocked to learn that his beloved Nautica is being forced into marrying a goon. Meanwhile, Hercules runs into his former wife Serena, who does not recognise him from this time-line, and whose husband is lost at sea. With Aphrodite's help, the two learn that the goon had stolen the trident which belongs to Nautica's father Triton and, while she agreed to marry to get it back and to save her father's life, Nautica is unaware that its power was already lost. Hercules must work at getting a new trident made or the seas will die with Triton.
103	22	"Revelations"	Bruce Campbell	Tom O'Neill & George Strayton	May 17, 1999	V0726
Iolaus returns from beyond the grave to warn Hercules that the end of the world is at hand. The Archangel Michael is bringing about the apocalypse by releasing the Four Horsemen onto the land.

=== Season 6 (1999) ===
No. overall	No. in season	Title	Directed by	Written by	Original release date	Prod. code
104	1	"Be Deviled"	Mark Beesley	Paul Robert Coyle	September 27, 1999	V1102
Hercules and Iolaus trail an evil being that takes the appearance of Hercules's beloved Serena in an attempt to lure him into a life of anger and war.
105	2	"Love, Amazon Style"	David Grossman	Adam Armus & Kay Foster	October 4, 1999	V1106
When Aphrodite's love spell on a tribe of Amazons allows Deimos to order them to follow his every order, Hercules reunites with Aphrodite and Hephaestus to break the spell.
106	3	"Rebel with a Cause"	Garth Maxwell	Lisa Klink	October 11, 1999	V1104
Hercules protects Oedipus's his brash daughter, Princess Antigone (Paige Moss), battling the evil King Creon so that Antigone may take her rightful place as Queen of Thebes.
107	4	"Darkness Visible"	Philip Sgriccia	Phyllis Strong	October 18, 1999	V1101
Although Hercules and Iolaus are summoned by their old friend, Oedipus, to help defend his kingdom from the strigoi (vampires) in Dacia, Vlad is actually leading them into a trap.
108	5	"Hercules, Tramps & Thieves"	Charles Siebert	Liz Friedman & Vanessa Place	November 1, 1999	V1105
Hercules is joined by Autolycus as the latter journeys to Greece to protect its First Bank. Autolycus finds his ex-wife (Traci Lords) working as a showgirl nearby and angry at him for letting her take the rap for a robbery years before.
109	6	"City of the Dead"	Chris Long	Tom ONeill & George Strayton	November 8, 1999	V1108
Hercules and Iolaus, visiting Egypt on a diplomatic mission, save Queen Nefertiti, whose life is endangered during a bitter family feud.
110	7	"A Wicked Good Time"	Adam Nimoy	Liz Friedman & Vanessa Place	November 15, 1999	V1107
Two apprentice witches persuade bullied Seska to join them, but they are in cahoots with Discord to frame Hercules as being an evil warlock.
111	8	"Full Circle"	Bruce Campbell	Alex Kurtzman & Roberto Orci	November 22, 1999	V1103
In the series finale, Hercules and Iolaus try to protect Nemesis and Ares' young son Evander, who can make things happen at will. When Zeus convinces the boy to free Hera, two evil Titans are also released.
