= Anthony Quinn filmography =

Filmography of Mexican-American actor

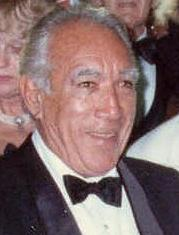
Anthony Quinn at the 40th Primetime Emmy Awards, 1988

Anthony Quinn (April 21, 1915 – June 3, 2001) was a Mexican and American actor. The following is his work's filmography.

Quinn starred in numerous critically acclaimed and commercially successful films, including: Zorba the Greek, Lawrence of Arabia, The Guns of Navarone, The Message, Requiem for a Heavyweight, Guns for San Sebastian, Lion of the Desert and La Strada. He won the Academy Award for Best Supporting Actor twice: for Viva Zapata! in 1952 and Lust for Life in 1956. One film starring Anthony Quinn has been listed on the National Film Registry, for preservation: Lawrence of Arabia.

In addition to theatrical films, Quinn's career also included several appearances on television programs, anthology series, and television films and documentaries. Quinn died of respiratory failure on June 3, 2001, at the age of 86.

Anthony Quinn also made a spoken record, with background accompaniment, The Harold Spina Singers: I Love You and You Love Me (7" Capitol Records CL 15649, UK 1967).

Gotti

== Filmography ==
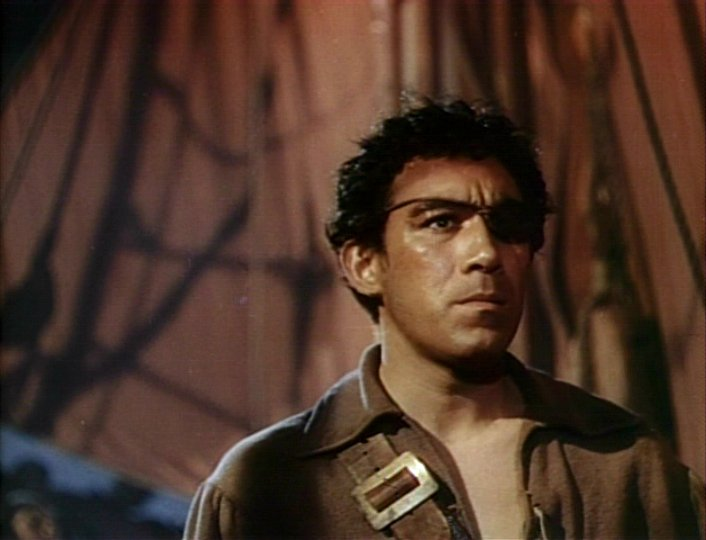
As Wogan in the trailer for The Black Swan (1942 film)

=== Film ===
Year	Title	Role	Notes
1936	The Milky Way	Todd Fight Spectator	Uncredited
1936	Parole!	Zingo Browning	
1936	Sworn Enemy	Gangster	Uncredited
1936	The Plainsman	Cheyenne Indian	
1936	Night Waitress	Gangster	Uncredited
1937	Swing High, Swing Low	The Don	
1937	Waikiki Wedding	Kimo	
1937	Under Strange Flags	Rebel Soldier	Uncredited
1937	The Last Train from Madrid	Capt. Ricardo Álvarez	
1937	Partners in Crime	Nicholas Mazaney	
1937	Daughter of Shanghai	Harry Morgan	
1938	The Buccaneer	Beluche	
1938	Dangerous to Know	Nicholas 'Nicki' Kusnoff	
1938	Tip-Off Girls	Marty	
1938	Hunted Men	Legs	
1938	Bulldog Drummond in Africa	Fordine (henchman)	
1938	King of Alcatraz	Lou Gedney	
1939	King of Chinatown	Mike Gordon	
1939	Union Pacific	Jack Cordray (Campeau henchman)	
1939	Island of Lost Men	Chang Tai	
1939	Television Spy	Forbes	
1940	Emergency Squad	Nick Buller	
1940	Parole Fixer	Francis 'Big Boy' Bradmore	
1940	Road to Singapore	Caesar	
1940	The Ghost Breakers	Ramon Mederos / Francisco Mederos	
1940	City for Conquest	Murray Burns	
1940	Texas Rangers Ride Again	Joe Yuma	
1941	Knockout	Mr. Harry Trego	
1941	Thieves Fall Out	Chic Collins	
1941	Blood and Sand	Manolo de Palma	
1941	Bullets for O'Hara	Tony Van Dyne / Tony Millard	
1941	They Died with Their Boots On	Crazy Horse	
1941	The Perfect Snob	Alexander Moreno	
1942	Larceny, Inc.	Leo Dexter	
1942	Road to Morocco	Mullay Kasim	
1942	The Black Swan	Wogan	
1943	The Ox-Bow Incident	Juan Martinez	
1943	Guadalcanal Diary	Jesus ('Soose') Alvarez	
1944	Buffalo Bill	Chief Yellow Hand	
1944	Ladies of Washington	Michael Romanescue	
1944	Roger Touhy, Gangster	George Carroll	
1944	Irish Eyes Are Smiling	Al Jackson	
1945	China Sky	Chen-Ta	
1945	Where Do We Go from Here?	Chief Badger	
1945	Back to Bataan	Capt. Andrés Bonifácio	
1947	Sinbad the Sailor	Emir Maffi of Daibul	
1947	California	Don Luís Rivera y Hernandez	
1947	The Imperfect Lady	Jose Martinez	
1947	Black Gold	Charley Eagle	
1947	Tycoon	Ricky	
1951	The Brave Bulls	Raul Fuentes	
1951	Mask of the Avenger	Viovanni Larocca	
1952	The Brigand	Prince Ramón	
1952	Viva Zapata!	Eufemio Zapata	Academy Award for Best Supporting Actor
1952	The World in His Arms	Portugee	
1952	Against All Flags	Capt. Roc Brasiliano	
1953	Funniest Show on Earth	Spettatore	
1953	Cavalleria rusticana	Alfio (singing voice by Tito Gobbi)	US title: Fatal Desire
1953	Seminole	Osceola	
1953	City Beneath the Sea	Tony Bartlett	
1953	Ride, Vaquero!	José Constantino Esqueda	
1953	East of Sumatra	Kiang	
1953	Blowing Wild	Ward 'Paco' Conway	
1954	Angels of Darkness	Francesco Caserto	
1954	The Long Wait	Johnny McBride	
1954	La Strada	Zampanò	
1954	Ulysses	Antinoos	
1954	Attila	Attila	
1955	Fatal Desire	Alfio	
1955	The Magnificent Matador	Luís Santos	
1955	The Naked Street	Phil Regal	
1955	Seven Cities of Gold	Capt. Gaspar de Portola	
1956	Lust for Life	Paul Gauguin	Academy Award for Best Supporting Actor; Nominated—Golden Globe Award for Best Supporting Actor – Motion Picture
1956	Man from Del Rio	Dave Robles	
1956	The Hunchback of Notre Dame	Quasimodo	
1956	The Wild Party	Tom Kupfen	
1956	Van Gogh: Darkness Into Light	Himself	Short film Behind-the-scenes documentary on the making of Lust for Life
1957	The River's Edge	Ben Cameron	
1957	The Ride Back	Bob Kallen	
1957	Wild Is the Wind	Gino	Nominated—Academy Award for Best Actor; Nominated—Laurel Award for Top Male Dramatic Performance
1958	Hot Spell	John Henry Duval	
1958	The Buccaneer	N/A	Director
1959	The Black Orchid	Frank Valente	
1959	Warlock	Tom Morgan	
1959	Last Train from Gun Hill	Craig Belden	Nominated—Laurel Award for Top Action Performance
1960	Heller in Pink Tights	Thomas 'Tom' Healy	
1960	The Savage Innocents	Inuk	
1960	Portrait in Black	Dr. David Rivera	
1961	The Guns of Navarone	Col. Andrea Stavrou	
1961	Barabbas	Barabbas	
1962	Requiem for a Heavyweight	Louis 'Mountain' Rivera	
1962	Lawrence of Arabia	Auda Abu Tayi	Nominated—BAFTA Award for Best Foreign Actor; Nominated—Golden Globe Award for Best Actor in a Motion Picture – Drama
1964	The Visit	Serge Miller	Also producer
1964	Behold a Pale Horse	Viñolas	
1964	Zorba the Greek	Alexis Zorba	Also associate producer National Board of Review Award for Best Actor; Nominated—Academy Award for Best Actor; Nominated—BAFTA Award for Best Foreign Actor; Nominated—Golden Globe Award for Best Actor in a Motion Picture – Drama
1965	A High Wind in Jamaica	Chavez	
1965	Marco the Magnificent	Kublai Khan, Mongol emperor of China	
1966	Lost Command	Lt. Col. Pierre Raspeguy	
1967	The 25th Hour	Johann Moritz	
1967	The Happening	Roc Delmonico	
1967	The Rover	Peyrol	
1967	Guns for San Sebastian	Leon Alastray	
1968	The Magus	Maurice Conchis	
1968	The Shoes of the Fisherman	Kiril Lakota	Nominated—Laurel Award for Top Male Dramatic Performance
1968	San Sebastian 1746 in 1968	Himself	Short film Behind-the-scenes documentary on the making of Guns for San Sebastian
1969	The Secret of Santa Vittoria	Italo Bombolini	Nominated—Golden Globe Award for Best Actor in a Motion Picture – Musical or Comedy
1969	A Dream of Kings	Matsoukas	
1970	A Walk in the Spring Rain	Will Cade	
1970	R. P. M.	Prof. F.W.J. 'Paco' Perez	
1970	King: A Filmed Record... Montgomery to Memphis	Himself	Documentary
1970	Flap	Flapping Eagle	
1972	Arruza	Narrator	Voice only, documentary
1972	Across 110th Street	Capt. Mattelli	Also executive producer
1972	The Voice of La Raza	Narrator	Voice only, short film
1972	The Assassination of Julius Caesar	Julius Caesar	Short film
1972	Deaf Smith & Johnny Ears	Erastus 'Deaf' Smith	
1973	The Don Is Dead	Don Angelo	
1974	The Marseille Contract	Steve Ventura	
1976	The Con Artists	Philip Bang	
1976	The Message	Hamza	
1976	The Inheritance	Gregorio Ferramonti	
1976	Target of an Assassin	Ernest Hobday	
1978	The Greek Tycoon	Theo Tomasis	
1978	Caravans	Zulffiqar	
1978	The Children of Sanchez	Jesus Sanchez	
1979	The Passage	The Basque	
1981	Lion of the Desert	Omar Mukhtar	
1981	The Salamander	Bruno Manzini	
1981	High Risk	Mariano	
1982	Valentina	Mosen Joaquín	
1982	Regina Roma	Papa	
1989	Stradivari	Antonio Stradivari	
1989	Man of Passion	Mauricio	
1990	Ghosts Can't Do It	Scott	
1990	Revenge	Tibey	
1990	The Old Man and the Sea	The Old Man	
1991	A Star for Two	Dr. Gabriel Todd	
1991	Jungle Fever	Lou Carbone	
1991	Only the Lonely	Nick Acropolis	
1991	Mobsters	Don Giuseppe 'Joe the Boss' Masseria	
1993	Last Action Hero	Tony Vivaldi	
1994	Somebody to Love	Emillio	
1995	A Walk in the Clouds	Don Pedro Aragon	
1995	Il Mago	Ercole	
1996	Seven Servants	Archie	
1997	The Mayor	Antonio Baracano	
1999	Terra de canons	Sr. de Sicart	
2000	Oriundi	Giuseppe Padovani	Also producer
2002	From Russia to Hollywood: The 100-Year Odyssey of Chekhov and Shdanoff	Himself	Documentary
2002	Avenging Angelo	Angelo Allieghieri	Final film role

=== Television ===
Year	Title	Role	Notes
1947	Pastoral	N/A	Television Film; Director
1949	The Philco-Goodyear Television Playhouse		Episode: '"Pride's Castle"
1951	Pulitzer Prize Playhouse	Babe Callahan	Episode: "Ned Cobb's Daughter"
1951	Somerset Maugham TV Theatre	Matt	Episode: "Partners"
1951	Lights Out		Episode: "The House of Dust"
1951	The Ford Television Theatre		Episode: "Ticket to Oblivion"
1951	Danger		Episode: "Blue"
1951–1955	Schlitz Playhouse	Jason Burrage; Clay Waldon; Pepe	Episode: "Dark Fleece"; Episode: "The Long Trail"; Episode: "Bandit's Hide-Out"
1956	ITV Play of the Week	Troke	Episode: "Rain on the Just"
1963	The Ed Sullivan Show	Poetry Reader	Season 16 Episode 29
1971–1972	The Man and the City	Thomas Jefferson Alcala	15 episodes
1977	Jesus of Nazareth	Caiaphas	Miniseries
1981	Crosscurrent		Television film
1987	Treasure Island in Space	Long John Silver	Miniseries
1988	Onassis: The Richest Man in the World	Socrates Onassis	Television film Nominated—Primetime Emmy Award for Outstanding Supporting Actor in a Miniseries or a Special
1989	The Cosby Show	Mr. Fuentes	Episode: "Surf's Up"
1990	The Old Man and the Sea	Santiago	Television film
1994	This Can't Be Love	Michael Reyman	Television film
1994	Hercules and the Amazon Women	Zeus	Television film
1994	Hercules and the Lost Kingdom	Zeus	Television film
1994	Hercules and the Circle of Fire	Zeus	Television film
1994	Hercules in the Underworld	Zeus	Television film
1994	Hercules in the Maze of the Minotaur	Zeus	Television film
1995	La noche de los castillos	Rey Falop	8 episodes
1996	Gotti	Aniello 'Neil' Dellacroce	Television film Nominated—Golden Globe Award for Best Supporting Actor – Series, Miniseries or Television Film; Nominated—Satellite Award for Best Supporting Actor – Series, Miniseries or Television Film
1999	Cosby	Prof. Christo	Episode: "Lucas Illuminas"
1999	Camino de Santiago	Félix Foulé	Miniseries

== Theatrical performances ==
Date	Title	Role	Notes
December 9–13, 1947	The Gentleman from Athens	Hon. Stephen Socrates Christopher	
June 28, 1948 – May 1949	A Streetcar Named Desire	Stanley Kowalski	Replacement for Marlon Brando
May 23 – June 11, 1950	A Streetcar Named Desire	Stanley Kowalski	
August 21–26, 1950	Borned in Texas	Texas	
October 5, 1960 – March 25, 1961	Becket	Henry II of England	Nominated—Tony Award for Best Actor in a Play
October 25, 1962 – May 18, 1963	Tchin-Tchin	Caesario Grimaldi	
January 5, 1983 – June 30, 1985; December 31, 1985 – August 3, 1986	Zorba	Zorba	
