= Paul McIver =

New Zealand actor, musician (born 1986

- Born: Paul George McIver; 26 March 1986 (age 40); Auckland, New Zealand
- Occupations: Actor, musician
- Years active: 1992–2017
- Spouse: Philippa Moyle (m. 2008)
- Children: 2
- Relatives: Rose McIver (sister)

Paul McIver (born 26 March 1986) is a New Zealand musician and former actor. His first film appearance was in the television series The Ray Bradbury Theater. He has appeared in the Hercules: The Legendary Journeys films and the television show as Hercules' son.

== Biography ==
Paul McIver was born 26 March 1986 in Auckland, New Zealand. He began attending auditions at a young age, and when he was six he landed the role of "Saul Affmann" in an episode of The Ray Bradbury Theater. He is mainly known for playing Hercules' son Aeson in two of the television movies and the series.

McIver took a break from acting for ten years, graduating from Avondale College in 2003, and from the University of Auckland in 2007, with a degree in Music and Film. His father is a photographer and his mother an artist; his sister, Rose McIver, is an actress. He married Philippa Moyle in September 2008, and they have two children.

He played Jesse Collins in three episodes of the New Zealand soap opera Shortland Street, and was part of The Owl and the Pussycat, a classical guitar duo, with Michelle Birch.

== Filmography ==
Film and television roles
Year	Title	Role	Notes
1992	The Ray Bradbury Theater	Saul Affmann	Episode: "The Happiness Machine"
1993	The Adventures of the Black Stallion	Mike	Episode: "Pledging Allegiances"
1993	The Tommyknockers	Davey Brown	TV miniseries
1994	Hercules in the Underworld	Aeson	TV movie
1994	Hercules in the Maze of the Minotaur	Aeson	TV movie
1995	Hercules: The Legendary Journeys	Aeson	Episode: "The Other Side"
1997	Hercules: The Legendary Journeys	Aeson	Episode: "When a Man Loves a Woman"
2008	Shortland Street	Jesse Collins	3 episodes
2012	Switch	Paul	Short film
2013	Hens Night	Groom	Short film

== Theatre ==
Year	Title	Role	Notes
2017	Ghosts	Oswald Alving	Titirangi Theatre
