= Christian William =

Christian William may refer to:

- Christian William Best Basketball Player in the Jersey Shore
- Christian William of Brandenburg (1587–1665), titular Margrave of Brandenburg and Archbishop of Magdeburg
- Christian William I, Prince of Schwarzburg-Sondershausen (1647–1721)

== See also ==
- Christian Williams (born 1943), American journalist
