= Capital News =

Television series

- Series premiere print advertisement
- Genre: Drama
- Created by: David Milch; Christian Williams
- Written by: Nick Harding; David Milch; Gardner Stern; John Tinker; Christian Williams
- Directed by: Andrew Gottlieb; Mark Tinker
- Starring: Lloyd Bridges; Helen Slater; Christian Clemenson; William Russ; Mark Blum; Michael Woods; Daniel Roebuck; Jenny Wright
- Composers: Jan Hammer; J.A.C. Redford
- Country of origin: United States
- Original language: English
- No. of seasons: 1
- No. of episodes: 14 (9 unaired)

Production
- Executive producer: David Milch
- Producers: Allan Arkush; Andrew Gottlieb
- Cinematography: Gerald Perry Finnerman
- Editor: Alicia Hirsch
- Running time: 95 mins. (approx)
- Production company: MTM Enterprises

Original release
- Network: ABC
- Release: April 9 – April 30, 1990

Capital News is an American drama television series that aired on ABC in 1990. Starring Lloyd Bridges, Helen Slater, and William Russ. Capital News was created by David Milch and Christian Williams.

== Synopsis ==
The series focused on the editorial staff and writers of the Washington, D.C.–based daily newspaper The Washington Capital (a fictional publication inspired by the actual Washington Post). It was produced by MTM Enterprises.

The series consisted of one TV movie (also considered as the pilot) and twelve regular episodes, of which only three were shown on its initial run in the United States, after which ABC canceled the series. However, at least in Germany, Canada, Hong Kong, the Netherlands and the UK, all 13 episodes were shown on television in 1990 and 1991.

== Cast ==
- Mark Blum as Edison King
- Lloyd Bridges as Jonathan Joseph "Jo Jo" Turner
- Christian Clemenson as Todd Lunden, reporter
- Chelsea Field as Cassy Swann, reporter
- Kurt Fuller as Miles Plato
- Charles Levin as Vinnie DiSalvo
- Richard Murphy as Richie Fineberg
- Wendell Pierce as Conrad White, a black reporter assigned to the local desk
- Daniel Roebuck as Haskell Epstein
- William Russ as Redmond Dunne, metro reporter
- Helen Slater as Anne McKenna
- Michael Woods as Clay Gibson
- Jenny Wright as Doreen Duncan
- Luke Edwards as Clay Gibson jr.

Recurring

- Shelley Long as Kelly
- Matthew Lillard as Sid

== Episodes ==
| No. | Title | Directed by | Written by | Original release date |
|---|---|---|---|---|
| 1 | "Pilot" | Allan Arkush | David Milch & Christian Williams | April 9, 1990 |
| 2 | "Pilot" | Allan Arkush | David Milch & Christian Williams | April 9, 1990 |
| 3 | "Finished?...Not Dunne" | Mark Tinker | Story by : Robin Green & Christian Williams; Teleplay by : Nick Harding & Gardner Stern | April 16, 1990 |
| 4 | "Blues for Mr. White" | Arthur Allan Seidelman | Story by : David Milch & Christian Williams; Teleplay by : Mark Levin | April 23, 1990 |
| 5 | "Tapes of Wrath" | Dan Lerner | Story by : Carla Hall; Teleplay by : Christian Williams & Robin Green | April 30, 1990 |
| 6 | "D.C. Tree" | N/A | Story by : David Milch & Christian Williams; Teleplay by : Christian Williams & Robin Green | Unaired, (broadcast 1991 in UK, Canada, Hong Kong, Germany and Netherlands) |
| 7 | "King for a Day" | N/A | Elsa Wier | Unaired, (broadcast 1991 in UK, Canada, Hong Kong, Germany and Netherlands) |
| 8 | "Bye Hooker, Bye Crook" | Win Phelps | Eric Goodman | Unaired, (broadcast 1991 in UK, Canada, Hong Kong, Germany and Netherlands) |
| 9 | "The Last Supper" | N/A | Story by : Gardner Stern & Tom Zito; Teleplay by : David Milch & Christian Williams | Unaired, (broadcast 1991 in UK, Canada, Hong Kong, Germany and Netherlands) |
| 10 | "Shell Game" | N/A | Rudy Maxa | Unaired, (broadcast 1991 in UK, Canada, Hong Kong, Germany and Netherlands) |
| 11 | "Here Comes the Sun" | Mark Tinker | Steve Wasserman & Jessica Klein | Unaired, (broadcast 1991 in UK, Canada, Hong Kong, Germany and Netherlands) |
| 12 | "The Best Little Whorehouse in Virginia" | Michael Fresco | Jim Macak | Unaired, (broadcast 1991 in UK, Canada, Hong Kong, Germany and Netherlands) |
| 13 | "Swanns and Drakes" | John Whitesell | Story by : David Milch & Gardner Stern; Teleplay by : Christian Williams & Robin Green | Unaired, (broadcast 1991 in UK, Canada, Hong Kong, Germany and Netherlands) |
| 14 | "A Man's Home is His Hassle" | N/A | Story by : Jeanne Meyers; Teleplay by : Christian Williams & Robin Green | Unaired, (broadcast 1991 in UK, Canada, Hong Kong, Germany and Netherlands) |
