= Robert Trebor =

American actor (1953–2025)

- Born: Robert Alan Schenkman; June 7, 1953; Philadelphia, Pennsylvania, U.S
- Died: March 11, 2025 (aged 71); Los Angeles, California, U.S.
- Other names: Bob Trebor, Robert Alan Trebor
- Occupation: Actor
- Years active: 1959–2016

Robert Alan Trebor (né Schenkman; June 7, 1953 – March 11, 2025) was an American character actor, known for starring as Salmoneus in the television series Hercules: The Legendary Journeys and Xena: Warrior Princess.

== Life and career ==
=== Background ===
Trebor was born and grew up in Northeast Philadelphia. He was of Jewish descent. He first showed signs of interest in acting around age 13. He was soon taking acting classes and participating in local theater groups. He also won several filmmaking awards from Kodak short film competitions, and the local ABC Philadelphia and PBS affiliates for a short black and white film called Communicate!?.

His first lead role on the stage was as Finch in How to Succeed in Business Without Really Trying for the St. Joseph's Summer Music Theatre Festival. He also won several national awards from Scholastic Magazines for writing film and theatre reviews. One of his award-winning reviews was for John Frankenheimer's The Fixer; years later he would appear in Frankenheimer's 1986 film 52 Pick-Up. After a brief focus on oratory, he returned to acting, majoring in theater at Northwestern University. He returned to Philadelphia to star with Bill Irwin in a revival of George Gershwin's Strike Up The Band for the inaugural season of the American Music Theatre Festival at the historic Walnut Street Theatre. The pseudonym he chose for himself has the particularity of being a palindrome.

Trebor played the Son of Sam killer in Out of the Darkness. He plays a killer in the 1987 American comedy horror film My Demon Lover. On television, after playing Waylin the slave in Hercules and the Lost Kingdom, the second of five TV movies, Trebor rose to fame playing the merchant Salmoneus, a character originating on Hercules: The Legendary Journeys and making occasional crossovers to sister show Xena: Warrior Princess. He appeared in the 2016 Coen Brothers film Hail, Caesar!.

In 2007 Trebor performed in the one-man show The Return of Brother Theodore. The Los Angeles Weekly gave the show its prized "GO" recommendation and said, "actor Robert Trebor reincarnates Gottlieb in a 45-minute late-night solo performance that paints Brother Theodore's belligerent reflections on a twisted life with broad yet powerful comedic strokes." The production was nominated by The LA Weekly for Best Solo Performance of 2007. Trebor starred as the Russian Major Viktor Davidykov in the drama Ravensridge by TS Cook. His performance was praised by Variety.

Trebor died of sepsis on March 11, 2025, at the age of 71. He had been diagnosed with leukemia in 2012. He was interred at Hollywood Forever Cemetery.

=== Author ===
Trebor was the author of The Haircut Who Would Be King which parodies Donald Trump and his relationship with Vladimir Putin.

== Filmography ==
- Face of Fire (1959)
- Magnum Force (1973) – Reporter (uncredited)
- Gorp (1980) – Rabbi Blowitz
- The First Time (1983) – Joel
- Turk 182 (1985) – Copy Boy
- The Purple Rose of Cairo (1985) – Reporter
- The Sex O'Clock News (1985) – Mr. Rajah
- Out of the Darkness (1985) (TV) – David Berkowitz
- 52 Pick-Up (1986) – Leo Franks
- Making Mr. Right (1987) – Tux Salesman
- My Demon Lover (1987) – Charles
- Talk Radio (1988) – Jeffrey Fisher / Francine
- Universal Soldier (1992) – Motel Owner
- The Nutt House (1992) – Buddy
- Hercules and the Lost Kingdom (1994) (TV) – Waylin
- The Shadow (1994) – Harried Man in Taxi (uncredited)
- Hercules: The Legendary Journeys (1995–1999) (TV series) – Salmoneus / B.S. Hollingsfoffer, Studio Head
- Xena: Warrior Princess (1995–2001) (TV series) – Salmoneus / Marco / Lord Seltzer
- Dying on the Edge (2001) – Mel Weiner
- Wedding Daze (2004) (TV) – Rabbi Feldman
- Jiminy Glick in Lalawood (2004) – Jay Schiffer
- Raise Your Voice (2004) – Mr. Wesson
- Meet Market (2004) – Director Dick
- The Devil's Rejects (2005) – Marty Walker (uncredited)
- Hail, Caesar! (2016) – Producer of 'Hail, Caesar!'
