= Barry Pullman =

- Occupations: television writer, television producer
- Years active: 1990–present

Barry Pullman is an American television writer and television producer.

His credits include Against the Law, Twin Peaks, Nightmare Cafe, Reasonable Doubts, Hercules: The Legendary Journeys, Cracker, Bloodline, Roswell, Saved and New Amsterdam. He was also a producer on the latter three series .
