= Christian Williams =

American novelist

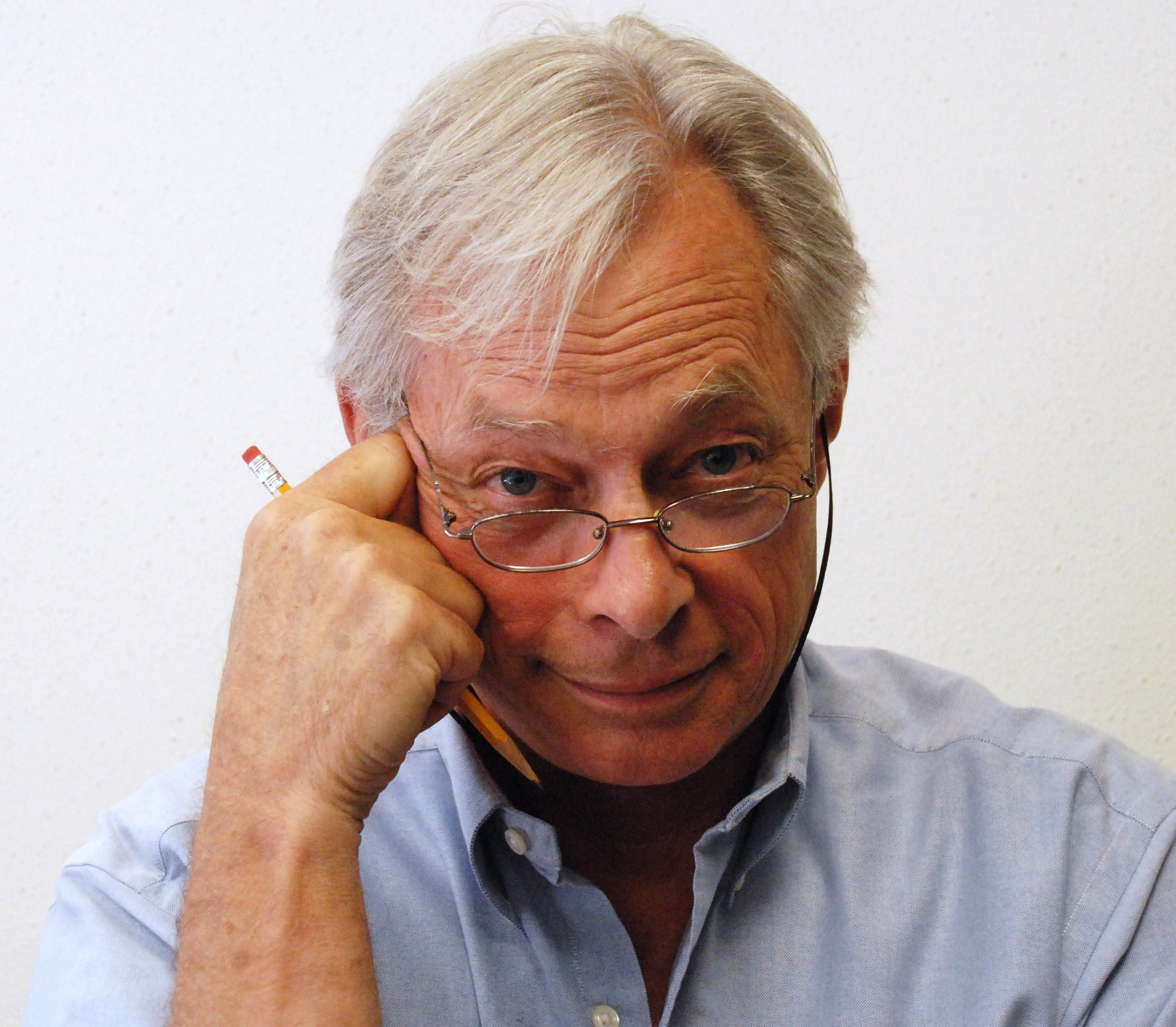
- Williams in 2008
- Born: July 9, 1943 (age 83); Brooklyn, New York, U.S.
- Education: Rahway (N.J.) High School
- Alma mater: Norwich University
- Occupations: American journalist; television writer; yachtsman
- Known for: Part of Bob Woodward's investigative team, created the TV drama Capital News and wrote the Ted Turner biography Lead, Follow or Get Out of the Way
- Spouse: Tracy Olmstead Williams

Christian Williams (born July 9, 1943) is an American journalist, television writer, and yachtsman. A former editor of The Washington Post during the Watergate era, he later created two television dramas and is the author of six books including the Ted Turner biography Lead, Follow or Get Out of the Way.

== Journalism ==
Williams joined The Washington Post in 1972 as an assistant editor of the Style Section. When the cast and crew of the Robert Redford movie All The President's Men descended on the newsroom to conduct research for the film, Williams served as the assignment editor on the article about the experience behind the scenes. "It was the age of cool. And suddenly we were cool," Williams said. "You could put out nine calls on deadline at 4 o'clock in the afternoon and get nine callbacks in a half an hour. People were paying attention."

He was arts editor at the paper from 1976 to 1980. In 1981, he was nominated for the Pulitzer Prize for a series on Isidore Zimmerman, wrongly imprisoned for 25 years. In 1984, he joined Bob Woodward's investigative team.

== Television ==
In 1986, ABC produced a three-hour movie of the week, Under Siege, written by Bob Woodward, Richard Harwood and Williams based on their terrorism reporting. After Williams and Woodward penned an episode of the NBC crime drama Hill Street Blues, Williams left the Post and moved to Hollywood.

With David Milch, Williams created Capital News, an ABC drama based on a morning newspaper in Washington, D.C. Williams also created Hercules: The Legendary Journeys which became a worldwide hit in syndication. He was not involved in the production of the series. Williams was co-executive producer of the HBO funeral-home drama Six Feet Under when the show was nominated for Outstanding Drama Series in 2002.

== Sailing ==
Williams crewed for Ted Turner aboard Tenacious for the 1979 Fastnet race, which was the event of the largest yacht racing disaster in modern times where out of 303 boats, only 86 yachts finished, of which Williams was aboard the race-winning boat. Sailors experienced Force 10 conditions which caused much destruction across the fleet and eighteen sailors died.

Williams has sailed from California to Hawaii three times, single-handed. The first voyage of Thelonious, an Ericson 32–3, took twenty days there and twenty-eight days back. At age 74 he repeated the solo round trip of 5,000 miles on Thelonious II, a 1984 Ericson 38, with seventeen days outbound and twenty-two days return. In 2021, he completed a third single-handed voyage (his second on Thelonious II) from Los Angeles to Honolulu (nineteen days) and back (twenty-six days) at 78 years old—the video of this journey contains Williams's reflections upon the nature of aging.

Video documentaries of his sailing adventures have more than 12 million views on the YouTube channel ChristianWilliamsYachting.

== Books ==
Williams chronicled the founding of CNN in the 1981 Ted Turner biography Lead, Follow or Get Out of the Way. Williams' 2016 book "Alone Together: Sailing Solo to Hawaii and Beyond" recounts his solo sail two years earlier to Hawaii and back in his 32-foot sloop "Thelonious".

Philosophy of Sailing: Offshore in Search of the Universe, published in 2018, attempts to apply techniques of phenomenology and other forms of inquiry to the experience of isolation and solitude. The book is listed number 9 of the top 20 sailing books of all time.

His novel, Rarotonga, (East Wind Press, 2019), explores the attempt of a controversial millionaire to flee family, the IRS and a murder charge in search of paradise alone on his luxury sailing yacht.

Introduction to Sailing, (East Wind Press, 2022), was conceived as an original audiobook of sailing instruction on Audible.com.

The Long Voyage Home: An Autobiography with 20 Sailboats, (East Wind Press, 2025), chronicles Williams’ evolution from newspaper editor to television producer to long-distance solo sailor.
