= Hercules and the Circle of Fire =

1994 television film

- Release poster
- Written by: Andrew Dettmann; Barry Pullman; Daniel Truly
- Directed by: Doug Lefler

Original release
- Release: 31 October 1994

Related
- Hercules and the Lost Kingdom; Hercules in the Underworld

Hercules and the Circle of Fire is the third television movie in the syndicated fantasy series Hercules: The Legendary Journeys.

In the film, when all the Earth's fire begins to go out, Hercules and Deianeira must go in search for fire to stop the world from becoming frozen.

== Plot ==
While walking through a snowy mountain top, Hercules finds a woman in the cold and goes to help her. He sees Zeus in a cave, and a rock closes over the entrance. The woman then calls out to him, freezes and explodes. Hercules wakes from a dream.

The next day, Hercules and young man walk through a cave filled with corpses. They are all men from the young man's village; the witch who guards the Fountain of Youth killed them for their youth and strength. At the heart of the cave, they find a chained, old woman. Hercules is soon attacked by the man, who is actually a warlock. The warlock says that he will now have Hercules' strength. The two fight, and the warlock appears invincible, until Hercules notices a beating heart among the items in the cave. Hercules plunges a knife into the heart and kills the warlock. With the warlock now dead, the old woman reverts to her true form, that of a young woman. Hercules frees the woman from her chains and takes water from the fountain. The fountain then begins to boil and starts dissolving everything in the cave. Hercules grabs the woman and they leave the cave. Hercules thinks that the water will cure Chiron, a satyr he accidentally injured.

Prometheus frozen.

Later, at Chiron's house, Hercules gives him the water and he drinks it. The wound, however, worsens. Meanwhile, all over the village fires are being inexplicably extinguished. Hercules approaches Hera's temple which still has fire. A woman named Deianeira is trying to persuade a priest there to share the fire. The priest refuses. Hercules kicks down the door, Hera's priests fight him, he beats them. However, the fire cannot be shared; Hera has stolen the Eternal Torch, planning to kill mankind once and for all. Humans cannot survive without fire, and if Hercules does not get the Torch back, all life will die. Later, Deianeira comes to Chiron for help. Chiron says that Hercules can help her. She says that they need to talk to Prometheus, so Hercules and her set off. They eventually find Prometheus frozen. Hercules and Deianeira later travel onto Mount Ethion, where Hera has the Torch. En route, they meet Phaedra, a girl who points them down a path where Hercules is attacked by giant Antaeus. Aided by Deianeira, Hercules kills Antaeus.

They later meet Phaedra again, who tells them to go to a fork in the road. Not trusting her now, they take the left fork and arrive at a point where Hera has removed a bridge to a gorge they have to cross. Hercules says that they can continue if they use the rope which still remains. Deianeira reluctantly agrees. While staying at an inn, Phaedra tricks them both into splitting up. Hercules walks through the snowy mountain top of Mount Ethion, just like in his dream. He follows Phaedra, who leads him to Zeus. Zeus reveals that Hera has put the Torch in the center of a ring of fire; the fire has the power to kill immortality. Hercules goes and finds Deianeira on the mountain. He and Zeus battle it out while Zeus says that he is trying to save Hercules. Hercules asks Zeus if he cares about humanity. Zeus replies that he does, but he cares for Hercules more. Hercules responds that he loves him too. Zeus accepts what Hercules must do and lets him go. Hercules goes through the fire and retrieves the Torch, which he throws. The Torch lands in Prometheus's home, waking him. Fire begins to return.

As Hercules lays dying in the circle, Zeus yells for Hera not to harm Hercules or he will haunt her into eternity, and even threatening to give up his own immortality. Hera allows Zeus to pass through and help Hercules. Before leaving, Hercules picks up a branch and makes a torch. Hercules takes the torch to Chiron's house and asks him to step inside a circle of straw. Chiron complies and Hercules lights the straw with the torch. The flames burn away his immortality but heal the wound.

== Cast ==
- Kevin Sorbo as Hercules
- Anthony Quinn as Zeus
- Tawny Kitaen as Deianeira
- Mark Ferguson as Prometheus
- Kevin Atkinson as Cheiron
- Stephanie Barrett as Phaedra
- Kerry Gallagher as Amalthea

== Production ==
This movie is loosely based on the myth of Prometheus. The basic plot concept of Prometheus being captured is similar to the first season Xena: Warrior Princess episode "Prometheus", although in that episode mankind is robbed of the gift of healing, not fire. The clip of Prometheus was used for the opening title sequence of the television series.

== See also ==
- List of films featuring Hercules
