= Hercules and the Lost Kingdom =

1994 television film

- Release poster
- Written by: Christian Williams
- Directed by: Harley Cokeliss

Original release
- Release: 2 May 1994

Related
- Hercules and the Amazon Women; Hercules and the Circle of Fire

Hercules and the Lost Kingdom is the second television movie in the syndicated fantasy series Hercules: The Legendary Journeys.

In the film, Hercules comes to the aid of a young woman who is seeking the lost city of Troy. Eventually, Hercules leads her to a camp of refugees from the city, which has been taken over by Hera's Blue Priests. Hercules helps the refugees take back the city.

== Plot ==
Three foot messengers are running along the riverside, one of them stops to take a drink from the river. As he stoops down to quench his thirst, a female figure composed of water rises out of the river and pulls him under, drowning him. While the other two men run on, one man is hit by a boulder and killed, and the remaining man escapes.

Elsewhere, a young woman is collecting water when the ground begins to shake. She flees back to the village to warn them that a giant is coming. Gargan the Giant follows the woman to the village and rips the roof of the tavern. Hercules presents himself to Gargan and the giant challenges Hercules to a fight. Hercules goes outside and he beats Gargan. As the village celebrates the Gargan's defeat, the exhausted messenger from earlier arrives in the village, and asks for Hercules' help. He explains to Hercules that his people have been driven from their city, the lost city of Troy.

Zeus appears and Hercules asks him if he will help him. He asks his father how to find Troy and is told that Hera vanished it, and to find it Hercules must find the one true compass which will point the way to Troy. Hercules heads off to find the compass, he finds a tribe of men preparing to sacrifice a young virgin woman to their water god. Hercules saves the girl from being sacrificed, while unknowingly being watched by a mysterious robed figure. The woman tells Hercules that her name is Deianeira. Later in the evening as they camp for the night, Deianeira tells him a story that she is the daughter of a King. She sees the dark figure and asks who he is and why she is being followed, but the figure does not answer. Later Hercules and Deianeira arrive at the slave market looking for King Omphale of Lydia, the last person to have possessed the compass. But the King has since died, and in order to get to see the Queen, Hercules sells himself as a slave, and the Queen buys him. Deianeira gets attacked by some men, but the figure in the dark robe saves her and tells her to follow her destiny. After spending the night with the Queen Hercules gets the compass, and he and Deianeira continue searching for Troy.

Hercules and Deianeira head on to Troy, they arrive at the ocean and the figure standing on the cliffs summons a sea serpent to do Hera's bidding. It swallows Hercules and Deianeira, but Hercules kills the monster from inside and they are washed up on the shore. Deianeira sees Troy in the distance and tells Hercules that she now remembers this is where she is from. Deianeira and Hercules get caught in a trap and taken to the king. The king is ill and explains that Deianeira is his daughter. He tells her that Hera wanted her sacrificed as a child, but that he couldn't do it and sent her away for safety. As punishment, the Cult of the Blue Priests took over the city, leaving the citizens in exile in the woods. He tells her to rule them well, and then dies.

Hercules tutors the people of Troy and prepares them to battle to take back Troy. Deianeira realizes that the people cannot beat the Cult of the Blue Priests and goes looking for the Blue Priest. The people notice that Deianeira is missing and Hercules and the people use a tunnel to get into the city. As the people fight the cult members Hercules goes looking for Deianeira, he finds her about to be sacrificed to Hera and saves her. The Blue Priest and Hercules fight and Hercules cuts off the Priest's head. A huge storm approaches, and Zeus tells Hercules that Hera is coming for Deianeira, Hercules saves her and Hera takes Hercules instead. As Deianeira is crowned Queen of Troy, Hercules is thrown down from the sky elsewhere. A man approaches him asking him for help, Hercules agrees and the two men walk off to the next adventure.

== Cast ==
- Kevin Sorbo as Hercules
- Renee O'Connor as Deianeira
- Anthony Quinn as Zeus
- Robert Trebor as Waylin
- Eric Close as Telamon
- Elizabeth Hawthorne as Queen Omphale
- Nathaniel Lees as Blue Priest
- Onno Boelee as Gargan the Giant

== Production ==
=== Casting ===
Waylin (Robert Trebor) was originally intended to become a recurring character in the television series, but the producers felt that the character runs its course in the movie and had limited potential after, so the character of money-making Salmoneus was created for Trebor instead.

This is Renee O'Connor's first appearance in the shared Hercules-Xena universe

Elizabeth Hawthorne, who played Queen Omphale, went on to play Hercules' mother in the TV series.

Nathaniel Lees went on to have numerous different roles in Hercules: The Legendary Journeys, Xena: Warrior Princess and Young Hercules.

=== Characters ===
The "Deianeira" character (played by Renee O'Connor) is not the same character as Hercules' future wife Deianeira (portrayed by Tawny Kitaen) in the succeeding movies/series, also in the mythology the real name of Trojan King Laomedon's daughter is Hesione.

== See also ==
- List of films featuring Hercules
