= Hercules in the Maze of the Minotaur =

1994 television film

- Release poster
- Written by: Andrew Dettmann; Daniel Truly
- Directed by: Josh Becker

Original release
- Release: 14 November 1994

Related
- Hercules in the Underworld; The Wrong Path

Hercules in the Maze of the Minotaur is the fifth and final television movie in the syndicated fantasy series Hercules: The Legendary Journeys.

In the film, Hercules has given up his days of traveling and has settled down to spend some time with his family. When a distant village is threatened by an unseen monster, Hercules is called upon to help save the village from the monster.

== Plot ==
Two men search for buried treasure in a forest. Pacing out the step given with a map, they discover a cave overgrown with bushes. They break through the plants and enter the cave. There, they find a wooden door. When they try to get through it, a Minotaur breaks through the door and chases after them. One man is captured and the other flees as the monster tells him to bring Hercules. It has been some time since Hercules has been going on adventures, but he is content that he has now settled down with Deianeira to raise his children. While working on his farm, Hercules sees his sons fighting and convinces them to stop. Hercules is later working in the stable, when Zeus appears. Zeus gives him a scale from a sea serpent.

At night, the children ask Hercules to tell them a story. Ilea asks for the story about when he and Deianeira first met. Hercules complies. After the children fall asleep, Hercules and Deianeira retire to bed.

The following day, Hercules is working in the stables and Iolaus jumps down upon him. The two eventually go inside to get a drink, Iolaus tells Hercules that he met a man who taught him new moves that allow smaller men to overpower a bigger one. Hercules at first refuses to fight Iolaus, but is eventually persuaded. While attacking Iolaus, Hercules is initially overpowered. However, Hercules soon defeats Iolaus. Deianeira later tells Iolaus that Hercules has been distracted and stir-crazy. The man who survived the Minotaur arrives at the stable looking for Hercules and tells him what happened. Hercules is reluctant to help, saying that his place is with his family. That evening, Deianeria says that he should not stop being Hercules, not for her or the children, and that he needs to go. The next day, he and Iolaus set off for the village of Alturia. En route, they talk about different adventures. Zeus temporarily appears to mention when they fought on mount Ethion.

Hercules and Iolaus reach Alturia, which does not seem to be distressed. They enter a tavern, talk to a woman, and end up fighting men who do not believe that Hercules is really Hercules.

Later, the Minotaur kills three of the men from the tavern. Thinking that Hercules killed the men, the villagers chase him and Iolaus. Iolaus and a villager are eventually sucked into the ground. The man who had asked for Hercules's help arrives and takes Hercules to the Minotaur's cave. Zeus appears and reveals that he created the Minotaur, a mortal man transformed into a monster for turning people against the gods. The Minotaur wants to kill Hercules in vengeance against Zeus. Zeus says that he cannot kill the Minotaur and asks Hercules to do it on his behalf.

In the cave's maze, Hercules finds the Minotaur. In the ensuing fight, Hercules subdues the monster. Before Hercules can deliver the killing blow, the Minotaur reveals that he is his brother Gryphus. Hercules then feels unable to kill him. The Minotaur attacks Hercules, who continues to refuse to kill him. The Minotaur then threatens Iolaus, and Hercules ends up killing him by kicking him onto a stalagmite as Zeus arrives. As Gryphus lies dying, Hercules says that he is sorry that Zeus had to lose a son. Zeus says that Gryphus was lost long before. When Gryphus begs them not to let him die that way, Zeus changes him back to human form. Hercules helps Iolaus and the villager being held in the maze.

== Cast ==
- Kevin Sorbo as Hercules
- Anthony Quinn as Zeus
- Michael Hurst as Iolaus
- Tawny Kitaen as Deianira
- Anthony Ray Parker as Gryphus (Minotaur)
- Al Chalk as Gryphus (voice)
- Rose McIver as Ilea
- Paul McIver as Aeson
- Simon Lewthwaite as Klonus
- Marise Wipani as Maiden

== See also ==
- List of films featuring Hercules
