= Hercules and the Amazon Women =

1994 television film

- Written by: Andrew Dettmann, Jule Selbo and Daniel Truly
- Directed by: Bill L. Norton

Original release
- Release: 25 April 1994

Related
- Hercules and the Lost Kingdom

Hercules and the Amazon Women is the first television movie in the syndicated fantasy series Hercules: The Legendary Journeys and marked the debut of Kevin Sorbo as the titular character Hercules and co-starred Anthony Quinn, Michael Hurst, Roma Downey and Lucy Lawless.

In the film, a village of only men comes to seek Hercules' aid in defeating a band of mysterious creatures on the eve of Iolaus' wedding. Hercules discovers these "creatures" are really the women of the village who have split with their misogynistic men and aligned themselves with Hera.

== Plot ==
In the woods, creatures attack three men. Two men die, while one, the Gargarean Pithus, flees.

While walking through the woods, Hercules and Iolaus stumble upon a little girl crying alone near an altar. The girl soon transforms into Hydra. Hercules tells Iolaus to grab the torch from the altar, cuts off the Hydra's heads and burns it, killing it. A peacock feather remains in the destroyed Hydra's place, indicating that Hera is responsible for the monster.

Later, at a dinner with Hercules, his mother Alcmene, Iolaus, and Iolaus's bride-to-be Ania, Pithus arrives, introduces himself and says that his village is being attacked by "creatures". Hercules agrees to help. Pithus, Hercules and Iolaus go to the village. According to Pithus, the "creatures" stole all the women there. In the forest, they are ambushed by the beasts. Iolaus chases after one but is fatally injured in a fight, and dies. Hercules is then surrounded by more 'beasts'. Two of them approach him with spears. One stops them.

Hercules is taken captive by the "creatures", who are actually masked Amazon Women Warriors, and led through a village full of women. Hippolyta, their queen, says that he is there to defeat them. Hercules denies this. Using a magic candle, Hippolyta turns Hercules into a baby, saying that she will show him what he is really like. While reverting to infant form, Hercules sees his youth and times when he has been told by people how to behave toward women. After returning to adult state and realizing that Hippolyta is right and that his attitude towards women is wrong, he says that he can change. She, however, thinks that men cannot change. Hippolyta goes to consult with Hera, who tells her to lead an attack on the village.

Hercules escapes from the Amazons and warns the village's men of the forthcoming attack. He prepares them for when the women arrive. The women ride into the village and order the men to remove their clothes. The men tell the women to sit and talk with them for a while. Pithus's wife enters her home, and her son Franco asks if she really is his mother. Franco says that he often dreams about her but she has no face. She removes her mask and shows her face to Franco. Hercules stands up to Hippolyta and kisses her. The two eventually have sex. The following day, the women are still with the men. The Amazons return to their city. Hera tells Hippolyta that Hercules has tricked her and orders her to attack the village again, this time killing all the men and boys. When Hippolyta refuses, Hera possesses her and orders the women to attack the village.

Hercules stops Hippolyta and realizes what is happening. A fight ensues. Pithus eventually arrives and saves Hercules from a killing blow. Hera grabs Pithus and cuts his throat, which ignites Hercules's fury enough to best her. Hercules is about to deal the fatal blow, but stops as he realises that he would be killing Hippolyta, not Hera. Hercules flees, but Hera follows, goading him, and eventually cornering him at the top of a waterfall. He says that he is willing die for Hippolyta and that he could not live his life without her. Upon hearing this Hera runs Hippolyta's body over the edge of the waterfall, killing her.

Hercules returns to the City of Amazons and retrieves Hippolyta's candle. Zeus appears and reveals that the candle does not work in the way Hercules wants it to. Hercules replies that Zeus could. Hercules eventually persuades a reluctant Zeus. Zeus blows out the candle and Hercules is taken back to the night of the dinner. Ania sees Pithus outside the window and Hercules goes to tell him that the village does not need his help. He explains that all the men need to do is treat the women with respect and things will sort themselves out. Pithus returns to the village, and when the women come, the men sort out their respective problems with them.

== Cast ==
- Kevin Sorbo as Hercules
- Anthony Quinn as Zeus
- Roma Downey as Hippolyta
- Michael Hurst as Iolaus
- Lloyd Scott as Pithus
- Lucy Lawless as Lysia
- Christopher Brougham as Lethan
- Jennifer Ludlam as Alcmene
- Rose McIver as Girl and Hydra

== See also ==
- List of films featuring Hercules
