= Hercules in the Underworld =

1994 television film

- Release poster
- Written by: Andrew Dettmann; Daniel Truly
- Directed by: Bill L. Norton

Original release
- Release: 7 November 1994

Related
- Hercules and the Circle of Fire; Hercules in the Maze of the Minotaur

Hercules in the Underworld is the fourth television movie in the syndicated fantasy series Hercules: The Legendary Journeys.

In the film, Hercules is finally a happy family man with his wife Deianeira, two young sons Aeson and Clonus, daughter Ilea and in-living centaur Nessus. When villagers begin disappearing it is discovered that they had fallen through a crack in the earth which goes straight to Hades. Hercules once again comes to the rescue and faces one of his most difficult challenges, and must prove himself as a man as well as a god.

== Plot ==
In the village of Gryphon, the ground opens up. A gaseous vapor pours out of the fissure, and, in a flash of light, kills two men near it. Meanwhile, in another village, a man challenges people to fight the boxer Eryx. After many die fighting him, Hercules learns of what is happening. He challenges, fights and eventually kills Eryx. Hercules then receives a peacock feather, Hera's symbol. Hercules visits Hera's temple, wanting a truce; Hera refuses, so he destroys her temple. Zeus appears and convinces Hercules to stop. At home, Deianeira tends to Hercules's wounds, and they have sex.

The following day, Iole, a young woman, comes looking for Hercules and faints. Iole says that she is from Gryphon and that they need Hercules's help. At night, Iole tells Deianeira that she thought that she saw something outside her window. Deianeira checks outside and finds centaur Nessus drunk. He says that Hercules cannot resist Iole's beauty. She defends Hercules's loyalty and slaps Nessus, but starts to doubt when sees Iole sleeping naked. In the morning, Hercules, Iole and Nessus leave for Gryphon. Before leaving, Iole gives Deianeira a necklace to thank her for looking after her the night before. Deianeira goes to a market where a woman recognizes the necklace; it is given to women whose men are to be killed by Neurian maidens, who are trained in the art of seduction. Deianeira goes after Hercules to warn him, finds the three at a river bank and tells Iole to leave. Hercules, who already knew that Iole was a Neurian maiden, reassures Deianeira of his love for her. Hercules and Iole then continue to Gryphon. Nessus, who is to escort Deianeira home, however, eventually tries to rape her. Hercules notices this and shoots an arrow at Nessus. While dying, Nessus tells Deianeira that the cloak his blood drenches is powerful and will prevent Hercules from being unfaithful. She gives the cape to Hercules and tells him to wear it and think of her.

Hercules and Iole continue their journey. Iole uses her power of seduction to stop a raging man from causing a fight. One day, she swims naked in a lake while a man, whom she mistakes for Hercules, watches her. She then stops Hercules from killing Lycastus, a young man from Gryphon who attacks anyone that he considers a rival for Iole's heart. When they arrive at Gryphon, the fissure is stronger than ever. Gryphon is full of fire, destruction and corpses. Hercules approaches the fissure and sees spirits coming out from deep within. Zeus appears and reveals that it is the Underworld, where Cerberus, its guard dog, has gotten loose and is causing havoc. Iole tries to seduce Hercules when he says that he cannot help Gryphon. Resisting Iole, Hercules puts on the cloak before going home, but it nearly kills him and displays Hera's peacock-sign. Hercules jumps into the Underworld yelling Hera's name. There, Hercules meets Charon, whom he forces to transport him across the River Styx. On the other side, Hercules finds Cerberus' collar, enters a doorway and vanishes.

Meanwhile, Deianeira, distraught by the thought that she caused Hercules's death, goes to a cliff top; while standing there, she has a vision of Hercules, reaches out to him and falls to the rocks below. After being attacked by monsters, Hercules meets Eryx and some other people he sent to Hades, makes them fight each other and then sees Nessus, who taunts him by revealing, via a portal, that Deianeira is dead. Hercules ask to watch it again. When Nessus complies, Hercules jumps through the portal into the Elysian fields, where Deianeira has no memory of him. Hades appears and says that Hercules erased her misery, along with her memories. Hercules begs Deianeria to remember him and their children and kisses her. Her memories then return. Hercules makes a deal with Hades: if he can capture Cerberus, then Deianeira can return with him. Hercules goes after Cerberus and finds Hades' men trying and failing to capture him. Hercules eventually gains Cerberus' trust. Once Cerberus is chained, Deianeira appears, and the fissure closes. The villagers thank Hercules for helping them, and he and Deianeira go home.

== Cast ==
- Kevin Sorbo as Hercules
- Anthony Quinn as Zeus
- Tawny Kitaen as Deianeira
- Marley Shelton as Iole
- Cliff Curtis as Nessus
- Jorge González as Eryx the Boxer
- John McKee as Fake Eryx the Boxer
- Tim Balme as Lycastus
- Michael Hurst as Aelus/Charon
- Mark Ferguson as Hades
- Rose McIver as Ilea
- Paul McIver as Aeson
- Simon Lewthwaite as Klonus
- Rose Glucina as Althea

== See also ==
- List of films featuring Hercules
