= Hercules: The Legendary Journeys =

American fantasy television series (1995–1999)

- Opening sequence logo
- Genre: Action-adventure; Heroic fantasy; Comedy drama
- Created by: Christian Williams; Robert Tapert
- Based on: Heracles
- Starring: Kevin Sorbo; Michael Hurst
- Theme music composer: Joseph LoDuca
- Composer: Joseph LoDuca
- Country of origin: United States
- Original language: English
- No. of seasons: 6
- No. of episodes: 111 (+ 5 pilot television movies) (list of episodes)

Production
- Producers: Sam Raimi; Bernadette Joyce
- Production location: New Zealand
- Running time: 41–44 minutes
- Production companies: Renaissance Pictures; Universal Television

Original release
- Network: Syndication
- Release: January 16, 1995 – November 22, 1999

Related
- Xena: Warrior Princess; Young Hercules; Hercules and Xena – The Animated Movie: The Battle for Mount Olympus

Hercules: The Legendary Journeys is an American fantasy television series filmed in New Zealand, based on the tales of the classical Greek culture hero Heracles (Hercules was his Roman analogue). Starring Kevin Sorbo as Hercules and Michael Hurst as Iolaus, it was produced from January 16, 1995, to November 22, 1999. It ran for six seasons, producing action figures and other memorabilia as it became one of the highest-rated syndicated television shows in the world at that time. It has aired on Once Channel, Sky One, 5, Heroes & Icons, and Horror.

It was preceded by five TV movies in 1994, with the same major characters, and was part of Universal Television's Action Pack. They are, in order of appearance: Hercules and the Amazon Women, Hercules and the Lost Kingdom, Hercules and the Circle of Fire, Hercules in the Underworld, and Hercules in the Maze of the Minotaur, the last of which served mostly as a "clip show" of the previous movies as a lead up to the series. The show was cancelled midway through filming of the sixth season, and only a total of eight episodes were produced after Sorbo initially declined to renew a three-year extension contract to continue his role as Hercules.

== Plot ==
Kevin Sorbo as Hercules (left) and Michael Hurst as Iolaus

"This is the story of a time long ago, a time of myth and legend, when the ancient gods were petty and cruel, and they plagued mankind with suffering. Only one man dared to challenge their power: Hercules!

Hercules possessed a strength the world had never seen, a strength surpassed only by the power of his heart. He journeyed the earth, battling the minions of his wicked stepmother Hera, the all-powerful queen of the gods.

But wherever there is evil, whenever an innocent would suffer, there would be Hercules!"

— Opening narration.

The series is set in a fantasy version of ancient Greece not precisely located in historical time. The show also has a mixture of Oriental, Egyptian and Medieval elements in various episodes. The series stars Kevin Sorbo as Hercules and regularly features Michael Hurst as his sidekick Iolaus. Rotating as Hercules' other regular companion, particularly in earlier seasons, is Salmoneus (Robert Trebor), a wheeler-dealer ever looking to make a quick drachma.

Typical plot lines involve Hercules and Iolaus saving rustic villagers from monsters, evil warlords, or the often selfish whims of the gods. There was also comedy and episodes often had "in-jokes" about modern themes.

In the earlier episodes as mentioned in the show's opening title, Hercules' main nemesis is his evil stepmother Hera, the powerful queen of the gods who seeks to destroy Hercules using various monsters and helping her various followers because he is a reminder of her husband Zeus' infidelity. As the series progressed, a wider range of enemies was used; notably Hercules' half-brother, the malicious god of war Ares, replaced Hera as the show's primary antagonist. Towards the end of the series, Ares is himself replaced by the evil god Dahak who is the main villain in the show's fifth season and sets off a story arc that has Hercules traveling to Sumeria, Norseland and Éire. Although Zeus, Hercules' father, is frequently cited by Hercules as a neglectful father, Zeus' love for Hercules is well documented in the show. Indeed, Hercules is often referred to as "the favorite son of Zeus". Zeus makes several appearances on the show, even saving his son's life and restoring his superhuman strength on one occasion when he needs it the most. Hercules, for his own part, is always there for Zeus when his father needs him, and in the end, Hercules reconciles with his father and buries whatever issues he has with the father he has come to understand and love.

== Cast ==
=== Main cast ===
- Hercules (Kevin Sorbo)
- Iolaus (Michael Hurst)

=== Recurring cast ===
- Alcmene (Elizabeth Hawthorne, Liddy Holloway, Kim Michalis)
- Aphrodite (Alexandra Tydings)
- Apollo (Scott Michaelson)
- Ares (Kevin Smith)
- Artemis (Rhonda McHardy)
- Atalanta (Cory Everson)
- Autolycus (Bruce Campbell)
- Callisto (Hudson Leick)
- Cassandra (Claudia Black)
- Charon (Michael Hurst)
- Cupid (Karl Urban)
- Dahak (Michael Hurst, Mark Newnham)
- Deianeira (Tawny Kitaen)
- Deimos (Joel Tobeck)
- Dirce (Lisa Chappell)
- Discord (Meighan Desmond)
- Falafel (Paul Norell)
- Gabrielle (Renee O'Connor)
- Hades (Erik Thomson, Mark Ferguson)
- Hera (Meg Foster)
- Iphicles (Kevin Smith)
- Jason (Jeffrey Thomas, Chris Conrad)
- Joxer (Ted Raimi)
- Kernunnos (Stuart Devenie)
- Morrígan (Tamara Gorski)
- Nebula (Gina Torres)
- Nemesis (Karen Witter, Teresa Hill, Kimberley Joseph)
- Odin (Peter McCauley)
- Persephone (Andrea Croton)
- Salmoneus (Robert Trebor)
- Serena (Sam Jenkins, Kara Zediker)
- Strife (Joel Tobeck)
- Timuron (Craig Hall)
- Xena (Lucy Lawless)
- Xenon (Roger Oakley)
- Zeus (Roy Dotrice, Peter Vere-Jones, Charles Keating, Anthony Quinn).

== Episodes ==
Season	Episodes	Originally released	
Season	Episodes	First released	Last released
TV films	5	April 25, 1994	November 14, 1994
1	13	January 16, 1995	May 8, 1995
2	24	September 4, 1995	June 24, 1996
3	22	September 30, 1996	May 12, 1997
4	22	September 29, 1997	May 11, 1998
5	22	September 28, 1998	May 17, 1999
6	8	September 27, 1999	November 22, 1999

== Spin-offs ==
The show had two spin-offs: Xena: Warrior Princess and Young Hercules, with which it shared recurring characters such as Ares (Kevin Smith), Autolycus (Bruce Campbell), Salmoneus (Robert Trebor), Aphrodite (Alexandra Tydings), Deimos/Strife (Joel Tobeck) and Callisto (Hudson Leick). Both shows, although produced in New Zealand with mostly local actors using American accents, were syndicated worldwide.

== Awards and nominations ==
Year	Nominee / work	Award	Result
2000	Joseph LoDuca	ASCAP Award for Top TV Series	Won

== Home media ==
Anchor Bay Entertainment released all six seasons of Hercules: The Legendary Journeys on DVD in Region 1 for the first time between 2003 and 2005. As of 2010, these releases have now been discontinued.

On January 12, 2010, Universal Studios Home Entertainment announced that they planned on re-releasing Hercules: The Legendary Journeys on DVD. They have subsequently re-released all six seasons.

In Region 4, Madman Entertainment has released all six seasons on DVD in Australia.

Season	Ep #	Release dates	
Season	Ep #	Region 1	Region 4
Season 1	13	June 24, 2003; April 20, 2010 (re-release)	September 9, 2009
Season 2	24	October 21, 2003; March 29, 2011 (re-release)	February 17, 2010
Season 3	22	March 23, 2004; March 13, 2012 (re-release)	June 2, 2010
Season 4	22	July 13, 2004; March 12, 2013 (re-release)	November 3, 2010
Season 5	22	January 11, 2005; July 22, 2014 (re-release)	N/A
Season 6	8	July 12, 2005; September 18, 2018 (re-release)	N/A
Seasons 5 & 6	30	N/A	January 12, 2011

- NOTE: The Season 1 release in both regions 1 & 4 includes the 5 tele-films preceding the series. The region 1 re-release does not include the TV movies.

== In other media ==
=== Books ===
A trilogy of novels was written by Timothy Boggs in 1996 and 1997. A juvenile novel by Hunter Kennedy, Hercules and the Geek of Greece, was published in 1999.

=== Comics ===
A five issue mini-series was published by Topps in 1996, the same year they also published a trading card set.

=== Games ===
The franchise produced a number of games in different formats including a collectable card game and a video game for the Nintendo 64 and Game Boy Color. There was also a role-playing game which was combined with sister series Xena: Warrior Princess.

A board game was also published in 1998 by Fanpro.

=== Animation ===
Hercules and Xena – The Animated Movie: The Battle for Mount Olympus is a 1998 American animated action-adventure direct-to-video film starring the voices of Kevin Sorbo, Lucy Lawless, Michael Hurst, Renee O'Connor, Kevin Smith, and Alexandra Tydings, all reprising their roles from Hercules: The Legendary Journeys and Xena: Warrior Princess. It was directed by Lynne Naylor and written by John Loy. It later received a television airing on Fox's Fox Kids block. The movie's plot involved Hercules and Xena joining forces to save the Gods of Olympus from the Titans.

=== Amusement park attractions ===
Hercules & Xena: Wizards of the Screen was an interactive theme park attraction that was open in Universal Studios from 1997 to 2000.

== Legacy ==
The success of the show led to the commissioning of several similar series, also set in the ancient world, including The Adventures of Sinbad, Conan the Adventurer, The New Adventures of Robin Hood, BeastMaster, Tarzan: The Epic Adventures, Mortal Kombat: Conquest, The Lost World and Jack of All Trades. A sci-fi series, Cleopatra 2525, was also produced as a result of the series' influence. Thirteen years later, Legend of the Seeker was produced by the same team.

== See also ==
- List of Hercules and Xena characters
- Greek mythology in popular culture
- Hercules in popular culture
