= Original Sin (disambiguation) =

Original sin is humanity's original state of sinfulness resulting from the Fall of Man.

Original Sin or The Original Sin may also refer to:

== Film ==
- The Original Sin (film), a 1948 German comedy directed by Helmut Käutner
- Original Sin (1992 film), a Japanese film directed by Takashi Ishii
- Original Sin (2001 film), an American film directed by Michael Cristofer
- Original Sin – The Seven Sins, a 2021 American short film directed by Amy Tinkham

== Literature ==
- The Original Sin (book), a 1972 autobiography by Anthony Quinn
- Original Sin (James novel), a 1994 Adam Dalgliesh novel by P.D. James
- Original Sin (Lane novel), a 1995 Doctor Who novel by Andy Lane
- Original Sin: Illuminating the Riddle, a 1997 theological monograph by Henri Blocher
- "Original Sin" (comics), a 2014 Marvel Comics storyline
- "Original Sin", a short story by Vernor Vinge
- Original Sin, a 2025 book by Jake Tapper and Alex Thompson

== Music ==
- The Original Sins, an American garage-rock band

=== Albums ===
- Original Sin (INXS album), 2010
  - Original Sin – The Collection, a compilation album by INXS, 2004
- Original Sin (John Lewis album), 1961
- Original Sin (Pandora's Box album), 1989
- The Original Sin (album), by Cowboys International, 1979

=== Songs ===
- "Original Sin" (Elton John song), 2002
- "Original Sin" (INXS song), 1983
- "Original Sin" (Taylor Dayne song), 1994
- "Original Sin", by Sofi Tukker, 2022
- "Original Sin", by Theatre of Hate, 1980

== Television ==
- Dexter: Original Sin, 2025 U.S. TV series, a prequel spin-off of Dexter Morgan franchise
- Pretty Little Liars: Original Sin, 2022 season 1 of U.S. TV series Pretty Little Liars

=== Episodes ===
- "Original Sin" (Medici: Masters of Florence), 2016
- "Original Sin" (The Vampire Diaries), 2013

== Other uses ==
- Original sin (economics), a metaphor in economics literature
- Divinity: Original Sin, a 2014 video game

== See also ==
- Fall of man, the Christian narrative encompassing the entire story of original sin
- The Garden of Eden with the Fall of Man, a 1617 painting by Peter Paul Rubens
- The Original Sinn or Nick Cvjetkovich (born 1973), Canadian professional wrestler
- Divinity: Original Sin II, 2017 videogame, part of the Divinity videogame series
- Original (disambiguation)
- Sin (disambiguation)
