= Stradivari (1988 film) =

- Directed by: Giacomo Battiato
- Written by: Suso Cecchi D'Amico; Ernesto Gastaldi; Vittorio Salerno; Giacomo Battiato
- Starring: Anthony Quinn; Stefania Sandrelli; Valérie Kaprisky; Francesco Quinn; Danny Quinn; Lorenzo Quinn
- Cinematography: Tonino Delli Colli
- Music by: Francesco Tampori
- Release date: 1988
- Country: Italy
- Language: Italian

Stradivari is a 1988 Italian biographical drama film directed by Giacomo Battiato. It depicts real life events of luthier Antonio Stradivari. It was filmed in sixteen weeks between Cremona (Stradivari's hometown) and Cinecittà. It stars Anthony Quinn along with his three sons by Italian costume designer, Iolanda Addolori.

== Cast ==
- Anthony Quinn as Antonio Stradivari
- Stefania Sandrelli as Antonia Maria
- Valérie Kaprisky as Francesca
- Francesco Quinn as Alessandro
- Danny Quinn as Francesco
- Lorenzo Quinn as Young Antonio Stradivari
- Leopoldo Trieste as Nicolò Amati
- Pietro Tordi as Friar Mendicant
- Iaia Forte as Comedienne on Boat
