= Francesco Quinn =

American actor (1963–2011)

- Born: Francesco Daniele Quinn; March 22, 1963; Rome, Italy
- Died: August 5, 2011 (aged 48); Malibu, California, U.S.
- Occupations: Actor, voice actor
- Years active: 1985–2011
- Spouse: Julie McCann (divorced)
- Children: 2
- Father: Anthony Quinn
- Relatives: Danny Quinn (brother); Lorenzo Quinn (brother); Alex Higgins (uncle)

Francesco Daniele Quinn (March 22, 1963 – August 5, 2011) was an Italian-American actor and voice actor. He made his film debut as Rhah in Platoon (1986) and appeared on numerous television series, notably as Marcus Vinicius in the miniseries Quo Vadis? (1985), Tomas Del Cerro on The Young and the Restless (1999–2001), Syed Ali on 24 (2003), Guillermo Beltrán on The Shield (2008), and Fabrizio Raimondi on Il commissario Manara (2008). He was the son of Oscar-winning actor Anthony Quinn.

== Early years ==
Francesco Quinn was born in Rome, Italy, the first son of Mexican-American actor Anthony Quinn and his second wife Iolanda Addolori, an Italian costume designer to whom the elder Quinn was married for 31 years. Francesco was raised in both Italy and the United States.

== Career ==
=== Television ===
Quinn made his screen acting debut in Quo Vadis?, a 1985 RAI miniseries based on the novel of the same name.

From 1999 to 2001, Francesco appeared on the CBS soap opera The Young and the Restless as Nina Webster's boyfriend, Tomas del Cerro, and was nominated for an ALMA Award (an award reserved for Latino/a performers) as Outstanding Actor in a Daytime Soap Opera for his work as Tomas Del Cerro, an aloof writer from New York.

Quinn also appeared extensively in television guest-star roles in crime and thriller dramas. He was lead guest star in an episode of JAG (1995). On CBS's The Fugitive, Quinn played Victor Gutierrez, a DEA agent with an edge, and played the recurring role of Islamic terrorist Syed Ali on Fox's series 24. Other TV guest starring roles occurred in Criminal Minds, ER, CSI: Miami, The Glades, Navy NCIS, Alias, Crossing Jordan, In the Heat of the Night, Miami Vice, Red Shoe Diaries, The Handler, Soldier of Fortune, Good vs. Evil, Vengeance Unlimited, and The Adventures of Young Indiana Jones. Quinn also portrayed the final criminal/villain, Guillermo Beltran, in the long-running F/X series, The Shield. In 2008, Quinn joined Luke Perry and C. Thomas Howell in the western TV film A Gunfighter's Pledge.

Quinn was one of the earlier working actors to branch out into contributing to video games with his role as a main character in Command & Conquer: Tiberian Sun (1999). In 2010–2011, he took part in the second season of the Italian TV series Il commissario Manara.

=== Film ===
Quinn made his film debut in Oliver Stone's Academy Award-winning Vietnam War film Platoon (1986), playing Private "Rhah" Ramucci. During the late 1980s, he appeared in a string of Italian films, including the historical biopic Stradivari (also starring his father), the Rambo-esque action film Indio, and the war movie Casablanca Express.

He appeared in many feature films including the New York Independent Film Festival winner Placebo Effect. He acted with his father in several films, including A Star For Two with Lauren Bacall. The two Quinns also had the opportunity to share the role of Santiago in the 1990 mini-series The Old Man and the Sea, son and father playing the character as a young and old man.

Quinn sometimes played moody, dangerous characters, such as vampire Vlad Tepes in the 2003 direct to video alt-historical thriller Vlad, and wandering warrior Thane Le Mal in the short film The Gnostic. Like his father, Quinn also appeared in historical dramas, playing such roles as Latino Captain Salamanca in Steven Spielberg’s mini-series Into the West (2005) and a lead role in TNT's Rough Riders (1997) (TV). One of Quinn's earliest roles was as Marcus Vinicius in the 1985 mini-series Quo Vadis?, co-starring with some major film actors of the 1980s.

Later examples of Quinn's work included Park, which won the audience award at 2007 CineVegas, and the short film Muertas, starring America Ferrera. In 2007, he appeared as Ruben Vega in the Academy Award-nominated short film The Tonto Woman, adapted from the Elmore Leonard short story. In 2011, he would voice Dino / Mirage in Transformers: Dark of the Moon which would be his final role before his death shortly after the film's release.

== Personal life ==
Francesco married Julie McCann and had two children: Massimiliano and Michela Quinn. The marriage ended in divorce in 2008. Before his death he was dating Valentina Castellani.

Quinn has two siblings: Danny and Lorenzo. Quinn has eight other surviving half siblings: Alex, Antonia, Catalina, Christina, Danny, Duncan, Ryan, Sean, and Valentina Quinn. His eldest sibling, Christopher, drowned in 1941, aged two.

Quinn was Roman Catholic, his children Massimiliano and Michela were both baptized by Pope John Paul II.

=== Athletic pursuits ===
Quinn pursued sports such as skiing, snowboarding, windsurfing, free diving, road cycling, mountain biking, and actively raced motocross and street bikes. Quinn also was an avid motorcycler, and was a spokesman for The Motorcycle Industry Council and Honda. He was fluent in English, French, Spanish and Italian.

Quinn was a contestant on Ty Murray’s Celebrity Bull Riding Challenge on CMT, until he was sidelined with a broken rib after being stomped on by a Level 2 bull.

=== Death ===
Quinn died on August 5, 2011, in Malibu, California after experiencing what was believed to be a heart attack while running up a street with his children near his home.

== Filmography ==
=== Feature films ===
Year	Title	Role	Notes
1986	Platoon	PVT. "Rhah" Ramucci	
1988	Priceless Beauty	Peter	
1988	Stradivari	Alessandro	
1989	The Favorite	Mahmud II	
1989	Indio	Daniel Morell	
1989	Casablanca Express	Capt. Franchetti	
1991	A Star for Two	Young Gabriel Todd	
1991	Murder Blues	John Reed	
1992	Judgement	Jimmy Sollera	
1993	Deadly Rivals	Bunny Wedman	
1994	The Visual Bible: Acts	Stephen	
1995	Top Dog	Mark Curtains	
1995	The Dark Dancer	Ramone	
1997	Cannes Man	Frank 'Rhino' Rhinoslavsky	
1998	Nowhere Land	Walfredo	
1998	Deadly Ransom	Luis Mendes	
1998	Placebo Effect	Zac	
2001	Reflections	Him	
2003	Vlad	Vlad Tepes	
2006	Park	Smoldering Park Worker	
2006	Cut Off	Agent Jones	
2007	Afghan Knights	Amad	
2008	Hell Ride	Machete	
2008	Broken Promise	Santos	
2009	Four Single Fathers	Dom	
2010	Rollers	Quinn	
2010	Corruption.Gov	Ron Garcia	
2011	Transformers: Dark of the Moon	Dino / Mirage (voice)	
2012	Roma nuda	Bernard Jovanni	Posthumous release

=== Short films ===
Year	Title	Role	Notes
2000	The Translator	Jean-Paul Esselen	
2006	Man vs. Monday	Juan Carlos	
2007	The Warrior	Warrior	
2007	Muertas	Carlos	
2008	The Tonto Woman	Ruben Vega	

=== Television ===
Year	Title	Role	Notes
1985	Quo Vadis?	Marcus Vinicius	TV miniseries
1987	Miami Vice	Francesco Cruz	Episode: "God's Work"
1990	The Old Man and the Sea	Young Santiago	TV miniseries
1992	Red Shoe Diaries	Tommy	Episode: "Double or Nothing"
1992	The Young Indiana Jones Chronicles	Francois	Episode: "Young Indiana Jones and the Curse of the Jackal"
1992	In the Heat of the Night	Ramon Salazar	Episode: "Sanctuary"
1996	O. Henry's Christmas	Robby Gilliam	TV film
1997	Rough Riders	Sgt. Rafael Castillo	TV miniseries
1997	Soldier of Fortune, Inc.	Ramon Boharo	Episode: "La Mano Negra"
1997	JAG	Mustapha Ben Kessar	Episode: "Code Blue"
1998	Pensacola: Wings of Gold	Javier Nuñez	Episode: "Lost Shipment"
1998	Vengeance Unlimited	Col. Oscar Ponce	Episode: "Security"
1999–2001	The Young and the Restless	Tomas Del Cerro	Main cast
2000	G vs E	Agent Shaw	Episode: "Ambulance Chaser"
2001	The Fugitive	Victor	Episode: "Past Perfect"
2002	Alias	Minos Sakkoulas	Episode: "The Confession"
2002	JAG	Mustapha Ben Kassir, Bedouin Leader, Kabir Atef	Guest; Seasons 2 & 4, recurring role; Season 7
2002	Almost a Woman	Don Carlos	TV film
2003	24	Syed Ali	Recurring role; Season 2
2003	The Handler	Det. Lopez	Episode: "Hardcore"
2004	CSI: Miami	Fidel	Episode: "Murder in a Flash"
2004	NCIS	Gunnery Sgt. Freddy Alvarez	Episode: "One Shot, One Kill"
2004	ER	Dr. Alfonso Ramirez	Episode: "Time of Death"
2005	Into the West	Capitan de Salamanca	Episode: "Wheel to the Stars"
2005	Criminal Minds	Michael Russo	Episode: "Natural Born Killer"
2006	NCIS	Cpl. Luis Romero	Episode: "Once a Hero"
2007	Tinseltown	Arturo	TV film
2008	A Gunfighter's Pledge	Sheriff	TV film
2008	The Shield	Guillermo Beltrán	Recurring role; Season 7
2008	Danny Fricke	Pablo Vicente	TV film
2010–11	The Glades	Eduardo Garcia	Episodes: "Bird in the Hand", "Family Matters"
2011	Zen	Gilberto Nieddu	Episodes: "Vendetta", "Cabal", "Ratking"
2011	Il commissario Manara	Fabrizio Raimondi	8 episodes
2011	Natalee Holloway	Ricardo Flores	TV film

=== Video games ===
Year	Title	Role	Notes
1999	Command & Conquer: Tiberian Sun	General Vega	
2008	Quantum of Solace	Additional characters	Voices
2008	Tom Clancy's EndWar	Additional characters	Voices
2010	Mass Effect 2	Additional characters	Voices
