= Oriundi (film) =

2000 film directed by Ricardo Bravo

- Brazilian theatrical poster
- Directed by: Ricardo Bravo
- Written by: Marcos Bernstein
- Produced by: Rubens Aparecido Gennaro; Virgínia W. Moraes
- Starring: Anthony Quinn
- Cinematography: Toca Seabra; Jacques Cheuiche; Gui Gonçalves
- Edited by: Isabelle Rathery; Ana Teixeira
- Music by: Arrigo Barnabé
- Production company: LAZ Audiovisual
- Distributed by: Warner Bros.
- Release date: 2000
- Running time: 97 minutes
- Country: Brazil
- Languages: Portuguese; Italian
- Budget: $3–5.5 million
- Box office: R$223,608

Oriundi is a 2000 Brazilian drama film directed by Ricardo Bravo. It stars Anthony Quinn as an Italian of an oriundo family in Brazil. Oriundo is an Italian word used to describe foreign-born Italian nationals, especially South Americans of Italian heritage. The film was shot mostly in Curitiba, Paraná and partially at Paraná's coast.

== Cast ==
- Anthony Quinn as Giuseppe Padovani
  - Lorenzo Quinn as young Giuseppe Padovani
- Letícia Spiller as Caterina Padovani / Sofia D'Angelo
- Paulo Betti as Renato Padovani
- Gabriela Duarte as Patty
- Paulo Autran as Dr. Enzo
- Araci Esteves as Paola
- Marly Bueno as Matilde
- Tiago Real as Stephano
- Raquel Rizzo as Chris
