= Quo Vadis? (miniseries) =

1985 Italian TV miniseries

- DVD cover art
- Directed by: Franco Rossi
- Written by: Ennio De Concini
- Based on: Quo Vadis by Henryk Sienkiewicz
- Produced by: Elio Scardamaglia; Francesco Scardamaglia
- Starring: Klaus Maria Brandauer; Max von Sydow; Frederic Forrest; Cristina Raines; Francesco Quinn
- Cinematography: Luigi Kuveiller
- Edited by: Giorgio Serrallonga
- Music by: Piero Piccioni
- Release date: February 24, 1985
- Running time: 6 hours
- Country: various
- Languages: English; Italian

Quo Vadis? is a 1985 international television miniseries made by Radiotelevisione Italiana, Antenne 2, Polyphon Film- und Fernsehgesellschaft, Channel 4 Television, Televisión Española, and Televisione Svizzera Italiana. It was directed by Franco Rossi and produced by Elio Scardamaglia and Francesco Scardamaglia. The script by Ennio De Concini was based on the 1896 novel Quo Vadis by Henryk Sienkiewicz.

The series lasts six hours and was originally shown in six one-hour episodes.

== Cast ==
- Klaus Maria Brandauer as Nero
- Frederic Forrest as Petronius
- Cristina Raines as Poppaea
- Barbara De Rossi as Eunice
- Francesco Quinn as Marcus Vinicius
- Max von Sydow as The Apostle Peter
- Marie-Theres Relin as Licya
- Gabriele Ferzetti as Piso
- Ángela Molina as Acte
- Massimo Girotti as Aulus Plautius
- Françoise Fabian as Pomponia
- Philippe Leroy as Paul of Tarsus
- Leopoldo Trieste as Chilo Chilonides
- Olga Karlatos as Epicaris
- Marko Nikolic as Tigellinus
- Ljubiša Samardžić as Phaemius Rufus
- Georges Wilson as Pedanius
- Marisa Solinas as Polybia
- Annie Belle as Myriam
- Valerija Brkljač as Epafrodito
- Stojan Dečermić as Mark the Evangelist
- Radomir Kovačević as Ursus
