= Vlad (film) =

- Directed by: Michael D. Sellers
- Written by: Michael D Sellers
- Starring: Francesco Quinn; Billy Zane
- Release date: May 16, 2003 (Cannes Film Festival)
- Running time: 98 minutes
- Country: United States
- Language: English

Vlad is a 2003 American horror film directed by Michael D. Sellers and starring Francesco Quinn and Billy Zane. It is based on the life of Vlad Dracula, the Wallachian ruler. The film received generally negative reviews.

== Cast ==
- Francesco Quinn as Vlad Țepeș
- Billy Zane as Adrian
- Brad Dourif as Rădescu
- Paul Popowich as Jeff Meyer/Husband
- Kam Heskin as Alexa Meyer/Wife
- Monica Davidescu as Linsey/Marilena Constantine
- Emil Hoștină as Mircea
- Mircea Stoian as Claudiu
- Guy Siner as Ilie
- John Rhys-Davies as Narrator (voice)
- Adrian Pintea as Iancu de Hunedoara
- Claudiu Bleonț as Vlad II Dracul
- Ioan Andrei Ionescu as Mircea II of Wallachia
