= William Mosedale =

William Radenhurst Mosedale GC (28 March 1894 – 27 March 1971) was awarded the George Cross for the heroism he displayed on 12 December 1940, while working as a fireman during the Birmingham Blitz.

== Early life ==
Mosedale was born in 1894, in Highgate, Birmingham (then in Warwickshire, now in the West Midlands county), England. He attended Sherbourne Road Board School in nearby Balsall Heath from the ages of three to thirteen. He then started work as a tinsmith and carriage lamp maker.

In 1910 Mosedale lied about his age so that he could join the 5th Royal Irish Lancers. He was promoted to the rank of corporal within three years but was forced to leave the army on the death of his mother so that he could look after his siblings.

In 1914 Mosedale took up a job with the City of Birmingham Fire Brigade.

== Citation ==
On the night of the 11 December 1940, during the Birmingham Blitz, Mosedale received a report that a house and auxiliary fire station had been hit by a high explosive bomb. On arriving at the scene he found that both had been completely demolished. Knowing that there may be people trapped inside, he tunnelled for twelve hours to reach them. The tunnel was in constant danger of collapse and the air raid continued during the night hours of the rescue operation. Mosedale eventually rescued twelve trapped people, personally saving their lives with complete disregard for his own safety.

Mosedale was awarded the George Cross for his bravery. His award was announced in the London Gazette on 28 March 1941. The citation read:

The KING has been graciously pleased to award the GEORGE CROSS to:—

William Mosedale, Station Officer and Rescue Officer, Birmingham Fire Brigade.

An Auxiliary Fire Station was completely demolished by a very large high explosive bomb. A number of Auxiliary Firemen were trapped in the station and civilians were buried in an adjoining house which had also been demolished.

Station Officer Mosedale immediately began tunnelling and propping operations. Hundreds of tons of debris covered the site and Mosedale fully realised that at any moment he might be buried by a further collapse.

When the first tunnel was completed and the Control Room reached, he found that there were still men whom he could not extricate. He carried out another tunnelling operation from a different direction and again entered the Control Room. Five men were found, one dead, the others injured.

The Station Officer crawled through and administered oxygen to the injured men and they were then taken out through the tunnel.

The entrance to the cellar of the private house was full of debris. Station Officer Mosedale directed operations for removing this, only to find that the cellar itself had collapsed. He nevertheless persevered and, after a time, reached seven people who were trapped. Three had been killed outright when the roof collapsed. He gave oxygen to the remaining four and succeeded in extricating them.

To reach other victims it was again necessary to tunnel, and Mosedale immediately commenced this work. The dangers to be faced were similar to those which he had found in reaching the Control Room. He nevertheless completed the tunnel and entered the cellar under the Fire Station. Four men who were alive were given oxygen and, despite their injuries, were safely removed.

Tunnelling through such difficult material had necessarily been extremely hazardous, and the cellar collapsed completely, shortly after the removal of the last victim.

These operations, which lasted more than twelve hours, were carried out under a most intense bombardment. Twelve lives were saved by Station Officer Mosedale who showed outstanding gallantry and resource. In effecting the rescues he repeatedly risked his own life.

== Legacy ==
Mosedale died on 27 March 1971.

In 2008 he was commemorated by the naming of a street, Mosedale Way, in his memory. The street is in the Central Park development off Lee Bank Middleway in Ladywood, Birmingham. His nephew Kenneth Mosedale opened the road on 29 July 2008 in the company of other relatives, firefighters, and civic dignitaries.

His medal is now displayed at Birmingham Museum and Art Gallery.
