= George Inwood =

Recipient of the George Cross

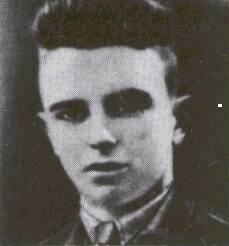
- Born: 22 September 1905; Birmingham, England
- Died: 16 October 1940 (aged 35); Birmingham, England
- Burial place: Yardley Cemetery, Birmingham
- Military career
- Allegiance: United Kingdom
- Branch: Home Guard
- Service years: 1940
- Rank: Sergeant
- Unit: 10th Birmingham (Public Utilities) Battalion
- Conflicts: Second World War: Home Front; The Blitz; Birmingham Blitz †
- Awards: George Cross

George Walter Inwood, GC (22 September 1905 – 16 October 1940) was a British soldier of the Home Guard during the Second World War who was posthumously awarded the George Cross for the "highest form of cool courage and self-sacrifice for others" he displayed on the night of the 15/16 October 1940 during the Birmingham Blitz.

== Early life ==
Inwood was born on 22 September 1905, the son of George Walter Inwood (also known as William Thomas Inwood) and Margaret Caroline (née Jones) and was baptised in St. Martin's, Birmingham, on 11 October 1905. He is buried in plot 46739 of Yardley Cemetery in Birmingham.

== Second World War ==
During the Second World War, in 1940 Inwood joined the Home Guard and was posted to the 10th Birmingham (Public Utilities) Battalion

Following an air raid on Birmingham on the night of 15/16 October 1940, Inwood was asked by the police with assisting in rescue duty in Bishop Street. Taking charge of a party of six volunteers, Inwood found several people were imprisoned in a gas-filled cellar. A small hole was made and Inwood was lowered into the cavity. He brought up two men and then, although nearly exhausted, he entered the cavern a third time and was overcome by the fumes, being dragged out by one of his comrades. Despite medical attention, Inwood was unable to be revived. For his efforts, in displaying "the highest form of cool courage and self-sacrifice for others", Inwood was posthumously awarded the George Cross.

Notice of his Inwood's George Cross appeared in the London Gazette on 27 May 1941, reading:

The King has been graciously pleased to approve the award of the George Cross, for most conspicuous gallantry in carrying out hazardous work in a very brave manner, to Section Commander G. W. Inwood, Home Guard (since deceased).

His widow received his award at an investiture on 10 October 1941. The medal is now displayed at Birmingham Museum and Art Gallery.
