= Placebo Effect (film) =

- Directed by: Alejandro Seri
- Written by: Luciano Saber
- Produced by: Ninoos Bethishou; Cherelle George; Lester Smith
- Starring: Francesco Quinn; Martin Halacy; Luciano Saber
- Music by: Bill Dunn
- Distributed by: LS Films
- Release date: January 31, 1998 (New York)
- Running time: 86 minutes
- Language: English

Placebo Effect is a 1998 American thriller film written by Luciano Saber and directed by Alejandro Seri. Featuring Francesco Quinn, Martin Halacy, and Kirsten Berman, it was released in the United States on 31 January 1998 and won Best Film at the New York Independent Film Festival in 1998.

== Plot ==
Aleksander Ivanov is a cab driver from Bosnia who is drawn into a plot to assassinate the Vice President of the United States. Ivanov tries to find who is behind the plot.

== Cast ==
- Francesco Quinn as Zac
- Luciano Saber as Aleksander Ivanov
- Martin Halacy as Congressman Ryan
- Christopher Richard Garrett as Mick
- Kirsten Berman as Rachel
- Marshall Bean as Mr. Jones
- Sarah Charipar as Jo
- Travis Estes as Ethan
- David Mersault as Jimmy White
- Tyla Abercrumbie as Suit
- Lester Smith as Bartender
- Tracey Stiles as Detective
- Laura Wade as Artist
- Eileen Flahegerty as Model
