= Park (2006 film) =

- Theatrical release poster
- Directed by: Kurt Voelker
- Written by: Kurt Voelker
- Starring: William Baldwin; Ricki Lake; Cheri Oteri
- Release date: June 12, 2006 (CineVegas); February 8, 2007 (limited)
- Running time: 86 minutes
- Language: English

Park is a 2006 American independent comedy film, written and directed by Kurt Voelker in his feature directorial debut. It stars William Baldwin, Anne Dudek, Trent Ford, Dagney Kerr, Ricki Lake, Melanie Lynskey, Izabella Miko, Cheri Oteri, Maulik Pancholy, Francesco Quinn, and Treach. Its plot revolves around a group of colorful characters whose lives intertwine over the course of one day in a Los Angeles public park. It was released theatrically in the United States on February 8, 2007.

== Premise ==
A dozen people and their myriad problems descend upon a quiet Los Angeles park at lunch hour: April comes to commit suicide but can't quite get it right; Peggy and best friend Claire seek to humiliate Dennis, Peggy's philandering husband; while co-workers Babar and Nathan are determined to convince their colleagues, Meredith and Sheryl, that eating lunch in the nude can be a fun and liberating pastime.

== Cast ==
- William Baldwin – Dennis
- Ricki Lake – Peggy
- Cheri Oteri – Claire
- Melanie Lynskey – Sheryl
- Izabella Miko – Krysta
- Anne Dudek – Meredith
- Trent Ford – Nathan
- Maulik Pancholy – Babar
- Dagney Kerr – April
- Anthony 'Treach' Criss – Darnell
- Francesco Quinn – Javier

== Release and reception ==
Park was given the Audience Award at the 8th annual CineVegas Festival, where it premiered in June 2006. It went on to receive a limited theatrical run the following year. The film received a mixed reception from critics and holds a 33% rating on Rotten Tomatoes, based on 12 reviews.

== Awards ==
- Audience Award, CineVegas (2006)
- Best Screenplay Award, Fylmz Festival (2007)
- Bud Abbott Award – Best Feature Comedy, Garden State Film Festival (2007)
- Audience Award, Sonoma Valley Film Festival (2007)
