= Henri Blocher =

French Baptist evangelical theologian

Henri A. G. Blocher (born 3 September 1937 in Leiden, Netherlands) is a French Baptist evangelical theologian.

== Biography ==
Blocher was born on September 3, 1937 to Baptist pastor Jacques Blocher. He is the grandson of Arthur and Madeleine Blocher, as well as the Dutch theologian Hendrik Marius van Nes.

He earned a B.D. degree from Gordon Divinity School in 1959.

=== Ministry ===
In 1961, he became a professor at the Biblical Institute of Nogent-sur-Marne until 2016. In 1965, he became professor of systematic theology at the fr:Faculté libre de théologie évangélique de Vaux-sur-Seine in Vaux-sur-Seine, in France, until 2003, of which he is one of the honorary deans. In 2003, he became professor of systematic theology at Wheaton College in Wheaton (Illinois) until 2008.

Blocher was involved with the Lausanne Committee on World Evangelisation from 1975 to 1980 and is connected to a number of Evangelical groups and colleges around the world.

He is the author of many articles and several books on a variety of theological topics.

Blocher is a proponent of the framework interpretation of the Genesis creation account.

== Recognition ==
He was awarded an honorary doctorate from Westminster Theological Seminary in 2014, where he also gave the commencement address.

In 2018 he received the Personality of the Year award from Christianisme Aujourd'hui.

== Publications ==
- Original Sin: Illuminating the Riddle, InterVarsity Press (January 2001) ISBN 0-8308-2605-X
- Blocher, Henri (November 1984). In the beginning: the opening chapters of Genesis. Leicester, England, Downers Grove, Ill., U.S.A: Inter-Varsity Press, InterVarsity Press. ISBN 978-0-87784-325-2. OCLC 10914826.
- Blocher, Henri (2005-03-25). Evil and the Cross: An Analytical Look at the Problem of Pain. Kregel Publications. ISBN 978-0-8254-2076-4. OCLC 58430995.
- "The Analogy of Faith in the Study of Scripture," in Cameron, Nigel M. De S. (December 1987). The Challenge of Evangelical Theology. Edinburgh: Attic Press. ISBN 978-0-946068-26-5.
- Blocher, Henri (March 2001). La doctrine du péché et de la rédemption. Collection Didaskalia (Nouvelle éd. révisée ed.). Vaux-sur-Seine: Édifac. ISBN 978-2-904407-28-4.
- La Doctrine du Christ, Vaux-sur-Seine, Edifac (March 2002) ISBN 2-904407-33-2
- Blocher, Henri (2006). La Bible au microscope: exég̀ese et théologie biblique. Vaux-sur-Seine: Editions Edifac. ISBN 978-2-904407-40-6. OCLC 191732597.
