= Dagney Kerr =

American actress

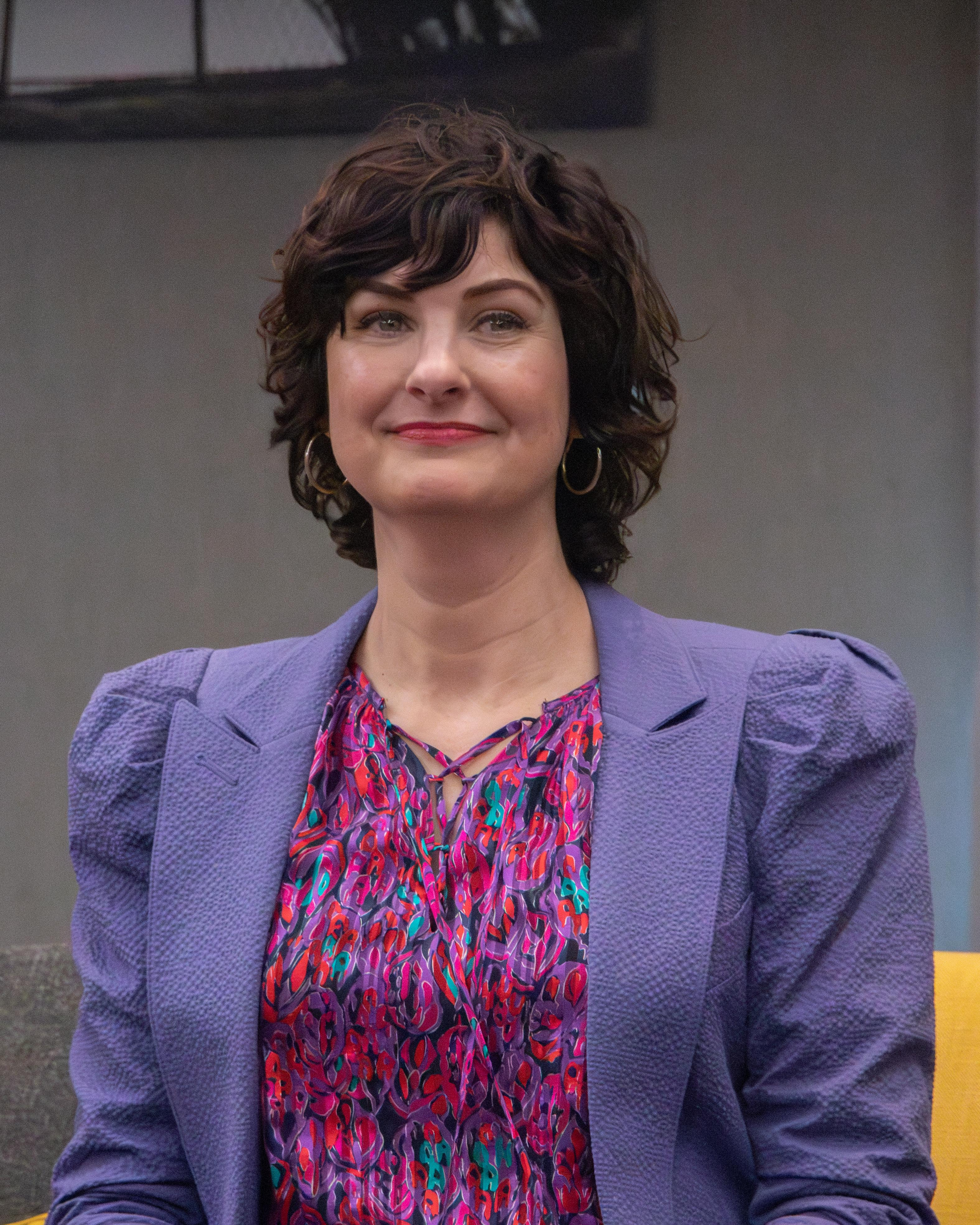
- Dagney Kerr at Whispers from the Hellmouth Convention, April 2024 (Paris).
- Born: Cincinnati, Ohio, U.S.
- Education: School for Creative and Performing Arts
- Occupations: Actress; singer; dancer
- Years active: 1999–present
- Website: http://www.dagneykerr.com

Dagney Kerr is a television actress, singer, and dancer best known for her roles as Nurse Ruth Ann Heisel on Desperate Housewives and Buffy's roommate Kathy on Buffy the Vampire Slayer. She is also known for appearances on George Lopez, E.R., Six Feet Under, and The District.

== Biography ==
Kerr was born in Cincinnati, Ohio. She attended the Cincinnati School for the Creative and Performing Arts and apprenticed in the Cincinnati Ballet Company.

== Filmography ==
=== Movies ===
Film	Role	Notes
Park	April	
One Man's Trash	Dee Dee	
The First $20 Million Is Always the Hardest	Janie Hickenlocker	
Two Weeks Later	Dina	
Push	Nurse Lippens	

=== Television ===
Show	Role	Notes
Ben and Kate	Karen	
Pretty Little Liars	Nancy	
ER	Hedda Lanford	
Desperate Housewives	Nurse Ruth Ann Heisel	
The District	Joyce Lonager	
George Lopez	Claudia	
Buffy The Vampire Slayer	Kathy Newman	2 episodes
The Bernie Mac Show	Teacher Ruth	
Six Feet Under	Patty	
Oh, Grow Up	Janae	
The Parkers	Lilly	
Reba	Potential Customer	
The Hughleys	Receptionist	
Eve	Woman in Theater	
Rude Awakening	Rita	
