= Push (2024 film) =

2024 film directed by David Charbonier and Justin Powell

- Promotional release poster
- Directed by: David Charbonier; Justin Powell
- Written by: David Charbonier; Justin Powell
- Starring: Alicia Sanz; Raúl Castillo
- Cinematography: Daniel Katz
- Production companies: Kinogo Pictures; Mad Descent
- Distributed by: Front Row Filmed Entertainment; Meteor Film; Shudder
- Release date: October 3, 2024
- Running time: 89 minutes
- Country: United States
- Languages: English; Spanish

Push is a 2024 American horror-thriller film written and directed by David Charbonier and Justin Powell. It stars Alicia Sanz and Raúl Castillo.

== Premise ==
Natalie, a pregnant realtor, is tasked with selling a mansion that's been vacant for many years due to a murder that took place there. A potential client attends the open house, but he proves to be a threat to Natalie and her unborn baby.

== Cast ==
- Alicia Sanz as Natalie Flores
- Raúl Castillo as The Client
- David Alexander Flinn as Matt
- Gore Abrams as Guy
- Justin Marcel McManus as Officer Grant
- Linc Hand as Officer Scaringe
- Shaan Sharma as Dr. Patel
- Luke Barnett as Dr. Waller
- Cole Gleason as Officer Stevens
- Dagney Kerr as Nurse Lippens
- Ezra Dewey as Dylan Jacobs
- Ana Mulvoy-Ten as Sarah
- Raquel Vilarino as Laura
- Beckett Smith as The Baby

== Production ==
Directors David Charbonier and Justin Powell had written the script even before their directorial debut The Boy Behind the Door, with the inspiration coming from Charbonier doing his job as a real estate photographer and ending up alone in a secluded house, leading him to call Powell saying "This is really weird. Someone could just come here and kill me. This feels like there’s some of an idea here." When developing it into a script, originally titled Open House, the duo decided to center it around a strong female character.

== Release ==
Push was released in Spain on October 3, 2024 at the Sitges Film Festival. Shudder acquired its distribution rights in March 2025 ahead of its first American screening at the Cinequest Film & Creativity Festival, and the film was released in the United States on July 11, 2025.

== Reception ==
On the review aggregator website Rotten Tomatoes, 65% of 26 critics' reviews are positive.

Meagan Navarro of Bloody Disgusting rated the film 3.5 stars out of 5, praising Daniel Katz's "rich cinematography" and ultimately labeling it "a lean, mean home invasion thriller that plays like a breathless chase in a briskly paced 90-minute runtime." Nick Bythrow of Screen Rant gave a mostly positive review, praising the tension and Sanz's "captivating lead performance", but concluding that it "failed to stick the landing by the end." In a less enthusiastic review, Lena Wilson of IGN called the film "a classic case of style over substance".
