= Birmingham Blitz =

WWII aerial bombardment of British city

- Part of the Strategic bombing campaign of World War II
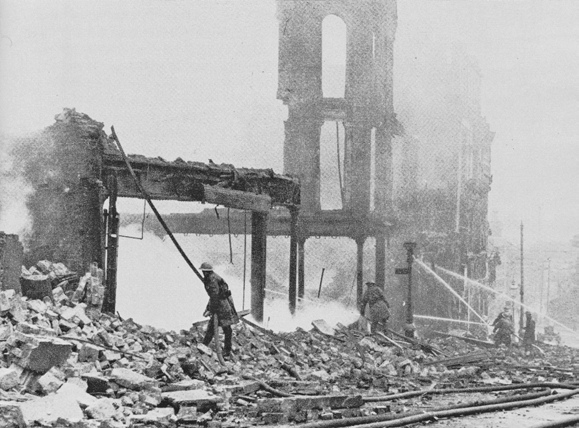
- High Street, looking towards the Bull Ring area after heavy bombing, on 10 April 1941.
Date	9 August 1940 – 23 April 1943
Location	Birmingham, England 52.48°N 1.9025°W
Result	Heavy damage to city by German air raids

Combatants
Germany	United Kingdom

Commanders and leaders
(Nazi Germany) Adolf Hitler (Nazi Germany) Hermann Göring	(United Kingdom) Winston Churchill

Units involved
Luftwaffe (Nazi Germany) Kampfgeschwader 55 (Nazi Germany) Kampfgeschwader 51	Royal Air Force (United Kingdom) Civil Defence Service (United Kingdom) Home Guard

Casualties and losses
Unknown	2,241 civilians killed and 6,692 injured.; 12,391 houses, 302 factories and 239 other buildings were destroyed.
- Location of the city of Birmingham

The Birmingham Blitz was the heavy bombing by the Nazi German Luftwaffe of the city of Birmingham and surrounding towns in central England, beginning on 9 August 1940 as a fraction of the greater Blitz, which was part of the Battle of Britain; and ending on 23 April 1943. Situated in the Midlands, Birmingham, the most populous British city outside London, was considered an important industrial and manufacturing location. Around 1,852 tons of bombs were dropped on Birmingham, making it the third most heavily bombed city in the United Kingdom in the Second World War, behind London and Liverpool.

There was also significant bombing of towns in the neighbouring Black Country, particularly in Dudley, Tipton, Smethwick and West Bromwich, where there were hundreds of casualties.

As with most provincial cities bombed during the Blitz, reports of the bombing were kept low key. Wartime censorship meant that Birmingham was not mentioned by name in contemporary news reports about the bombing, being referred to instead as a "Midland Town". This was done to keep the Germans from knowing the outcome of their raids.

== Damage ==
Overall, there were 365 air raid alerts, and 77 actual air raids on Birmingham, eight of which were classified as major (in which at least 100 tons of bombs were dropped). Official figures state that 5,129 high explosive bombs and 48 parachute mines landed on the city, along with many thousands of incendiary bombs. Of the high explosive bombs, around one fifth failed to detonate and one third of the parachute mines were left suspended after the parachute cords became caught in various obstacles such as trees. In total, 2,241 people were killed, and 3,010 seriously injured. A further 3,682 sustained lesser injuries. 12,391 houses, 302 factories and 239 other buildings were destroyed, with many more damaged.

== Timeline of events ==
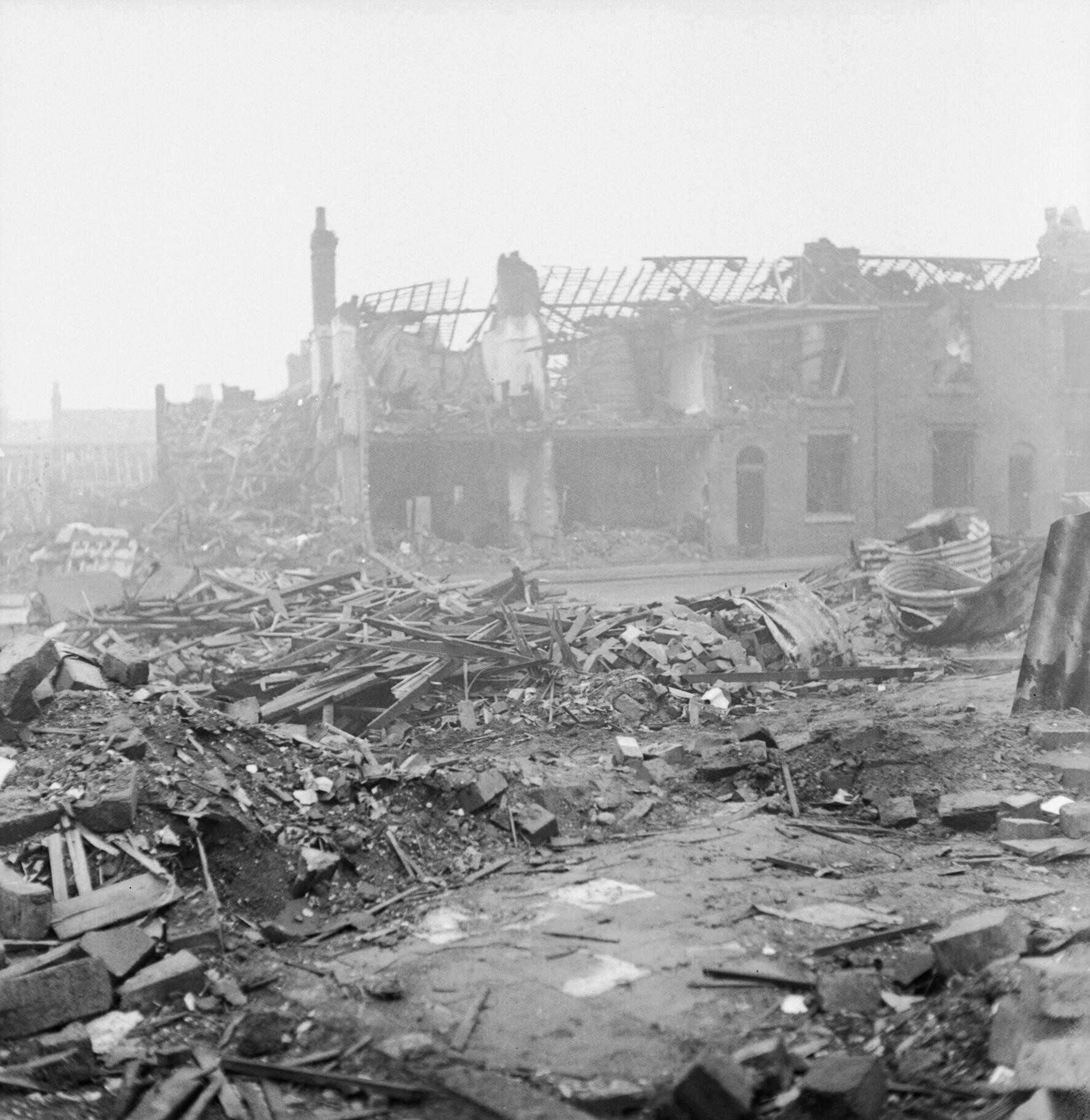
A severely bomb damaged street in Aston Newtown.

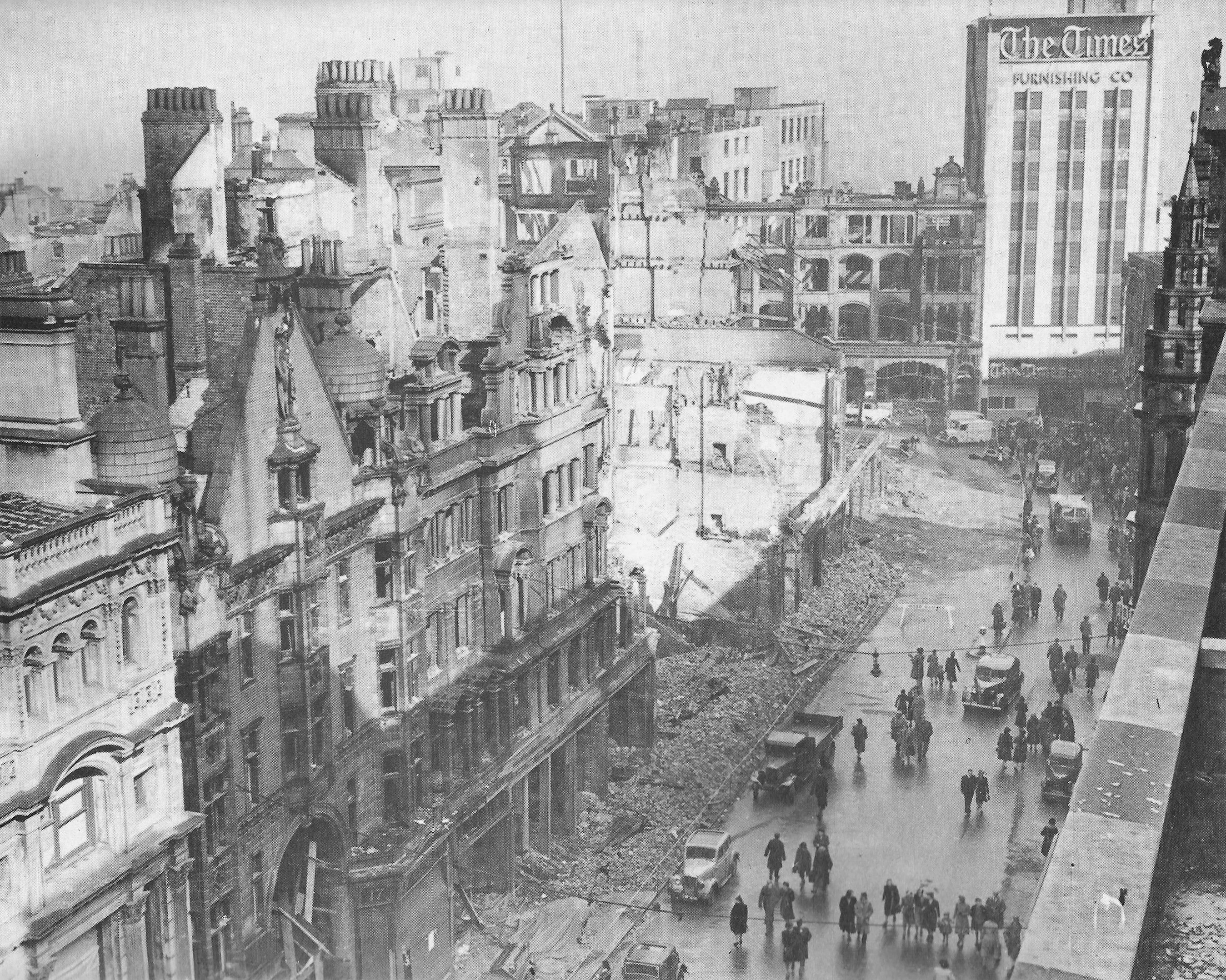
New Street after bombing

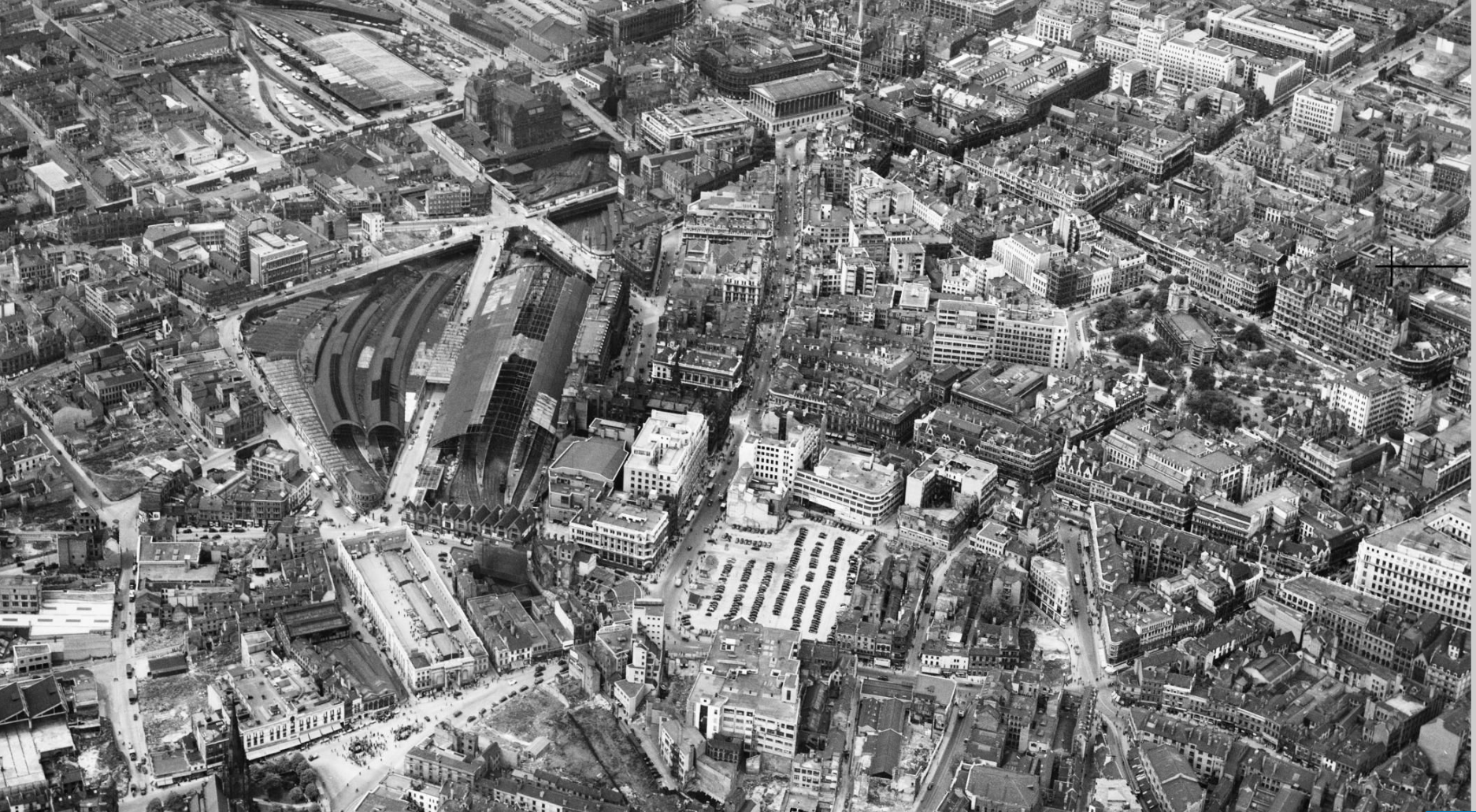
Birmingham in 1946 showing bomb damage

The first air raid on the city took place on 9 August 1940, carried out by a single aircraft which dropped its bombs on Erdington. One person was killed, and six were injured. On August 13, the aircraft factory in Castle Bromwich, which produced Spitfires was attacked. Eleven bombs hit the main target, causing significant damage. 7 people were killed, and 41 injured. The first raid on the city centre occurred on 25/26 August, 25 people were killed in the raid, and the roof and interior of the old Market Hall in the Bull Ring was destroyed after being set ablaze by incendiary bombs. Birmingham Small Arms plant at Small Heath, the sole producer of service rifle barrels and main aircraft machine guns, was first bombed on the same day, resulting in one high explosive bomb and a shower of incendiaries hitting the main barrel mill.

Regular small raids followed over August, September, October and early November. The city centre was badly hit between 25 and 30 October. Among the buildings hit were Birmingham University, the Art Gallery and the Town Hall. The roof of the Council House was damaged by fire, and on the 29th, St Philip's Cathedral suffered serious fire damage after being hit by an incendiary.

In November 1940, a series of heavy air raids on Birmingham took place. Between the 19th and 28th of that month, around 800 people were killed and 2,345 were injured, with 20,000 civilians made homeless.

On the first evening of the bombing, just five days after the devastating attack on nearby Coventry, the first major air raid was launched against Birmingham, when around 440 bombers attacked the city, killing 450 people and badly injuring 540. Around 400 tonnes of high explosives were dropped during the raid, including 18 parachute mines. The raid turned out to be the most severe attack on Birmingham in the course of the war. A number of factories were badly damaged in the raid, including the Lucas Industries and GEC works. The Birmingham Small Arms Company (BSA) factory was badly damaged, causing loss of production and trapping hundreds of workers. 53 employees were killed, 89 were injured, 30 of them seriously, and rifle production was halted for three months. The resulting delays in productions reportedly caused most worries to Prime Minister Winston Churchill among all the industrial damage during the Blitz, so the Ministry of Supply and BSA immediately began a process of production dispersal throughout Britain, through the shadow factory scheme. A member of the Home Guard and one of the company's electricians were later awarded the George Medal for their bravery in helping the trapped workers.

The following night, 200 bombers returned for another heavy raid, dropping 118 tonnes of explosives and 9,500 incendiaries, causing widespread damage. The main bus depot in Hockley was among the buildings hit, destroying or damaging 100 vehicles.

A third consecutive major raid followed on 21/22 November. During this eleven-hour raid, large numbers of incendiaries were dropped, starting over 600 fires. The water supply system was badly damaged by bombs, causing three-fifths of the city to lose mains water supply; firefighters, therefore, had to draw water from the city's canals. Supporting fire brigades from across the country were drafted in to help, and the fires were eventually brought under control. Nevertheless, Birmingham's water supply remained in a critical state, only one-fifth of the normal quantity would have been available if there had been another raid, leading the Regional Commissioner to comment "Birmingham will burn down if the Luftwaffe comes again tonight." However, there was no other raid that night, and this gave engineers time to repair the water mains.

Around 60 bombers attacked Birmingham on 4 December. The Witton tram depot was badly damaged in this raid. One week later, on the night of 11 December another major raid involving 278 bombers was launched against the city. This was the longest raid of the Blitz lasting for 13 hours. Apart from explosives, around 25,000 incendiaries were dropped during the raid, causing widespread fires in both residential and industrial areas. 263 people were killed and 243 badly injured. All but the fine tower and classical west portico of St Thomas' Church on Bath Row was destroyed in the raid. Its ruins now form part of St. Thomas' Peace Garden, a public park designated as a monument to peace and a memorial to all those killed in armed conflict.

Further heavy raids followed in 1941, on 11 March 135 bombers attacked the city. On 9 and 10 April, Birmingham was subjected to two heavy raids. In the first of these, 235 bombers dropped 280 tonnes of explosives and 40,000 incendiaries, concentrated on the city-centre. The Bull Ring, New Street, High Street, and Dale End all suffered heavy damage, St Martin in the Bull Ring was damaged and the Prince of Wales Theatre and Midland Arcade were destroyed. Other areas including Small Heath, Aston and Nechells, also suffered heavy damage. On the second night, 245 bombers dropped 245 tonnes of explosives and 43,000 incendiaries, causing major damage in Solihull, Hall Green and Erdington. The two April raids caused 1,121 casualties.

On the night of 16 May, another large raid caused damage to the Wolseley Motors factory and the ICI factory, although a navigation error meant that most of the bombers dropped their bombs on nearby Nuneaton by mistake.

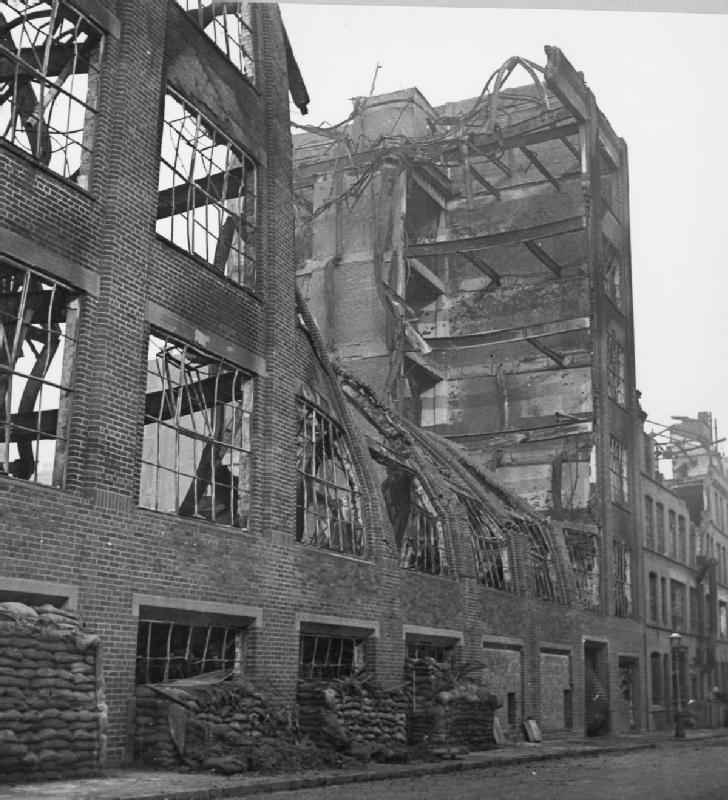
A ruined factory building.

The last significant raid on Birmingham came on 27 July 1942, when around 60 to 70 bombers attacked the city. The very last raid on the city came on 23 April 1943 when just two bombs fell on Bordesley Green, causing slight injury, and the last air raid siren sounded on 15 May 1944.

== Black Country ==
The Black Country area was also the target of air raids from the Luftwaffe, although these caused less damage and fewer casualties than in Birmingham. These included:

- A string of air raids on Wolverhampton in 1941 and 1942. Despite Wolverhampton's status as a large town with heavy industry, it suffered relatively little air raid damage, with eight fatalities in air raids between 1940 and 1944.
- An air raid on Darlaston on 5 June 1941, when a bomb aimed at the town's Rubery Owen factory struck a nearby housing estate and killed 11 people. Another air raid on the town on 31 July 1942 destroyed All Saints Church.
- West Bromwich suffered its heaviest raid on 19 November 1940, when Birmingham also suffered a heavy raid, with more than 50 fatalities, mainly around the town centre. Several houses were wrecked by bombs in the Tantany and Stone Cross areas of the town, but there were no deaths.
- Dudley was bombed on the same night as West Bromwich, with the 10 fatalities all occurring in the Oakham area of the town, when a landmine hit a section of council houses. Another bomb in the town centre demolished a public house and caused damage to buildings including a church and a department store, but nobody was injured. Another bombing nine months later resulted in five deaths. The following year, five other people were killed when a landmine was dropped on a new housing estate near the border with Tipton, demolishing two houses and damaging several others.
- There were also a number of fatalities in nearby Tipton in the blitz that night, with several more deaths occurring in the Great Bridge area of the town in May 1941 when a bomb demolished a public house and several surrounding houses.
- Smethwick was bombed on several occasions between 1940 and 1942, resulting in a total of 80 deaths.
- Oldbury was bombed on several occasions, being one of the towns struck during the region's air raid of 19 November 1940, killing three people. The only other fatal air raid in the town took place five months later, resulting in one death when a house near the border with Rowley Regis was hit by a bomb.
- A total of 36 people in Solihull were killed in air raids between 1940 and 1942.
- 17 people died as a result of air raids on Willenhall on 21 November 1940 and 31 July 1942.
- There was one civilian fatality in Brierley Hill. On 11 January 1941, struck the town's railway goods station, seriously injuring a worker who died more than a year later, having never recovered from his injuries.
- There were two fatal air raids in Coseley. The first on 26 June 1940 resulted in one death, and the second air raid on 20 August 1940 resulted in four deaths. Both of these air raids took place near to the border with Bilston.
- The only fatal air raid on Bilston occurred on 30 August 1940, when a steel worker was seriously injured in an air raid and died shortly after reaching hospital.
- Wednesbury suffered its only civilian casualty on 31 July 1942 when housing near the border with Darlaston was bombed.
- Sutton Coldfield (not in the Black Country) was bombed four times between August 1940 and August 1942, with one fatality each time.
- There were no fatal air raids on Sedgley or Stourbridge.

== Important industrial targets ==
Name	Location	Production
Aerodrome Factory	Castle Bromwich	1,200+ Spitfires & Lancasters
Austin "Shadow Factory"	Longbridge	2,866 Fairey Battles, Hurricanes, Stirlings & Lancasters
Austin Works	Longbridge	500 Military Vehicles/week
Rover	Solihull	Bristol Hercules Engines
Fisher and Ludlow	Birmingham	Lancaster Wings, Shell Casings, Bombs
Reynold	Birmingham	Spitfire Wing Spars, Light Alloy Tubing
GEC	Birmingham	Plastic Components
SU Carburettors	Birmingham	Aero-carburettors
Birmingham Small Arms Factory	Birmingham	Rifles, sten guns (100% of all made)

Other targets included: Dunlop, Chance Brothers, Lucas, Metro-Cammell, Morris Commercial, British Timken, Hudson's Whistles and the Monitor Radio Company.

== Decorations ==
Several service people were decorated for their heroism during the blitz. They include:

- Charity Bick, GM
- George Inwood, GC
- William Mosedale, GC

== Memorial ==
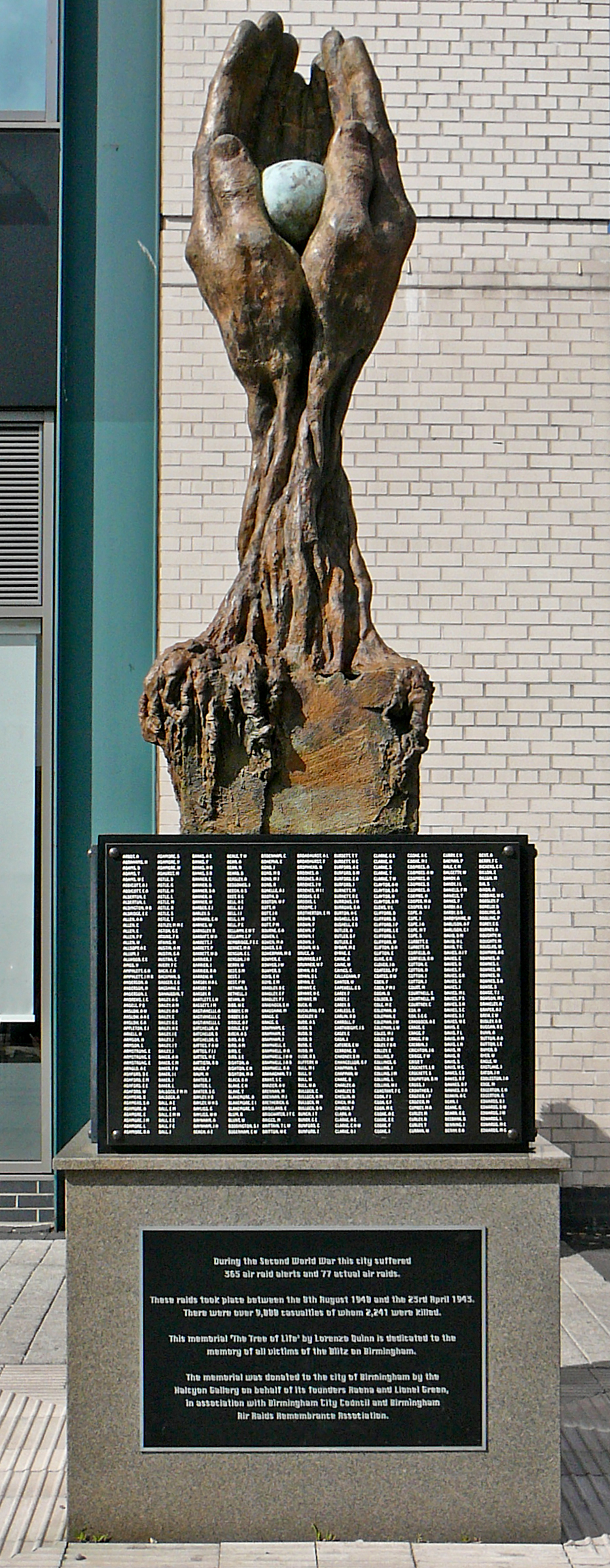
The Tree of Life memorial dedicated to the victims of the Blitz in Birmingham. Sculpted by Lorenzo Quinn, it was unveiled in the Bull Ring by Councillor John Hood on 8 October 2005.

On October 8, 2005, a memorial sculpture, named 'The Tree of Life' sculpted by Lorenzo Quinn, dedicated to the victims of the Blitz was unveiled adjacent to St Martin's Church. It was located on Edgbaston Street from October 2005 to July 2026, before being removed for restoration, coming back on the 8th October 2026, before rededication on 10th October 2026 in St Martin's Square.

== Aftermath ==
The massive bomb damage on civilian housing in Birmingham contributed to the development of many large council estates across the city for some 20 years after the Second World War, including neighbourhoods such as Castle Vale and Chelmsley Wood. Another major factor in the construction of these new estates was to replace the 19th century slums in the inner city areas.

Some of the bomb-damaged inner city areas such as Ladywood and Highgate were redeveloped with modern housing after the war, although these were mostly less densely populated than before.

== See also ==
- The Blitz
- History of Birmingham

== Bibliography ==
- Ray, John (1996). The Night Blitz. Cassel & Co. ISBN 0-304-35676-X.
- Gardiner, Juliet (2010). The Blitz. Harper Press. ISBN 978-0-00-738661-1.
- Douglas, Alton (1982). Birmingham At War, A Pictorial Account. Birmingham Post & Mail.
- The Story of Erdington - From Sleepy Hamlet to Thriving Suburb, Douglas V. Jones, 1989, Westwood Press (ISBN 0-948025-05-0)
