= Casablanca Express =

- Italian theatrical release poster
- Directed by: Sergio Martino
- Written by: Roberto Leoni; Ernesto Gastaldi
- Produced by: Pietro Innocenzi; Umberto Innocenzi
- Starring: Jason Connery; Glenn Ford; Donald Pleasence; Francesco Quinn
- Cinematography: Giancarlo Ferrando
- Music by: Luigi Ceccarelli
- Release date: 22 December 1989
- Running time: 84 minutes
- Country: Italy
- Language: English

Casablanca Express is a 1989 Italian action war film starring Jason Connery and Francisco Quinn that was filmed in Morocco. It was produced by Pietro Innocenzi and Umberto Innocenzi and directed by Sergio Martino. The film was later featured in an episode of Cinema Insomnia.

== Plot ==
In 1942 Winston Churchill arrives in Algiers. He plans to travel on to Casablanca where he will meet Franklin D. Roosevelt and Joseph Stalin for the Casablanca Conference. His aides and army commanders strongly advise against travelling by train, but Churchill is adamant.

Intelligence discovers that Churchill's presence is known to the Germans, and they fear a killing or kidnapping may be attempted. An especially secure carriage is attached to a train (The Casablanca Express) and a unit of American commando troops assigned to travel with him. Three intelligence agents, Alan Cooper, Captain Franchetti and Lt. Lorna Fisher are assigned as bodyguards, but Cooper is held back after he chases and kills a French double agent.

The train proceeds on its way, but a German agent, Otto von Tiblis, is amongst the passengers in disguise. He is detected by Franchetti and a fight on the coach roof ensues. Now revealed, von Tiblis opens fire on the passengers and takes over the engine at gunpoint. The train comes to a halt, and a unit of German paratroopers, awaiting this moment, attack the train. They kill nearly all the American soldiers and wound and kill many passengers.

Back in Algiers, Allied intelligence learn of the attempted kidnap and Cooper volunteers for a dangerous mission. He travels alone by camel and sneaks up on the train. The coaches have all been wired with explosives in case of attack, but he gets a badly wounded Franchetti to crawl under the coaches and cut the wires connecting the explosives and the detonator. Cooper, Fisher and Franchetti open fire on the Germans; Fisher is able to send an emergency radio signal to Algiers, at which point a trainload of heavily armed US Marines leaves to intercept the Express.

All the Germans have been killed, but von Tiblis manages to get the train going. He soon comes face to face with the Marines, who shoot up the train and kill him.

Franchetti dies, but Cooper and Fisher, badly wounded, return to Algiers. They learn that the 'Churchill' they battled to protect was actually a decoy, and the real Churchill has travelled to Casablanca by plane.

== Cast ==
- Jason Connery as Alan Cooper
- Francesco Quinn as Captain Franchetti
- Jinny Steffan as Lieutenant Lorna Fisher
- Manfred Lehmann as Otto Von Tiblis
- Jean Sorel as Major Valmore
- Donald Pleasence as Colonel Bats
- Glenn Ford as Maj. Gen. Williams
- Luisa Maneri as Nanny
- Horst Schön as Priest (as Horst Schon)
- David Brandon as Jason Lloyd
- John Evans as Winston Churchill
- Marina Viro as Olga
- Giulia Urso as Liz
- Giovanni Tamberi as Julian
- Augusto Poderosi as Barry

== See also ==
- The Eagle Has Landed, a British film featuring a similar fictitious German attempt to kidnap Churchill.
