= Original Sin: Illuminating the Riddle =

1995 book by Henri Blocher

- Author: Henri Blocher
- Language: English
- Genre: Theology
- Publisher: Eerdmans
- Publication date: 1997
- Publication place: England
- Media type: Paperback
- Pages: 158 pp (Paperback edition)
- ISBN: 0-8308-2605-X (Paperback edition)
- OCLC: 439259637
- Dewey Decimal: 233/.14 21
- LC Class: BT720 .B565 2000

Original Sin: Illuminating the Riddle is a short theological monograph based on Lectures given by Henri Blocher in 1995 at Moore Theological College in Sydney, Australia. It articulates the major contours of the Christian doctrine of original sin. D. A. Carson, a theologian from Trinity Evangelical Divinity School, writes that Blocher "is able to think through the interlocking contributions of historical theology, biblical theology and systematic theology, and come to fresh conclusions in the light of Scripture, without overturning all that is valuable from the past."

== Synopsis ==
Blocher begins by outlining the doctrine of Original Sin in its four parts. Universal sinfulness, the shared culpability of all humanity. Natural sinfulness, the innate or natural tendency to sin in people. Inherited sinfulness, the transmission of the Adam's original sin. Adamic sinfulness the idea that sin had its origin in the Garden of Eden with an act of rebellion by Adam, also known as "The Fall".

Blocher then analyses the status of "The Fall" in the context of Genesis, modern science and a wider theological context. Blocher favours the 'framework' interpretation of the early chapters of Genesis, which means he understands "The Fall" as a complex type of 'myth' containing historical elements such as Adam, Eve, the Garden itself and an actual act of original rebellion.

The core of the book is centred on Blocher's discussion of Romans 5. In this chapter Blocher compares two common theological views of understanding "The Fall" with some of his own ideas about the topic.

Blocher concludes the book with two chapters about the significance of "The Fall" for humanity and the solution provided by the atonement of Jesus Christ.

== See also ==
- Hamartiology
