= Lorenzo Quinn =

Italian sculptor

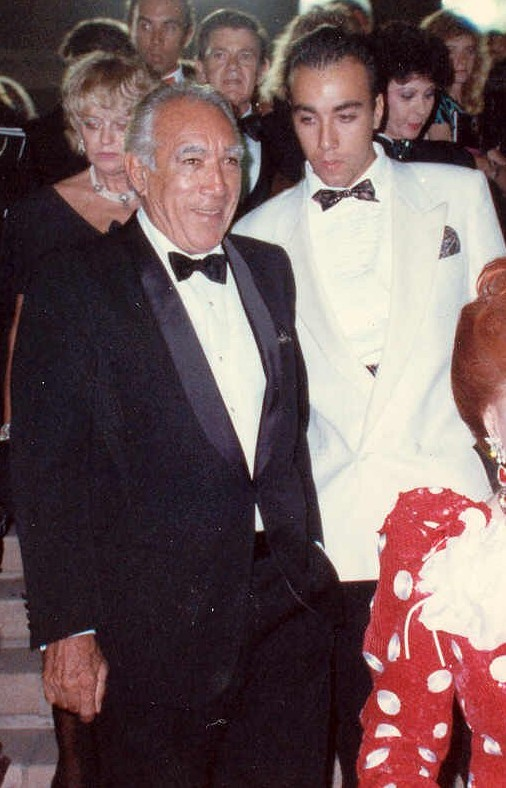
- Quinn with his father, the actor Anthony Quinn at the 40th Annual Emmy Awards, August 28, 1988.
- Born: 7 May 1966 (age 60); Rome, Italy
- Occupations: Sculptor (1982–present); Actor (1988–1999)
- Spouse: Viktoriya Trofymenko (married 2026-present)
- Children: Christopher Quinn, Nicholas Quinn, Anthony Quinn
- Father: Anthony Quinn

Lorenzo Quinn (born 7 May 1966) is a contemporary Italian sculptor and former actor. He is the eighth child (fifth son) of actor Anthony Quinn.

== Biography ==
Lorenzo Quinn was born on 7 May 1966 in Rome, Italy, the son of Mexican-American actor Anthony Quinn and his wife Iolanda (nee Addolori). Quinn was raised in the United States and Italy and presently lives in Barcelona in Spain. He began practising art as a painter in the early 1980s when he enrolled at the American Academy of Fine Arts in New York City. In 1988 he moved to Spain. After divorcing Giovanna Cicutto in 2024, he married Viktoriya Trofymenko on June 21, 2026, in Siena.

== Acting ==
Quinn acted professionally in the late 1980s, portraying the young Italian violin maker Antonio Stradivari in the 1988 Italian film Stradivari, directed by Giacomo Battiato. Quinn's father Anthony starred in the same production as the adult Stradivari. Quinn subsequently played the Spanish surrealist artist Salvador Dalí in Dalí, alongside English actress Sarah Douglas portraying his wife Gala. Quinn won the best new actor award at the Biarritz Film Festival for his work on Dalí.

== First exhibitions ==
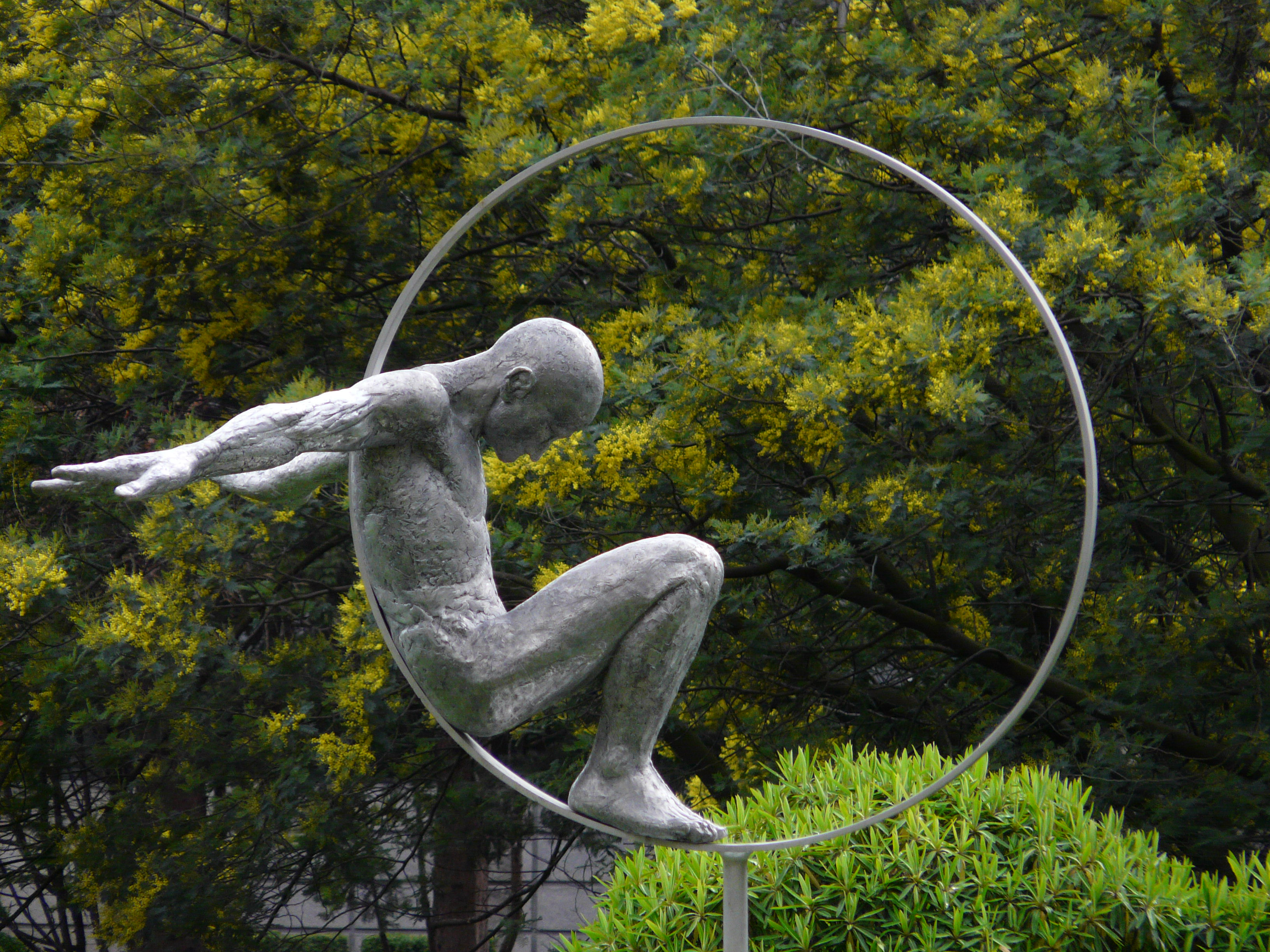
Volare at Cadogan Place, London, England

In the early 2000s, Quinn made the decision to abandon his acting career to instead devote himself entirely to art.

Quinn’s public art includes Encounters, commissioned by Fundatur and donated to Mallorca in 2003. It is now situated in Palma de Mallorca. Further works are on display at King Edward’s Wharf – Creation, Volare and Crossing a Millennium – with their characteristic focus on the hand, the human form, and the circle.

The exhibition Equilibrium took place in November 2009, coinciding with the installation of Give and Take III in Berkeley Square for six months. Included in the show were several new sculptures, including What Came First? (male and female forms lying in egg-shaped hemispheres) and Home Sweet Home (a marble woman cocooned in barbed wire).

Quinn's Forces of Nature series of sculptures have been displayed in England, Italy, the United States, Singapore, Netherlands, Qatar and Monaco.

In October 2018 the sculpture Stop Playing was donated to the city of Venice and installed in Forte Marghera.

== Commissions ==
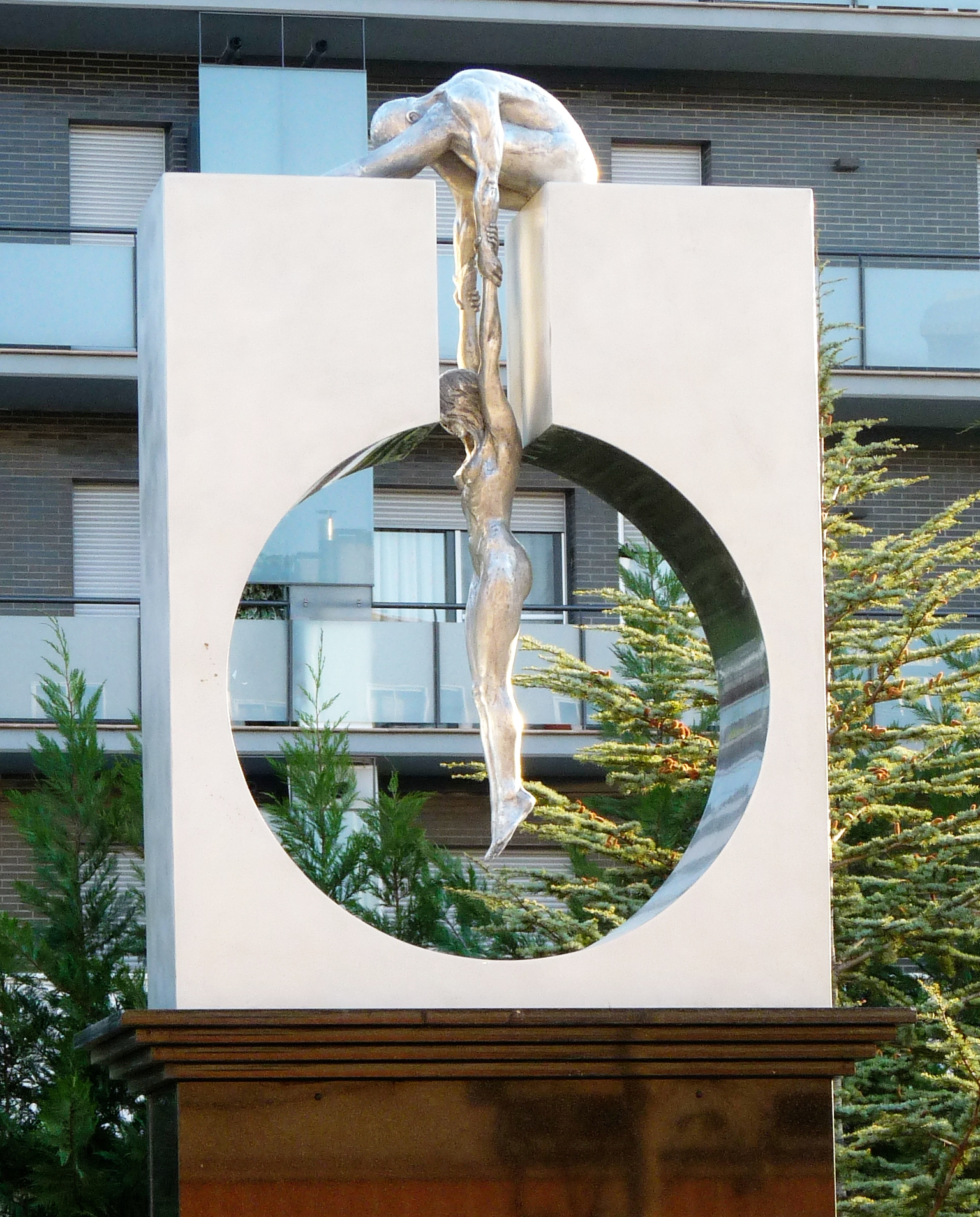
Gravity in Fraga, Spain.

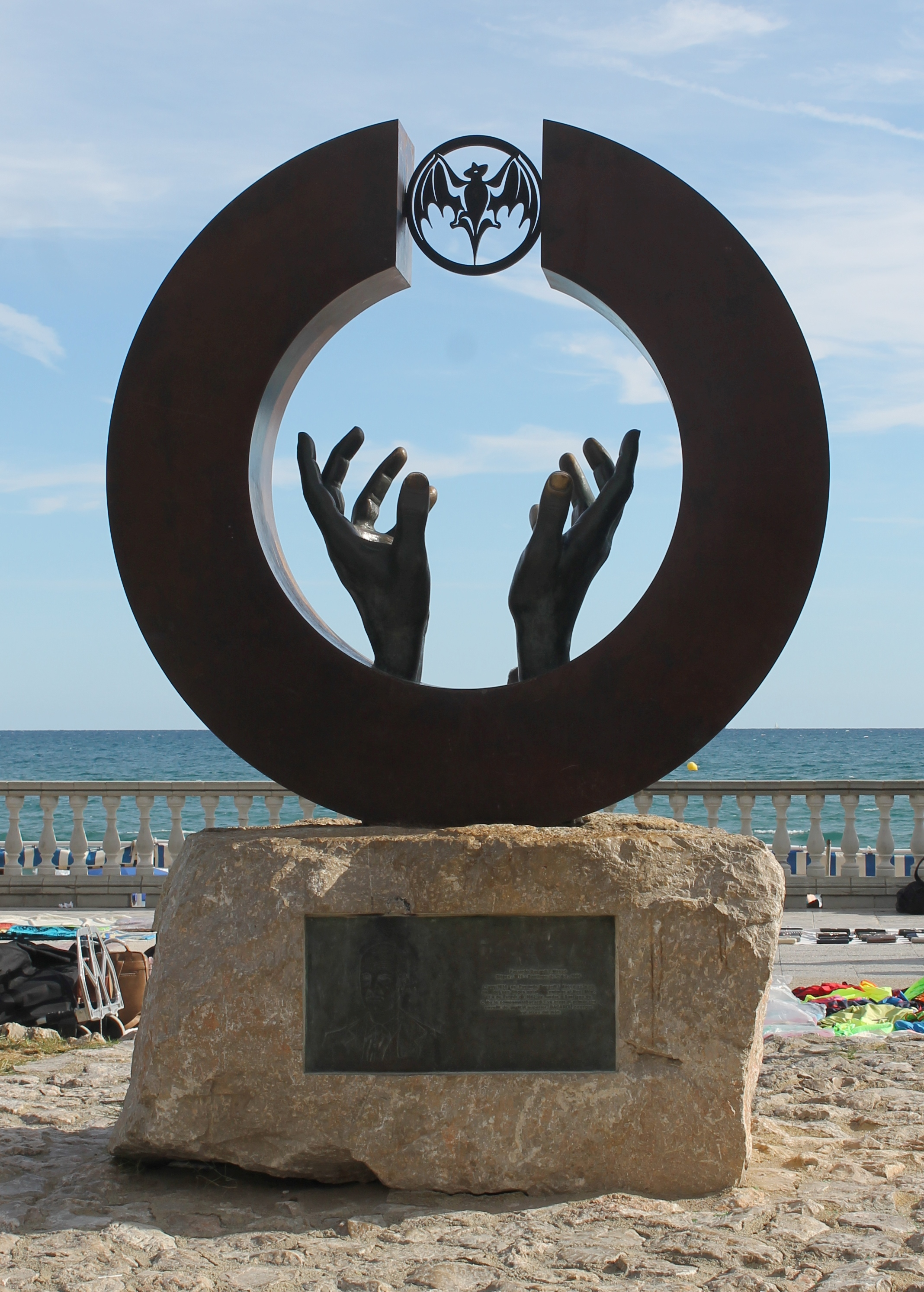
Memorial of Facundo Bacardí i Masso, 2009 Sitges, Spain

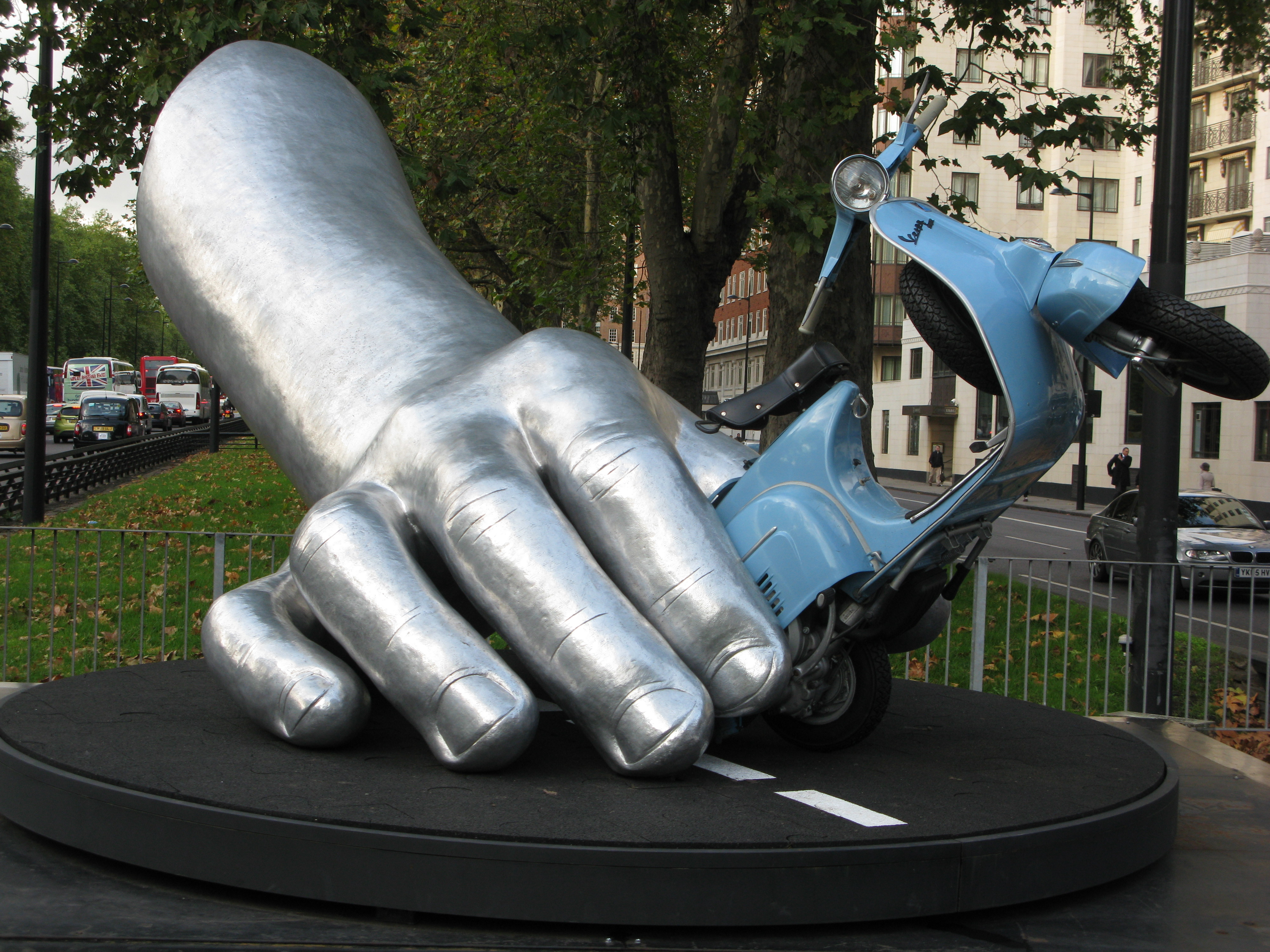
La dolce vita 2011 at Park Lane / Curzon Gate, London, UK

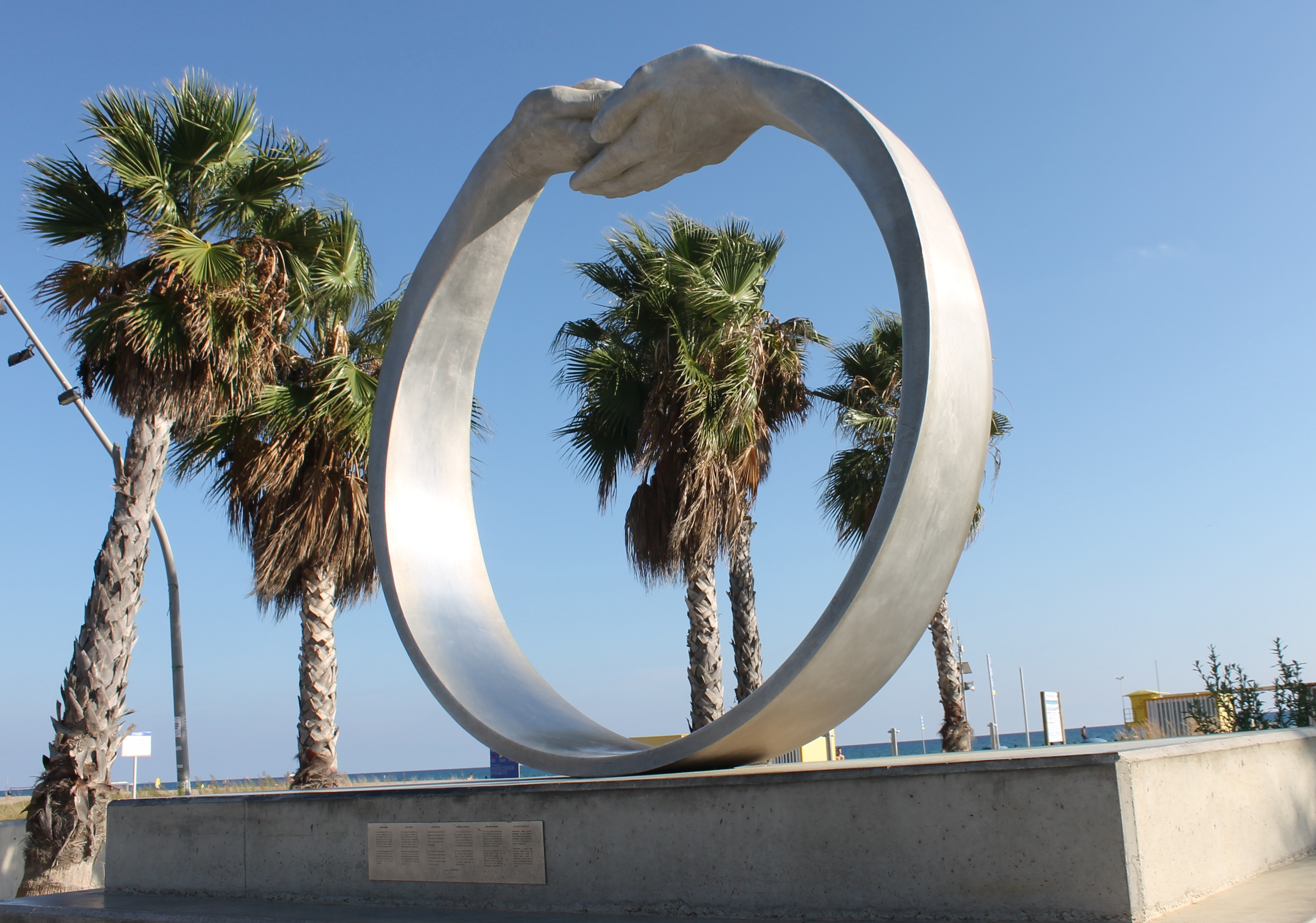
Dar y Tomar (Give and Take) 2013 on the Passeig Maritim, Castelldefels, Spain

Among other commissions, for the people of Birmingham, in October 2005, Quinn created the sculpture Tree of Life representing those that had perished in the Birmingham air raids in World War II.

Quinn has worked on commissions for the Sports Academy ASPIRE in the Gulf states and many in Spain where he currently lives with his wife and children. He also has a permanent exhibition at the Rafart Gallery in Almenar, Spain.

Quinn designed the Ride The World trophy for the MOTO GP championships. The trophy was presented to Valentino Rossi in 2004.

In December 2020 the sculpture You are the World was installed at AFAS Software – Leusden, in the Netherlands; previously, in the same year, the sculpture Give toured the cities of Italy remaining on display first in Florence, then in Palermo and the following year in Pietrasanta.

2021 was the year of Together, the monumental wire mesh sculpture on display for the annual Exhibition of Art d'Égypte, titled "Forever is Now", held in front of the Pyramids of Giza.

== Charity ==
Quinn supports many charities. Proceeds from the sale of his sculpture Friendship Fish went to environmental causes. He was a Young Artists Patron for Unesco. He donated the sculpture Hope to the Blind Museum (Museo Tiflológico) in Madrid, Spain. He also designed the Children In Need award which was awarded to Heather Mills and Phil Collins in 2005.

== Sculpture in Venice ==
In May 2017 the sculpture Support was inaugurated in Grand Canal as a reminder of rising sea levels and climate change problems.

In 2019 the sculpture Building Bridges was inaugurated in the basin of the Arsenale in Venice. The sculpture is formed by six pairs of hands representing humanity's universal values - Friendship, Faith, Help, Love, Hope and Wisdom.

In July 2022 Quinn returned to Venice with a new sculpture: Baby 3.0, a mesh sculpture of a baby overlooking the Grand Canal in the garden of the Metropolitan City of Venice.

From the 20th April to the 15th of September 2024 Lorenzo Quinn exhibits at Ca' Rezzonico Museum an exhibition called "Souls of Venice" depicting some of the most important historical figures of Venice like Marco Polo. The exhibition consists of 15 statues made of mesh, a metallic weave.

== FIFA World Cup 2022 & Hyundai commission ==
On the occasion of FIFA World Cup 2022, Hyundai commissioned the sculpture The Greatest Goal.

Hyundai Motor opened the FIFA Museum with the FIFA World Cup Exhibition and officially revealed Lorenzo Quinn's monumental sculpture The Greatest Goal. The sculpture resembles a giant frame embodied by two hands holding onto each other, symbolizing the mission of the "Goal of the Century" initiative: creating a united world for sustainability.

At the same time another sculpture was inaugurated in the ASPIRE zone: Qatar Forward.

== Galeria Gastronomica ==
Quinn co-owns the Italian restaurant Galeria Gastronomica in Barcelona, which is also the setting for many of his sculptures. Most of the restaurant's hardware items, such as the cutlery, were designed by him.

== Filmography ==
Year	Title	Role	Notes
1988	Onassis: The Richest Man in the World	Alexander Onassis	TV movie.
1989	Stradivari	Antonio Stradivari (young)	
1991	Dalí	Salvador Dalí	
1994	Alles Glück dieser Erde	Renato Tucci	TV series.
1998	Bomba de relojería	Luca Squarcina	
1999	Tierra de cañones	Eduard de Sicart	
1999	Oriundi	Young Giuseppe Padovani	
1999	Camino de Santiago	Sebastián	TV mini-series.
