= The Original Sin (book) =

1972 autobiography by Anthony Quinn

- Author: Anthony Quinn
- Language: English
- Genre: Autobiography
- Publisher: Little, Brown & Company
- Publication date: October 1972
- ISBN: 0-316-72898-5

The Original Sin is Anthony Quinn's first autobiography. The full title is The Original Sin: A Self-Portrait by Anthony Quinn, and it was first published in October 1972 by Little, Brown & Company, Boston & Toronto with ISBN 0-316-72898-5.

His story is that of a man who has difficulty accepting unconditional love (this is the original sin) and the death of his son at an early age.

He explores his past and reveals his darkest feelings with his psychiatrist and the reasons why he was finally able to accept love and the death of his son Christopher at the age of two.

Quinn describes his upbringing, the poverty and his affections for his mother and father which helped define the character he became. His anecdotes of working in Hollywood are also entertaining and reveal a human side of Hollywood. He reveals how he met some of his famous friends which include Mae West, Katharine Hepburn, Rita Hayworth, Carole Lombard, Frank Lloyd Wright, John Barrymore, Gary Cooper, Cecil B. de Mille.
