= Anthony Quinn =

Mexican-American actor (1915–2001)

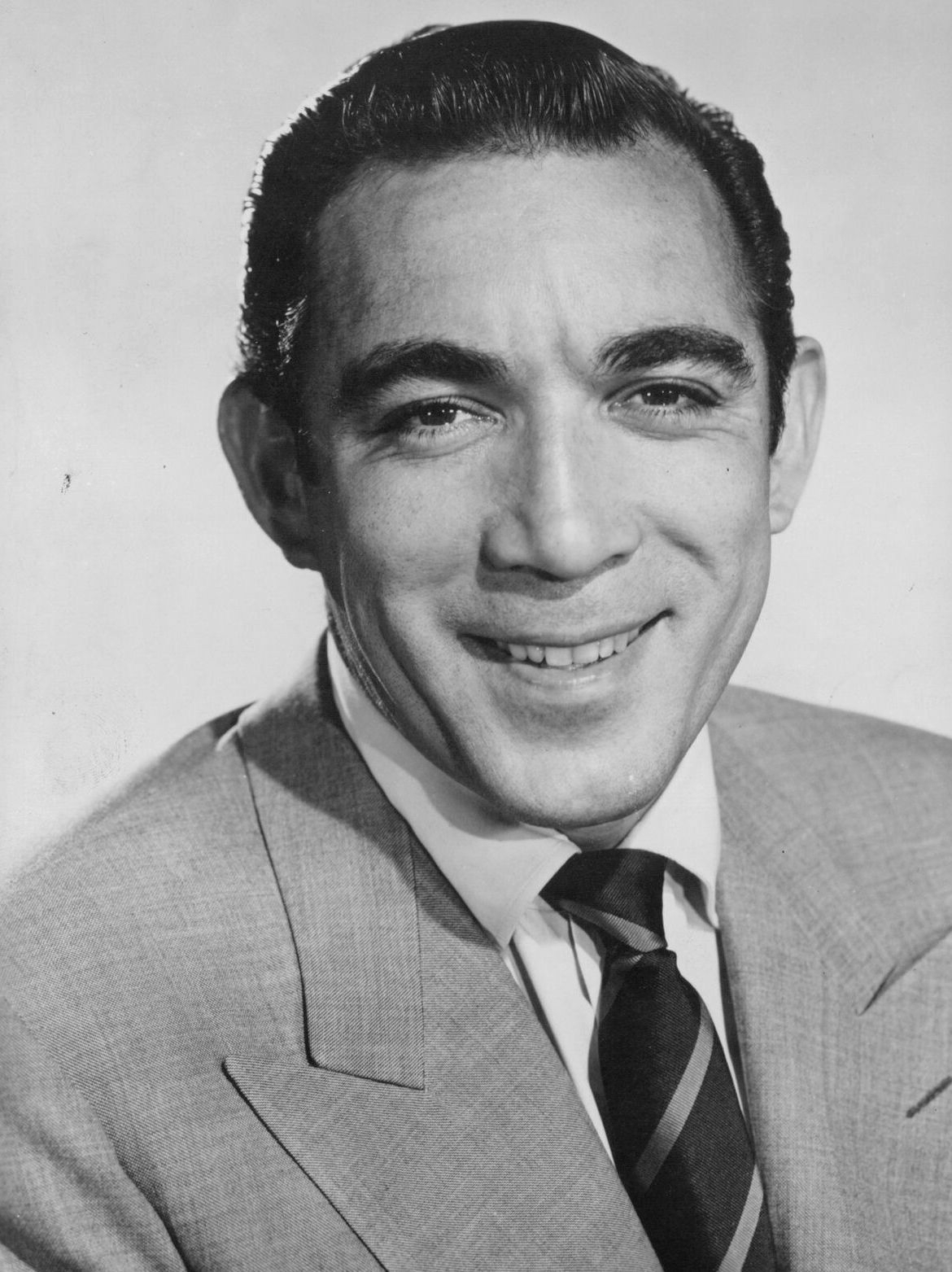
- Quinn, c. 1960s
- Born: Manuel Antonio Rodolfo Quinn Oaxaca; April 21, 1915; Chihuahua City, Chihuahua, Mexico
- Died: June 3, 2001 (aged 86); Boston, Massachusetts, U.S.
- Burial place: Quinn Family Estate; Bristol, Rhode Island, U.S.
- Citizenship: Mexico; United States
- Occupations: Actor; film director; painter; sculptor; restaurateur; writer
- Years active: 1936–2001
- Spouses: Katherine DeMille (m. 1937; div. 1965) Jolanda Addolori (m. 1966; div. 1997) Katherine Benvin (m. 1997)
- Children: 12, including Francesco, Danny and Lorenzo

Manuel Antonio Rodolfo Quinn Oaxaca (April 21, 1915 – June 3, 2001), known as Anthony Quinn, was a Mexican and American actor who played in over 100 film, television and stage roles between 1936 and 2001. He was known for his portrayal of earthy, passionate characters "marked by a brutal and elemental virility". His accolades include two Academy Awards and a Cecil B. DeMille Award, in addition to nominations for two BAFTAs, five Golden Globes, a Tony Award, and a Primetime Emmy Award.

Quinn was born in Chihuahua City, Mexico, and was raised in El Paso, Texas, and East Los Angeles. After stints as a boxer and an architect, he made his film debut in the Cecil B. DeMille Western The Plainsman in 1936. Initially typecast as a "heavy" and playing other minor parts as well, he was gradually cast in more substantial parts, including co-starring roles in Blood and Sand (1941) and The Ox-Bow Incident (1943). He won his first Oscar, for Best Supporting Actor, for his portrayal of Eufemio Zapata in Viva Zapata! (1952), becoming the first Mexican-born performer to win an Academy Award. He received his second Oscar in 1957 for Lust for Life.

He would be nominated for Best Actor twice more, for his roles in Wild is the Wind (1958) and Zorba the Greek (1964). His other notable films included La Strada (1954), The Guns of Navarone (1961), Requiem for a Heavyweight (1962), Lawrence of Arabia (1962), Guns for San Sebastian (1968), The Shoes of the Fisherman (1968), Across 110th Street (1972), The Message (1976), Lion of the Desert (1980), Jungle Fever (1991) and Seven Servants (1996). He also starred in the Broadway plays A Streetcar Named Desire (replacing Marlon Brando), Becket (earning a Tony nomination for Best Actor in a Play), and Zorba (reprising his film role).

Aside from his acting career, Quinn was also a civil rights activist, an avid painter, and the author of several autobiographical books. In 1987, he was presented with the Golden Globe Cecil B. DeMille Lifetime Achievement Award. Through both his artistic endeavors and activism, he is considered a seminal figure of Latin-American representation in the media of the United States.

== Early life and education ==
=== 1915–1946: Childhood, studies and early acting ===
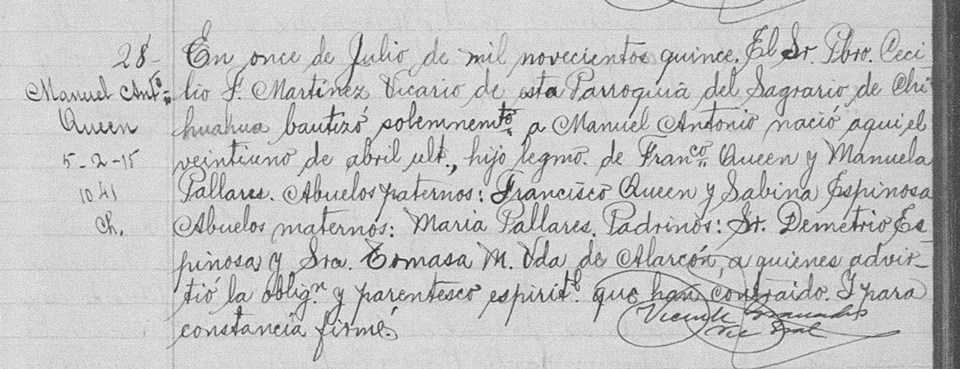
Baptism paper for Quinn, which took place on July 11, 1915

Manuel Antonio Rodolfo Quinn Oaxaca was born April 21, 1915, in Chihuahua, Mexico, during the Mexican Revolution to Manuela "Nellie" (née Oaxaca) and Francisco "Frank" Quinn. Frank Quinn was born to an Irish immigrant father from County Cork and a Mexican mother. Frank reportedly rode with Mexican revolutionary Pancho Villa, then later moved to the East Los Angeles neighborhood of City Terrace and became an assistant cameraman at a movie studio. In Quinn's autobiography, The Original Sin: A Self-Portrait by Anthony Quinn, he denied being the son of an "Irish adventurer" and attributed that tale to Hollywood publicists. Quinn later said he was not accepted in Mexico because of his surname.

When he was six years old, Quinn attended a Catholic church and even contemplated becoming a priest, but at the age of 11, he joined the Pentecostals at the International Church of the Foursquare Gospel, which was founded and led by the evangelical preacher Aimee Semple McPherson. For a time, Quinn played in the church's band and was an apprentice preacher with the evangelist. "I have known most of the great actresses of my time, and not one of them could touch her," Quinn once said of the spellbinding McPherson, whom he credited with inspiring Zorba's gesture of the dramatically outstretched hand.

Quinn grew up first in El Paso, Texas, and later in East Los Angeles and in the Echo Park area of Los Angeles, California. He attended Hammel Street Elementary School, Belvedere Junior High School, Polytechnic High School, and Belmont High School in Los Angeles, with future baseball player and General Hospital star John Beradino, but left before graduating. In June 1987, Tucson High School in Arizona awarded him an honorary high-school diploma.

As a young man, Quinn boxed professionally to earn money, then studied art and architecture under Frank Lloyd Wright at the designer's Arizona residence and his Wisconsin studio, Taliesin. The two men became friends. When Quinn mentioned that he wanted to be an actor, Wright encouraged him. Quinn said he had been offered $800 per week by a film studio and did not know what to do. Wright replied, "Take it, you'll never make that much with me." During a 1999 interview on Private Screenings with Robert Osborne, Quinn said the contract was for only $300 per week.

== Career ==
=== 1936–1952: Beginnings in cinema ===
After a short time performing on the stage, Quinn launched his film career performing character roles in the 1936 films The Plainsman (as a Cheyenne Indian after Custer's defeat with Gary Cooper), Parole (in which he made his debut), and The Milky Way, his first motion picture, although he was not credited. He played "ethnic" villains in Paramount films such as Dangerous to Know (1938) with Anna May Wong and Road to Morocco with Bing Crosby and Bob Hope, and played a more sympathetic Crazy Horse in They Died with Their Boots On with Errol Flynn.

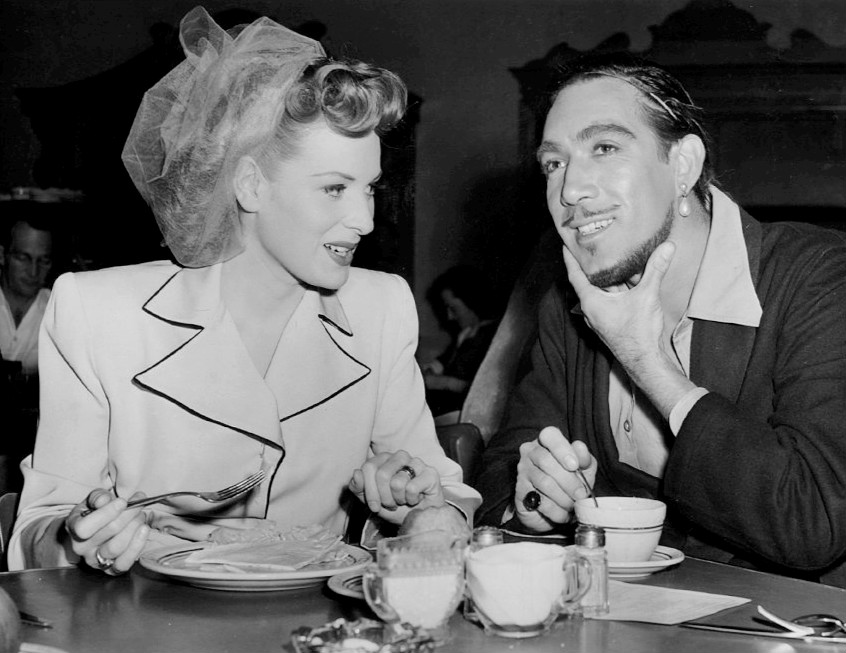
Quinn with Maureen O'Hara, behind the scenes of Sinbad the Sailor (1947)

A breakthrough in his career occurred in 1941, when he received an offer to play a matador in the bullfighting-themed Blood and Sand with Tyrone Power and Rita Hayworth. In 1942, Quinn co-starred alongside Power in another critical and financial success, the swashbuckling adventure The Black Swan. In 1943, he had a role in the Oscar-nominated Western The Ox-Bow Incident. He co-starred in Sinbad the Sailor (1947) with Douglas Fairbanks, Jr. and Maureen O'Hara.

By 1947, Quinn had appeared in more than 50 films and had played a variety of characters, including Indians, Mafia dons, Hawaiian chiefs, Filipino freedom fighters, Chinese guerrillas, and Arab sheiks. He returned to the theater, replacing Marlon Brando as Stanley Kowalski in A Streetcar Named Desire on Broadway. In 1947, he became a naturalized citizen of the United States.

He returned to Hollywood in the early 1950s, and was cast in a series of B-adventures such as Mask of the Avenger (1951). He solidified his position as one of Hollywood's premier actors in Elia Kazan's Viva Zapata! (1952), opposite Marlon Brando. Quinn's performance as Zapata's brother won him an Oscar for Best Supporting Actor while Brando lost the Oscar for Best Actor to Gary Cooper in High Noon. Quinn holds the distinction of being the first Mexican-American to win an Academy Award.

=== 1953–1959: International films and career success ===
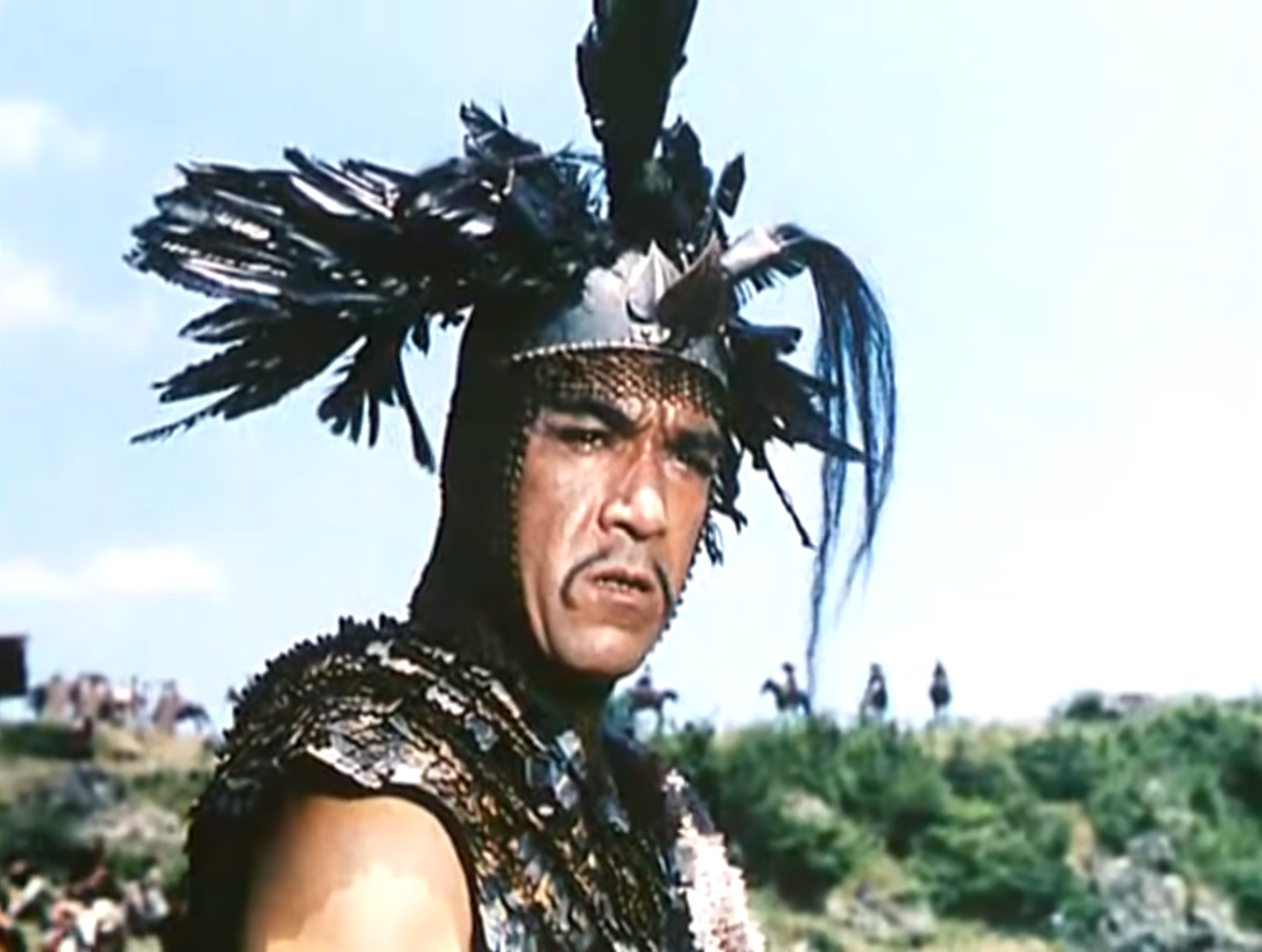
Quinn in Attila (1954)

In the late 1950s, Quinn traveled to Rome, where he collaborated with several renowned Italian filmmakers and established himself as a star of world cinema. He worked with Dino De Laurentiis and Carlo Ponti in the Kirk Douglas film Ulysses, and starred as Attila the Hun, with Sophia Loren, in Attila. In 1953, he turned in one of his best performances as a dim-witted, thuggish, and volatile strongman in Federico Fellini's Oscar-winning La Strada (1954), opposite Giulietta Masina.

Quinn won his second Oscar for Best Supporting Actor for his portrayal of painter Paul Gauguin in Vincente Minnelli's Lust for Life (1956), alongside Kirk Douglas, who portrayed Vincent van Gogh. Quinn also starred as Quasimodo in the French-language film The Hunchback of Notre Dame. Even after his return to the United States, Quinn continued to appear periodically in European films. His frequent portrayal of Italian characters and appearance in Italian films led to the popular misconception that he was, in fact, Italian.

=== 1959–1969: Return to Hollywood and Broadway ===
The following year, he received an Oscar nomination for Best Actor for his part in George Cukor's Wild Is the Wind. Quinn starred in the film The Savage Innocents (1959) as Inuk, an Eskimo who finds himself caught between two clashing cultures. He teamed with Kirk Douglas once again in the Western Last Train from Gun Hill (1959).

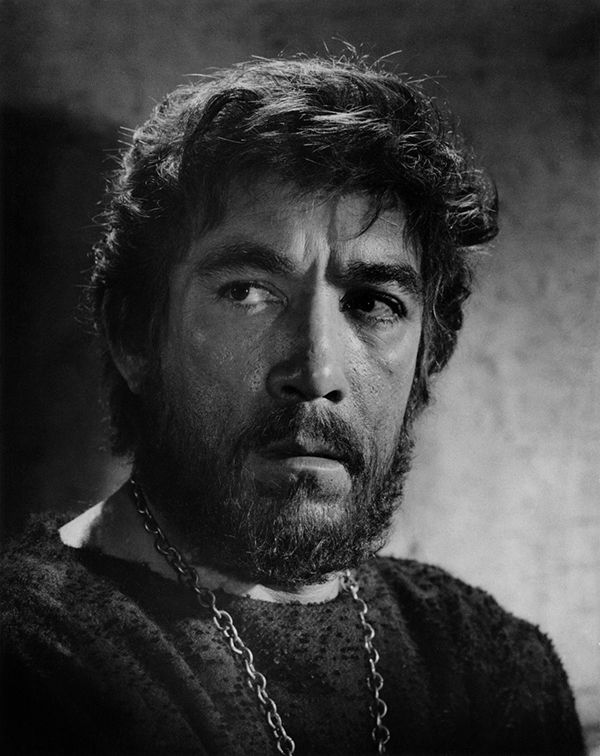
Quinn in Barabbas (1961)

He appeared on Broadway to great acclaim in Becket, as King Henry II to Laurence Olivier's Thomas Becket in 1960. Quinn's performance earned him a Tony Award nomination for best leading actor and Becket received the award for best play. An erroneous story arose in later years that during the run, Quinn and Olivier switched roles and Quinn played Becket to Olivier's King. In fact, Quinn left the production for a film, never having played Becket, and director Peter Glenville suggested a road tour with Olivier as Henry. Olivier happily agreed and Arthur Kennedy took on the role of Becket for the tour and brief return to Broadway.

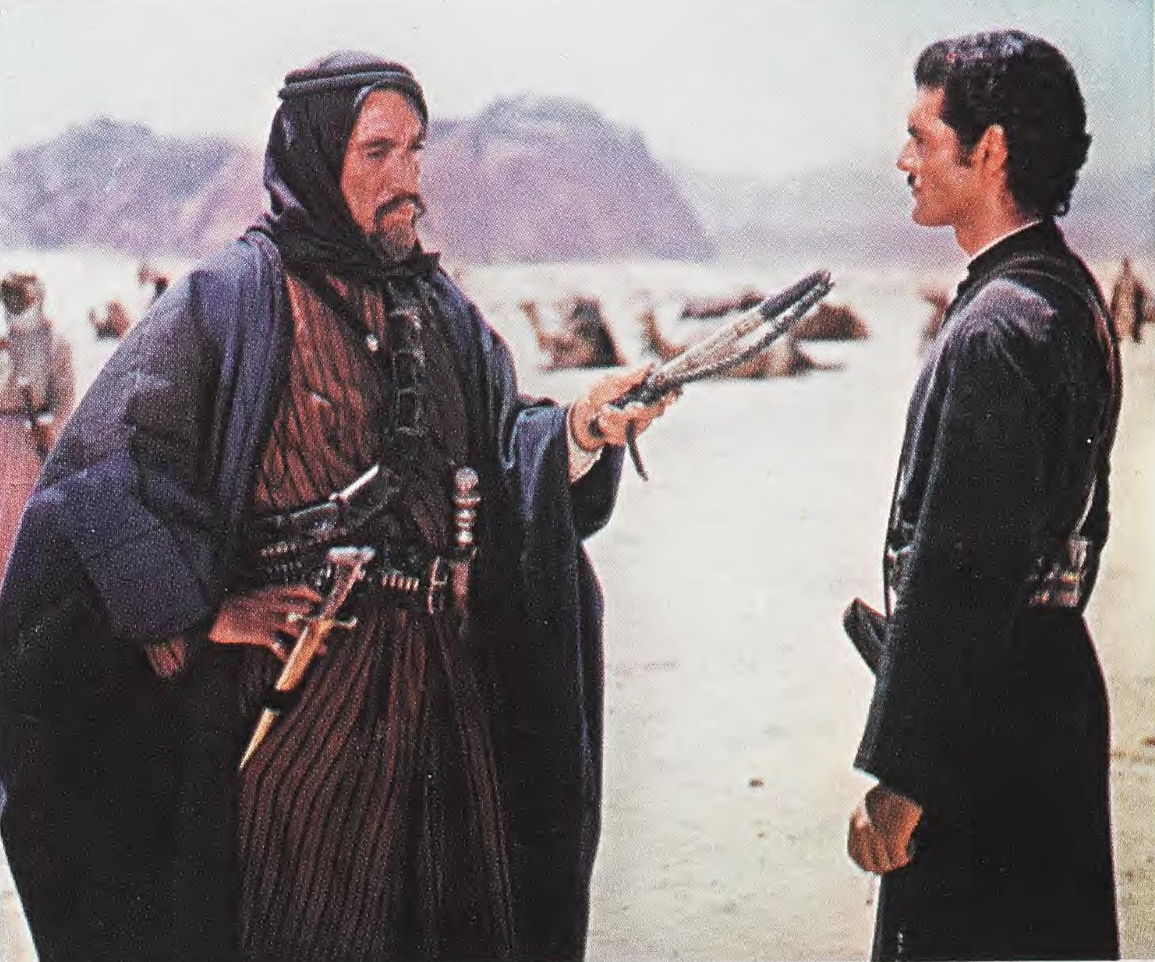
Quinn and Omar Sharif in Lawrence of Arabia (1962)

As the decade ended, Quinn allowed his age to show and began his transformation into a major character actor. His physique filled out, his hair grayed, and his once smooth, swarthy face weathered and became more rugged. He played a Greek resistance fighter in The Guns of Navarone (1961), an aging boxer in Requiem for a Heavyweight, and the Bedouin shaikh Auda abu Tayi in Lawrence of Arabia (both 1962). Lawrence of Arabia would go on to win the Oscar and Golden Globe for best picture, and Quinn received a Golden Globe nomination for best actor alongside co-star Peter O'Toole. He also played the title role in the 1961 film Barabbas, based on a novel by Pär Lagerkvist. In 1962, he returned to Broadway, playing the role of Caesario Grimaldi in the Tony Award-nominated Tchin-Tchin, and had the lead role in the film Requiem for a Heavyweight.

The success of Zorba the Greek in 1964 resulted in another Oscar nomination for Best Actor. Other films included The 25th Hour, The Magus, Guns for San Sebastian, and The Shoes of the Fisherman. In 1969, he starred in The Secret of Santa Vittoria with Anna Magnani; each was nominated for a Golden Globe Award.

=== 1970–1979: Television and later films ===
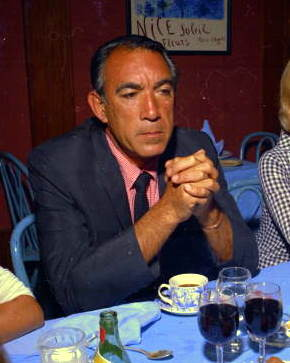
Anthony Quinn, c. 1970

In 1970 Quinn starred as a liberal sociology professor in the campus unrest drama R. P. M., opposite Ann-Margret, and as a Smoky Mountains backwoodsman in A Walk in the Spring Rain, Ingrid Bergman's first American film in 20 years. In 1971, after the success of a TV movie named The City, where Quinn played Mayor Thomas Jefferson Alcala, he starred in the television series, The Man and the City. Quinn's subsequent television appearances were sporadic, including Jesus of Nazareth.

In 1972, he co-starred with Yaphet Kotto in the blaxploitation film Across 110th Street. He played NYPD Captain Frank Martelli, who along with Kotto, was investigating a robbery-homicide of Italian and Black gangsters in Harlem, New York City. He played the old racist, violent captain, against Kotto's modern, educated, enlightened lieutenant.

In 1976, Quinn starred in the movie Mohammad, Messenger of God (also known as The Message), about the origin of Islam, as Hamza, a highly respected uncle of Mohammad, the prophet of Islam. In 1981, he starred in Lion of the Desert. Quinn played real-life Bedouin leader Omar Mukhtar, who fought Benito Mussolini's Italian troops in the deserts of Libya.

In 1979, Quinn starred in the film The Passage, as a Basque shepherd during WWII. He was tasked with leading a scientist and his family across the Pyrenees, while pursued by Nazis. It also starred James Mason and Malcolm McDowell.

=== 1980–1996: Final works ===
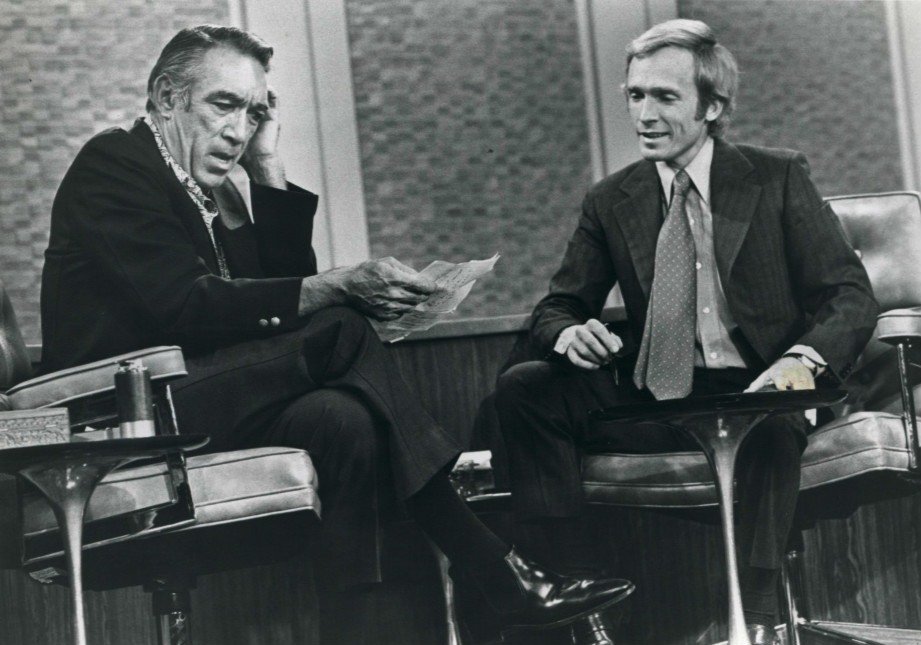
On The Dick Cavett Show (1971)

In 1983, he reprised his role as Zorba for 362 performances in a successful musical version, called Zorba, opposite fellow film co-star Lila Kedrova, reprising her role as Madame Hortense. Quinn performed in the musical both on Broadway and at the Kennedy Center in Washington, DC.

In 1990, he starred in The Old Man and the Sea, a television movie based on the novel by Ernest Hemingway. Quinn's film career slowed during the 1990s, but he nonetheless continued to work steadily, appearing in Revenge (1990), Jungle Fever (1991), Only the Lonely (1991), Mobsters (1991) Last Action Hero (1993), A Walk in the Clouds (1995) and Seven Servants (1996).

In 1994, Quinn played the role of Zeus in five television movies focusing on the legendary journeys of Hercules. These were, in order, Hercules and the Amazon Women, Hercules and the Lost Kingdom, Hercules and the Circle of Fire, Hercules in the Underworld, and Hercules in the Maze of the Minotaur.

In 1995, Quinn starred in A Walk In The Clouds and in his last movie in a lead role in the film Seven Servants, by Daryush Shokof.

== Personal life ==
=== Relationships and children ===
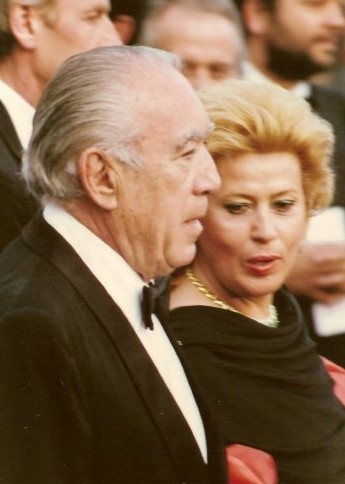
Quinn with his second wife, Jolanda Addolori in 1990

Quinn's first wife was actress Katherine DeMille, the adopted daughter of Cecil B. DeMille; they wed in 1937. The couple had five children: Christopher (1938–1941), Christina (born December 1, 1941), Catalina (born November 21, 1942), Duncan (born August 4, 1945), and Valentina (born December 26, 1952). Their first child, Christopher, aged two, drowned in the lily pond of next-door neighbor W. C. Fields. During his marriage to DeMille, Quinn had an affair with the married actress Evelyn Keyes.

In 1965, Quinn and DeMille divorced because of his affair with Italian costume designer Jolanda Addolori (died 2016), whom he married in 1966. They had three children: Francesco Quinn (March 22, 1963 – August 5, 2011), Danny Quinn (born April 16, 1964), and Lorenzo Quinn (born May 7, 1966).

In the 1970s, during his marriage to Addolori, Quinn also had two children with Friedel Dunbar, an event producer in Los Angeles: Sean Quinn (born February 7, 1973) and Alexander Anthony Quinn (born December 30, 1976).

In the 1990s, Quinn had two children with his secretary Katherine Benvin; daughter Antonia Patricia Rose Quinn (born July 23, 1993) and son Ryan Nicholas Quinn (born July 5, 1996). His marriage to Addolori ended in divorce in August 1997. He then married Benvin in December 1997 and remained married to her until his death.

=== Civil-rights activism ===
Quinn, who experienced discrimination growing up in Los Angeles, participated in various civil-rights and social causes. He provided funding for Latino advocacy group the Spanish-Speaking People's Congress. He assisted in fundraising efforts for the legal defense of Mexican-American youth in the racially charged Sleepy Lagoon murder trial in 1942. While in Paris, several other prominent Americans and he composed a petition endorsing the 1963 March on Washington; the petition, which was reprinted in several high-profile publications, was intended to rally support among Americans living abroad, according to Elliott Miller, writing in CounterPunch. In 1969, Quinn visited with Native American student activists occupying Alcatraz Island in protest, promising to offer assistance. In 1970, Quinn was a panelist at the Mexican-American Conference. In 1971, he narrated a documentary film by the Equal Employment Opportunity Commission, discussing job discrimination faced by Hispanic Americans. He was a supporter of the United Farm Workers organization led by his friend and labor activist Cesar Chavez.

=== Painting and writing ===
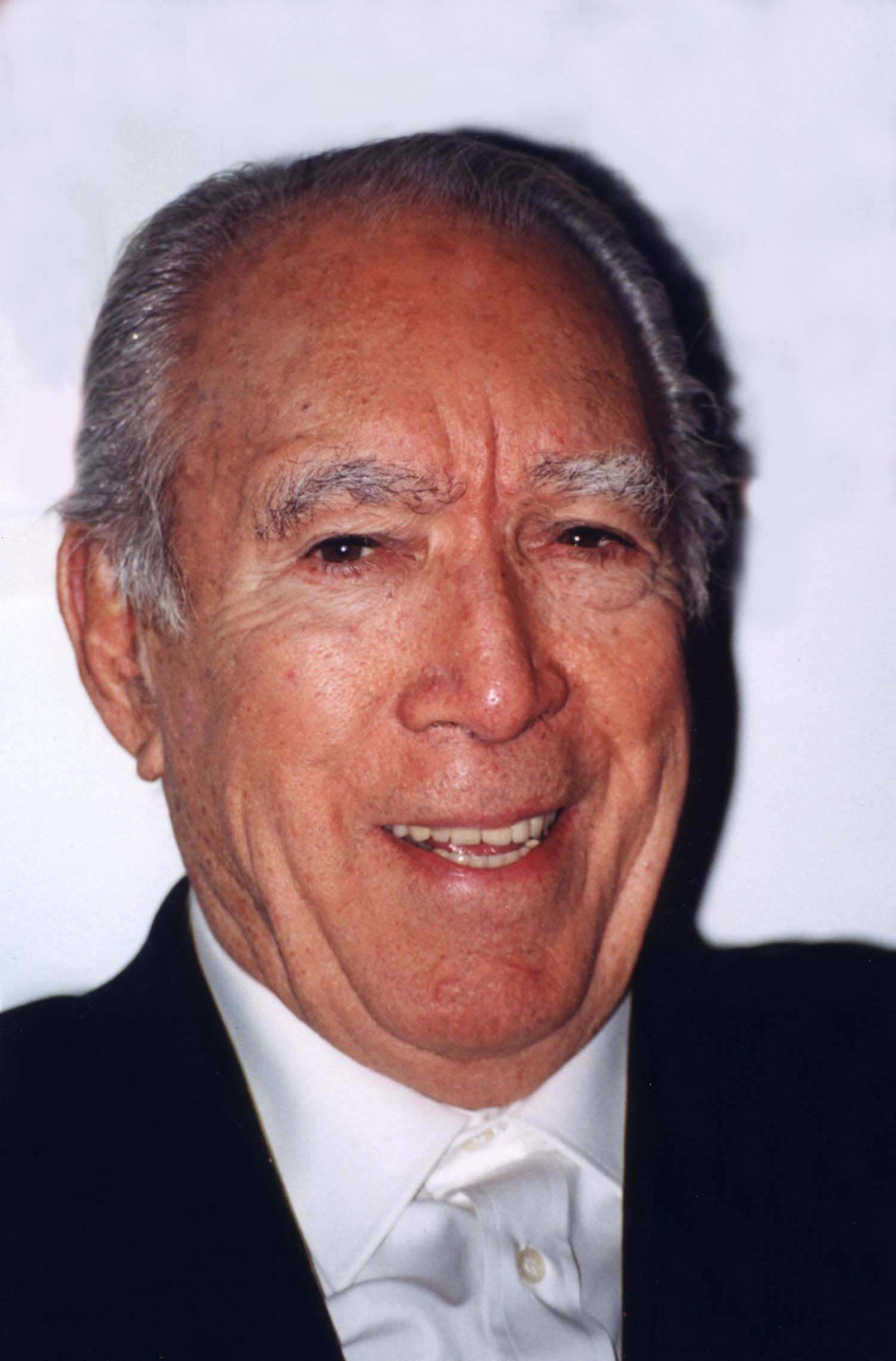
Quinn in 2000

Art critic Donald Kuspit explains, "Examining Quinn's many expressions of creativity together—his art, collecting, and acting—we can see that he was a creative genius."

Early in life, Quinn had an interest in painting and drawing. Throughout his teenaged years, he won various art competitions in California and focused his studies at Polytechnic High School in Los Angeles on drafting. Later, Quinn studied briefly under Frank Lloyd Wright through the Taliesin Fellowship — an opportunity created by winning first prize in an architectural design contest. Through Wright's recommendation, Quinn took acting lessons as a form of postoperative speech therapy, which led to an acting career that spanned over six decades.

Apart from art classes taken in Chicago during the 1950s, Quinn never attended art school; nonetheless, taking advantage of books, museums, and amassing a sizable collection, he managed to give himself an effective education in the language of modern art. By the early 1980s, his work had caught the eyes of various gallery owners and was exhibited internationally, in Mexico City, Los Angeles, New York City, and Paris. His work is now represented in both public and private collections throughout the world.

He wrote two memoirs, The Original Sin (1972) and One Man Tango (1997), a number of scripts, and a series of unpublished stories currently in the collection of his archive.

== Death ==
Quinn spent his last years in Bristol, Rhode Island. He died of respiratory failure (due to complications from radiation treatment for lung cancer) on June 3, 2001, in Boston, at age 86. Quinn's funeral was held in the First Baptist Church in America in College Hill, Providence, Rhode Island. His wife asked for the permission of Bristol authorities to bury him in his favorite spot in the backyard of his house, near an old maple tree. They had bought the property in 1995; it had a view of the Narragansett Bay. Permission was granted and he was laid to rest there.

== Tributes and legacy ==
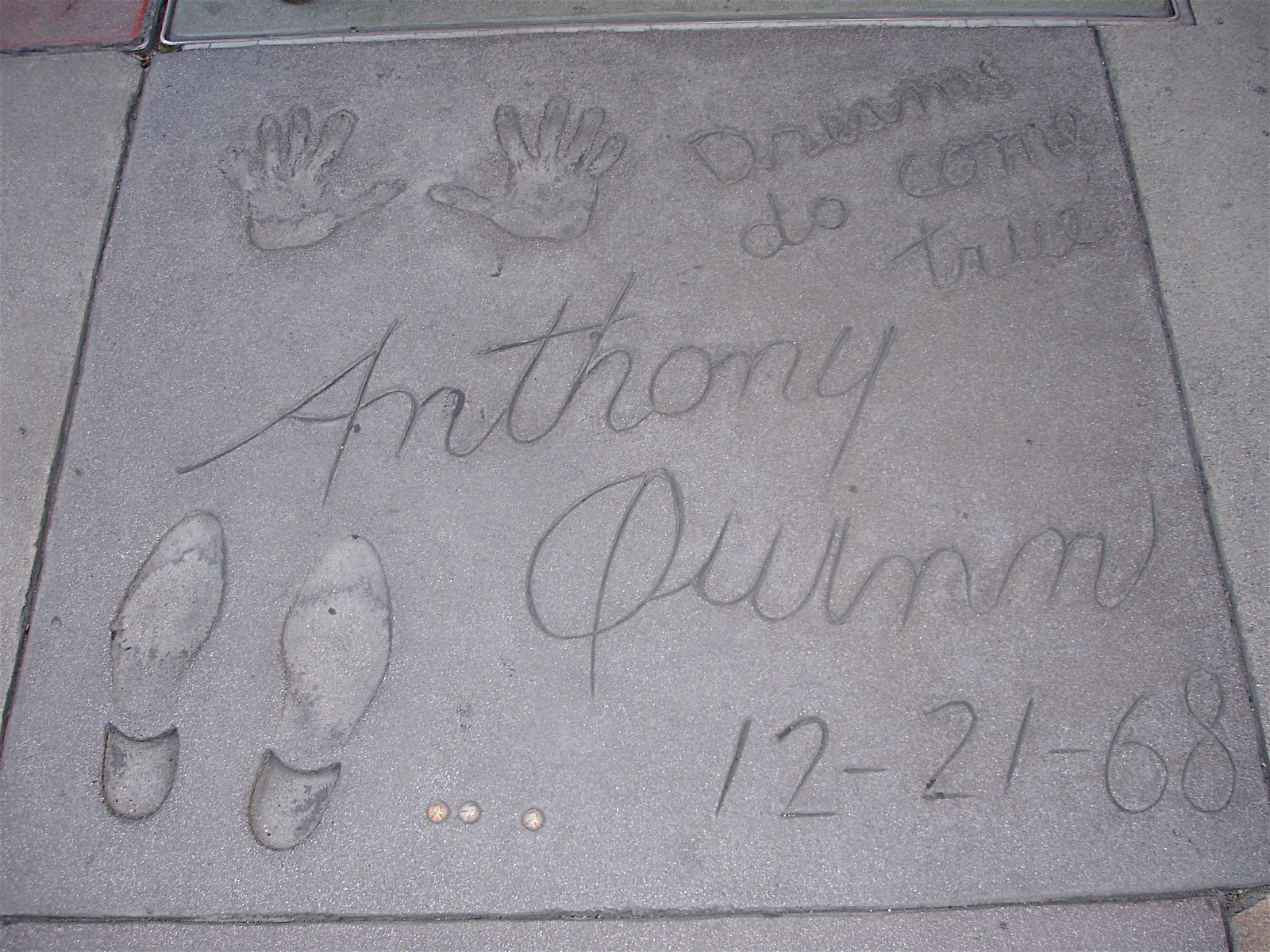
Quinn's hand and footprints outside the Grauman's Chinese Theatre

On January 5, 1982, the Belvedere County Public Library in East Los Angeles was renamed in honor of Anthony Quinn. The present library sits on the site of his family's former home.

In 1984, artist Eloy Torrez produced a 70-foot-high (21 m) portrait mural of Quinn titled both Anthony Quinn and The Pope of Broadway in Los Angeles. It depicts Quinn in his famous Zorba the Greek role, and it remains one of the largest portrait murals in California. Both the portrait mural and Anthony Quinn himself are the subject of a 2018 Google Arts & Culture exhibit.

His birthplace of Chihuahua, Mexico, has a statue of Quinn doing his famous "Zorba the Greek" dance.

An Anthony Quinn Bay and Beach is in Rhodes, Greece, just 2.7 miles (4.3 km) south of the village of Faliraki. Quinn bought the land during the filming of The Guns of Navarone in Rhodes, but it was reclaimed by the Greek government in 1984 due to a change in property law.

Since 2002, the National Council of La Raza has given the Anthony Quinn Award for Excellence in Motion Pictures as an ALMA Award. His widow, Katherine Benvin Quinn, established the Anthony Quinn Foundation, which advocates the importance of arts in education.

== Awards and nominations ==
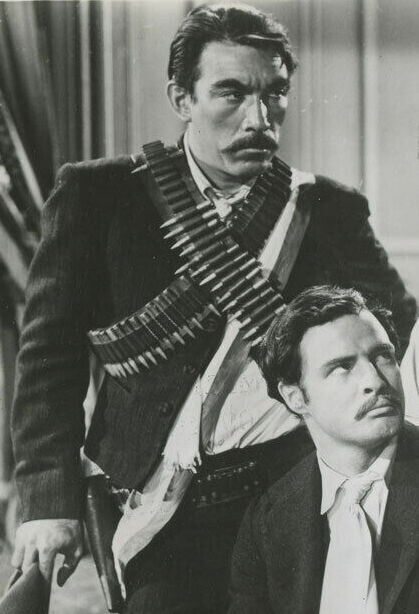
As Eufemio Zapata (standing), with Marlon Brando as Emiliano Zapata in Viva Zapata! (1952)

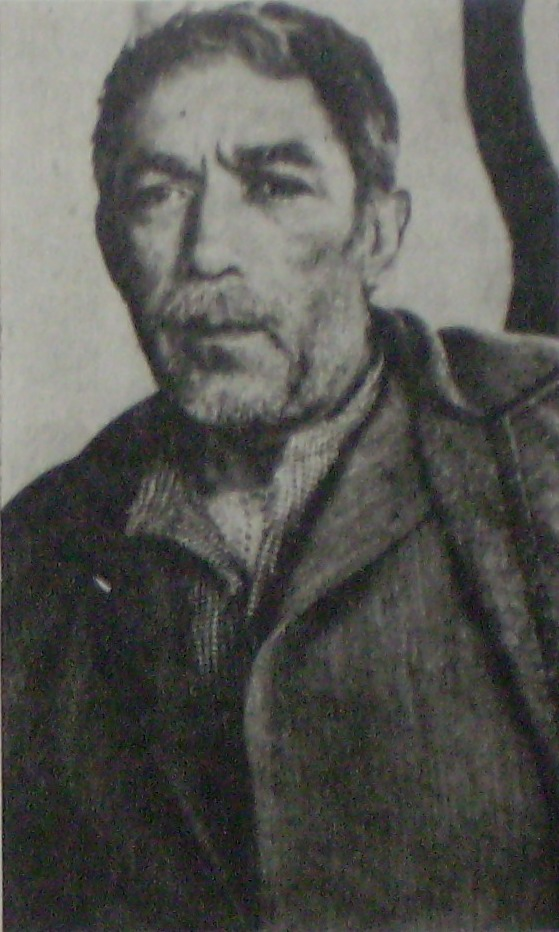
In Zorba the Greek (1964)

Award	Year	Category	Nominated work	Results	Ref.
Academy Awards	1952	Best Supporting Actor	Viva Zapata!	Won	
Academy Awards	1956	Best Supporting Actor	Lust for Life	Won	
Academy Awards	1957	Best Actor	Wild Is the Wind	Nominated	
Academy Awards	1964	Best Actor	Zorba the Greek	Nominated	
British Academy Film Awards	1962	Best Foreign Actor	Lawrence of Arabia	Nominated	
British Academy Film Awards	1965	Best Foreign Actor	Zorba the Greek	Nominated	
Golden Camera Awards	1996	International Lifetime Achievement Award	—N/a	Won	
Golden Globe Awards	1956	Best Supporting Actor – Motion Picture	Lust for Life	Nominated	
Golden Globe Awards	1962	Best Actor in a Motion Picture – Drama	Lawrence of Arabia	Nominated	
Golden Globe Awards	1964	Best Actor in a Motion Picture – Drama	Zorba the Greek	Nominated	
Golden Globe Awards	1969	Best Actor in a Motion Picture – Musical or Comedy	The Secret of Santa Vittoria	Nominated	
Golden Globe Awards	1986	Cecil B. DeMille Award	—N/a	Won	
Golden Globe Awards	1996	Best Supporting Actor – Series, Miniseries or Television Film	Gotti	Nominated	
Golden Raspberry Awards	1991	Worst Supporting Actor	Mobsters	Nominated	
Huelva Ibero-American Film Festival	2001	City of Huelva Award	—N/a	Won	
Laurel Awards	1957	Top Male Dramatic Performance	Wild Is the Wind	4th Place	
Laurel Awards	1959	Top Action Performance	Last Train from Gun Hill	4th Place	
Laurel Awards	1969	Top Male Star	—N/a	11th Place	
Laurel Awards	1969	Top Male Dramatic Performance	The Shoes of the Fisherman	4th Place	
Los Angeles Latino International Film Festival	2001	Lifetime Achievement Award	—N/a	Won	
National Board of Review Awards	1964	Best Actor	Zorba the Greek	Won	
Primetime Emmy Awards	1988	Outstanding Supporting Actor in a Miniseries or a Special	Onassis: The Richest Man in the World	Nominated	
Satellite Awards	1996	Best Supporting Actor – Series, Miniseries or Television Film	Gotti	Nominated	
Stinkers Bad Movie Awards	1978	Worst On-Screen Couple	The Greek Tycoon	Nominated	
Tony Awards	1961	Best Leading Actor in a Play	Becket	Nominated	

== See also ==
- List of Academy Award winners and nominees from Mexico
- List of actors with two or more Academy Awards in acting categories
- List of oldest fathers
