= List of fantasy television programs =

This is a list of fantasy television programs. It includes original television movies, miniseries and television serials in the fantasy genre and its various subgenres. This list excludes fantasy films originally made for the cinema, which are listed at List of fantasy films.

== Television movies and mini series ==
- The Adventures of a Two-Minute Werewolf (1985)
- Angels in America
- The Cave of the Golden Rose
- Dark Kingdom: The Dragon King
- Descendants
- Descendants 2 (2017)
- Descendants 3 (2019)
- Dungeons & Dragons: Wrath of the Dragon God
- Earthsea
- Gormenghast
- Hercules and the Amazon Women
- Hercules and the Circle of Fire
- Hercules and the Lost Kingdom
- Hercules in the Maze of the Minotaur
- Hercules in the Underworld
- The Hobbit
- Jack and the Beanstalk: The Real Story
- Jason and the Argonauts
- Kindred: The Embraced
- Merlin
- Merlin's Apprentice
- The Mists of Avalon
- Neverwhere
- Nick Knight
- Over the Garden Wall
- Salem's Lot
- Snow Queen
- Tales from the Neverending Story
- Tin Man

== Television series ==
=== Canada ===
- The Adventures of Sinbad (1996–1998)
- Beastmaster (1999–2002)
- Blood Ties (2007)
- Camelot (2011)
- Captain Flamingo (2006–2010)
- Forever Knight (1992–1996)
- Friday the 13th: The Series (1987–1990)
- The Listener (2009–2014)
- Lost Girl (2010–2015)
- Missing (2003–2006)
- My Little Pony: Friendship Is Magic (2010–2019)
- Mysticons (2017–2018)
- The Odyssey (1992–1994)
- World of Quest (2008–2009)

=== China ===
- Ancient Love Song (2017)
- Candle in the Tomb (2016–2017)
- Chinese Paladin (2005)
- Chinese Paladin 3 (2009)
- Ever Night (2018)
- Fighter of the Destiny (2017)
- Filly Funtasia (2019)
- Ice Fantasy (2016)
- The Journey of Flower (2015)
- The Little Fairy (2006)
- The Lost Tomb (2015)
- Love Weaves Through a Millennium (2015)
- Martial Universe (2017)
- The Mystic Nine (2016)
- Noble Aspirations (2016)
- Novoland: Castle in the Sky (2016)
- Novoland: Pearl Eclipse (2021)
- Shining for One Thing (2021)
- The Starry Night, The Starry Sea (2017)
- Swords of Legends (2014)
- Three Lives Three Worlds, Ten Miles of Peach Blossoms (2017)
- Tribes and Empires: Storm of Prophecy (2017)
- Wu Xin: The Monster Killer (2015)
- Xuan-Yuan Sword: Scar of Sky (2012)

=== France ===
- Argai: The Prophecy (2000)
- Dragon Flyz (1996–1997)
- Gawayn (2009–2013)
- The Mysterious Cities of Gold (1982–1983)
- Spartakus and the Sun Beneath the Sea (1985–1987)
- Ulysses 31 (1981–1982)

=== India ===
- The Adventures of Hatim
- Agadam Bagdam Tigdam
- Akkad Bakkad Bambey Bo
- Aladdin
- Aladdin - Naam Toh Suna Hoga
- Alif Laila
- Arslaan
- Aryamaan – Brahmaand Ka Yodha
- Baal Veer
- Baalveer Returns
- Badi Door Se Aaye Hai
- Betaal Pachisi
- Bhoothnath
- Brahmarakshas
- Chandrakanta (1994)
- Chandrakanta (2017)
- Chi and Me
- Ek Deewaana Tha
- Gaju Bhai
- Gharwali Uparwali
- Gharwali Uparwali Aur Sunny
- Ghayab Aya
- Hatim
- Hero - Bhakti Hi Shakti Hai
- Ichhapyaari Naagin
- Janbaaz Sindbad
- Jeannie Aur Juju
- Junior G
- Kahani Chandrakanta Ki
- Karma
- Kavach... Kaali Shaktiyon Se
- Maan Na Maan Mein Tera Mehmaan
- The Magic Make-Up Box
- Maha Kumbh: Ek Rahasaya, Ek Kahani
- Maharakshak: Aryan
- Maharakshak: Devi
- Mayavi Maling
- Mohe Rang De
- MTV Fanaah
- Naagarjuna – Ek Yoddha
- Naagin
- Naagini
- Naaginn - Waadon Ki Agniparikshaa
- Nazar
- Ninja Pandav
- Paap-O-Meter
- Prem Ya Paheli – Chandrakanta
- Princess Dollie Aur Uska Magic Bag
- Pritam Pyare Aur Woh
- Pyaar Kii Ye Ek Kahaani
- Qayamat Ki Raat
- Raajkumar Aaryyan
- Rahe Tera Aashirwaad
- Rudra Ke Rakshak
- Sasural Simar Ka
- Seven
- Shaka Laka Boom Boom
- Shaktimaan
- Shaktimaan: The Animated Series
- Shararat
- Singhasan Battisi
- Son Pari
- Super Sisters - Chalega Pyar Ka Jaadu
- Thief of Baghdad
- Vartmaan
- Vicky & Vetaal
- Vikram Aur Betaal
- Yam Hain Hum
- Yam Kisi Se Kam Nahin
- Yom
- Zoran

=== Italy ===
- A come Andromeda
- Alisea and the Dream Prince
- Brivido Giallo
- The Cave of the Golden Rose
- The Chosen
- The Dragon Ring
- E.S.P.
- Gamma
- Houses of Doom
- The Marble Faun
- Mia and Me
- Odissey
- Prezzemolo
- The Princess and the Pauper
- Racconti fantastici
- Ritratto di donna velata
- Il segno del comando
- The Sword and the Heart
- Winx Club

=== Japan ===
- Fairy Tail
- Fullmetal Alchemist
- Gosei Sentai Dairanger
- Hikari Sentai Maskman
- Hyakujuu Sentai Gaoranger
- I was the only kid that was kind
- Juken Sentai Gekiranger
- Kamen Rider Agito
- Kamen Rider Gaim
- Kamen Rider Ghost
- Kamen Rider Hibiki
- Kamen Rider Kiva
- Kamen Rider Ryuki
- Kamen Rider Wizard
- Kyōryū Sentai Zyuranger
- Mahou Sentai Magiranger
- Monkey
- Naruto Shippuden
- Ninja Sentai Kakuranger
- Ninpuu Sentai Hurricaneger
- Pokémon (1997–present)
- Pretty Guardian Sailor Moon
- Samurai Sentai Shinkenger
- Seijuu Sentai Gingaman
- Shuriken Sentai Ninninger
- Taiyo Sentai Sun Vulcan
- Tensou Sentai Goseiger

=== Pakistan ===
- Belapur Ki Dayan
- Dil Nawaz
- Mera Saaya
- Naagin
- Saaya

=== Philippines ===
- 100 Days to Heaven
- Agimat: Ang Mga Alamat ni Ramon Revilla
- Agua Bendita
- Alamat
- Ang Mahiwagang Baul
- Ang Panday
- Atlantika
- Captain Barbell
- Daig Kayo ng Lola Ko
- Darna (2005)
- Darna (2009)
- Darna (2022)
- Dyesebel (2008)
- Dyesebel (2014)
- Dyosa
- Encantadia (2005)
- Encantadia (2016)
- Encantadia: Pag-ibig Hanggang Wakas
- Etheria: Ang Ikalimang Kaharian ng Encantadia
- Hiraya Manawari
- Honesto
- Ikaw ay Pag-Ibig
- Inday Bote
- Juan dela Cruz
- Kampanerang Kuba
- Kokey
- Kokey at Ako
- Komiks
  - Da Adventures of Pedro Penduko
  - Dragonna
  - Flash Bomba
  - Kapitan Boom
  - Nasaan Ka Maruja?
  - Pedro Penduko at ang Mga Engkantao
  - Tiny Tony
  - Varga
- Krystala
- Kung Fu Kids
- La Luna Sangre
- Lastikman
- Leya, ang Pinakamagandang Babae sa Ilalim ng Lupa
- Lobo
- Majika
- Marina
- Marinara
- Mulawin
- Mutya
- My Dear Heart
- My Little Juan
- My Super D
- Nathaniel
- Okay Ka, Fairy Ko!
- One Day Isang Araw
- Panday
- Pinoy Fantasy
- Pintados
- Princess Sarah
- Spirits
- Starla
- Sugo
- Super Inggo
- Wako Wako
- Wansapanataym
  - Buhawi Jack

=== South Africa ===
- The Legend of the Hidden City (1996–1998)

=== South Korea ===
- 49 Days (2011)
- Alchemy of Souls (2022)
- Arang and the Magistrate (2012)
- The Bride of Habaek (2017)
- Gu Family Book (2013)
- Guardian: The Lonely and Great God (2016–2017)
- The Haunted House (2016–)
- Hey Ghost, Let's Fight (2016)
- The King: Eternal Monarch (2020)
- A Korean Odyssey (2017)
- The Legend (2007)
- Legend of the Blue Sea (2016–2017)
- Master's Sun (2013)
- My Girlfriend Is a Nine-Tailed Fox (2010)
- Nine: Nine Time Travels (2013)
- Oh My Ghostess (2015)
- The only day we didn’t have to work I had a dream about it (2013–2014)
- Padam Padam... The Sound of His and Her Heartbeats (2011)
- Queen In-hyun's Man (2012)
- Rooftop Prince (2012)
- Scholar Who Walks the Night (2015)
- Secret Garden (2010–2011)
- Tomorrow With You (2017)
- W - Two Worlds (2016)

=== United Kingdom ===
- Ace of Wands (1970–1972)
- Ashes to Ashes (2008–2010)
- Atlantis (2013–2015)
- Being Human (2008–2013)
- Catweazle (1970–1971)
- Children of the Stones (1977)
- The City and the City (2018)
- The Clifton House Mystery (1978)
- Demons (2009)
- A Discovery of Witches (2018–2022)
- Doctor Who (1963–1989, 2005–2022, 2023–present)
- The Dreamstone (1990–1995)
- Genie in the House (2006–2010)
- The Ghosts of Motley Hall (1976–1978)
- Good Omens (2019–present)
- Jekyll (2007)
- Merlin (2008–2012)
- The Mighty Boosh (2004–2007)
- The Mind Beyond (1976)
- The Moon Stallion (1978)
- Mystery and Imagination (1966–1970)
- Out of the Unknown (1965–1971)
- The Owl Service (1969–1970)
- Primeval (2007–2011)
- Requiem (2018)
- Robin Hood (2006–2009)
- Robin of Sherwood (1984–1986)
- Rocky Hollow (1985–1986)
- Strange Experiences (1955–1962)
- The Tomorrow People (1973–1979, 1992–1995)
- Torchwood (2006–2011)
- The Wind in the Willows (1984–1990)
- Wizards vs Aliens (2012–2014)
- The Worst Witch (2017–2020)
- Yonderland (2013–2016)

=== United States ===
- Adventure Time (2010–2018)
- ALF Tales (1988–1989)
- Amazing Stories (1985–1987)
- American Dragon: Jake Long (2005–2007)
- Amphibia (2019–2022)
- Angel (1999–2004)
- Angel from Hell (2016)
- Avatar: The Last Airbender (2005–2008)
- Beauty and the Beast (1987–1990)
- Beastmaster (1999–2002)
- The Best Sex Ever (2002–2003)
- Bewitched (1964–1972)
- Big Wolf on Campus (1999–2002)
- Blackstar (1981)
- Blood Ties (2007)
- Buffy the Vampire Slayer (1997–2003)
- Bunnicula (2016–2018)
- Carnival Row (2019–2023)
- Carnivàle (2003–2005)
- Cavemen (2007)
- Charmed (1998–2006)
- Charmed (2018–2022)
- Chilling Adventures of Sabrina (2018–2020)
- Cloudy with a Chance of Meatballs: The Series
- Conan the Adventurer (1997–1998)
- Conan the Adventurer (1992–1993)
- Conan and the Young Warriors (1994)
- Constantine (2014–2015)
- Cursed (2020)
- Danny Phantom (2004–2007)
- Dark Crystal: Age of Resistance, The (2019)
- Dark Shadows (1966–1971)
- Dave the Barbarian (2004–2005)
- Dead Like Me (2003–2004)
- The Dead Zone (2002–2007)
- Descendants: School of Secrets (2015)
- Descendants: Wicked World (2015–2017)
- Disenchantment (2018–2023)
- Dorothy and the Wizard of Oz (2017–2020)
- Down to Earth (1984–1987)
- Dramaworld (2016) (co-produced with South Korea and China)
- DreamWorks Dragons (2012–2014)
- The Dresden Files (2007)
- Drop Dead Diva (2009–2014)
- Dungeons & Dragons (1983–1985)
- Early Edition (1996–2000)
- Eastwick (2009–2010)
- The Electric Company (2009–2011)
- Emmanuelle in Space (1994)
- The Emperor's New School (2006–2008)
- The Erotic Traveler (2007)
- The Ex List (2008)
- Faerie Tale Theatre (1982–1987)
- The Fairly OddParents (2001–2017)
- The Fairly OddParents: A New Wish (2024–)
- Fantasy Island (1977–1984)
- Fantasy Island (1998–1999)
- Forbidden Science (2009)
- Foster's Home for Imaginary Friends (2004–2009)
- Friday the 13th: The Series (1987–1990)
- The Funny Company (1963)
- Galavant (2015–2016)
- Galtar and the Golden Lance (1985–1986)
- Game of Thrones (2011–2019)
- Ghost Whisperer (2005–2010)
- Gravity Falls (2012–2016)
- The Grim Adventures of Billy & Mandy (2003–2008)
- Grimm (2011–2017)
- He-Man and the Masters of the Universe (1983–1988)
- He-Man and the Masters of the Universe (2002–2004)
- Hercules: The Legendary Journeys (1995–1999)
- Heroes (2006–2010)
- Heroes Reborn (2015–2016)
- Highlander: The Raven (1998–1999)
- Highlander: The Series (1992–1998)
- Highway to Heaven (1984–1989)
- Hotel Erotica (2002–2003)
- Hotel Transylvania: The Series (2017–2020)
- I Dream of Jeannie (1965–1970)
- The Itsy Bitsy Spider (1994–1996)
- Jem (1985–1988)
- Jennifer Slept Here (1983–1984)
- Joan of Arcadia (2003–2005)
- Just Add Magic (2015–2019)
- Knight Squad (2018–2019)
- Kolchak: The Night Stalker (1974–1975)
- Land of the Lost (1974–1976)
- Land of the Lost (1991–1992)
- The Legend of Korra (2012–2014)
- Legend of the Seeker (2008–2010)
- The Life and Times of Juniper Lee (2005–2007)
- Lost (2004–2010)
- The Magicians (2015–2020)
- Manimal (1983)
- The Maxx (1995)
- Medium (2005–2011)
- Mighty Magiswords (2016–2019)
- Moby Dick and Mighty Mightor (1967–1969)
- Monster Squad (1976–1977)
- Mortal Kombat: Conquest (1998)
- The Mystic Knights of Tir Na Nog (1998–1999)
- Nanny and the Professor (1970–1971)
- The New Adventures of He-Man (1990)
- Ni Hao, Kai-Lan (2007–2011)
- Night Gallery (1969–1973)
- Night Stalker (2005)
- Night Visions (2001–2002)
- Once Upon a Time (2011–2018)
- Once Upon a Time in Wonderland (2013–2014)
- The Originals (2013–2018)
- Out of This World (1987–1991)
- The Outpost (2018–2021)
- The Owl House (2020–2023)
- The Oz Kids (1996)
- Pirates of Darkwater (1991–1993)
- Power Rangers (1993–)
- Pushing Daisies (2007–2009)
- Regular Show (2010–2017)
- Riverdale (2017–2023)
- Roar (1997)
- Roswell (1999–2002)
- Sabrina: Superwitch (1977)
- Sabrina the Teenage Witch (1971–1974)
- Sabrina the Teenage Witch (1996–2003)
- Samurai Jack (2001–2017)
- Sanctuary (2008–2011)
- The Secret Circle (2011–2012)
- The Secret Saturdays (2008–2010)
- Shadow and Bone (2021–2023)
- The Shannara Chronicles (2016–2017)
- She-Ra: Princess of Power (1985–1987)
- Sheena (2000–2002)
- Shirley Temple's Storybook (1958–1961)
- Siren (2018–2020)
- Sleepy Hollow (2013–2017)
- Spawn (1997–1999)
- Special Unit 2 (2001–2002)
- Steven Universe (2013–2019)
- Steven Universe Future (2019–2020)
- The Storyteller (1988–1990)
- Stranger Things (2016–2025)
- Superhero Kindergarten (2021–)
- Supernatural (2005–2020)
- Tabitha (1977–1978)
- Teen Angel (1997–1998)
- Teen Wolf (1986–1987)
- Teen Wolf (2011–2017)
- That's So Raven (2003–2007)
- Thrills (2001)
- Thundarr the Barbarian (1980–1982)
- Tiny Toon Adventures (1990–1995)
- Topper (1953–1955)
- Touched by an Angel (1994–2003)
- Tru Calling (2003–2005)
- True Blood (2008–2014)
- Tutenstein (2003–2008)
- The Twilight Zone (1959–1964)
- The Twilight Zone (1985–1989)
- The Twilight Zone (2002–2003)
- Uncle Grandpa (2013–2017)
- The Vampire Diaries (2009–2017)
- Van Helsing (2016–2021)
- The Wheel of Time (2021–2025)
- Witchblade (2001–2002)
- The Witcher (2019–)
- Witches of East End (2013–2014)
- Wizards and Warriors (1983)
- Wizards of Waverly Place (2007–2012)
- Wonder Woman (1975–1979)
- Wonderfalls (2004)
- Wynonna Earp (2016–2021)
- Xena: Warrior Princess (1995–2001)
- You Wish (1997–1998)
- Young Blades (2005)

=== Other countries ===
- Arabela (Czech Republic, 1979–1981)
- The Bureau of Magical Things (Australia, 2018–2021)
- The Elephant Princess (Australia, 2008–2011)
- Fire Beadman (South Korea, 2005)
- Guinevere Jones (Canada/Australia, 2002)
- H_{2}O: Just Add Water (Australia, 2006–2011)
- Heartless (Denmark, 2014–2015)
- The Hexer (Polish, 2002)
- Maggi & Me (Singapore, 2006–2008)
- The New Legends of Monkey (New Zealand, 2018–2020)
- Split (Israel, 2009–2012)

== Gothic/horror series ==
- The 10th Kingdom
- American Horror Story
- Angel
- Being Human
- Big Wolf on Campus
- Blood Ties
- Buffy the Vampire Slayer
- Charmed
- Dark Shadows
- Demons
- Fear the Walking Dead
- Jekyll
- Kolchak: The Night Stalker
- The Originals
- Salem's Lot
- Sanctuary
- Sleepy Hollow
- Supernatural
- Teen Wolf (1986)
- Teen Wolf (2011)
- True Blood
- The Twilight Zone
- Twin Peaks
- The Vampire Diaries
- The Walking Dead

== See also ==
- Fantasy television
- Fantaserye
- Fantasy film
- List of science fiction television programs
