= The Knights of Castelcorvo =

Italian television series

- Italian: I cavalieri di Castelcorvo
- Genre: Comedy drama; Mystery; Fantasy; Adventure
- Written by: Angelo Pastore; Giulio Antonio Gualtieri; Josella Porto
- Directed by: Riccardo Antonaroli; Alessandro Celli
- Composer: Filadelfo Castro
- Country of origin: Italy
- Original language: Italian
- No. of seasons: 1
- No. of episodes: 15

Production
- Producer: Grazia Assenza
- Cinematography: Leone Orfeo
- Running time: 22–25 minutes
- Production company: Stand by Me

Original release
- Network: Disney+
- Release: November 6 – December 4, 2020

The Knights of Castelcorvo (Italian: I cavalieri di Castelcorvo) is an Italian comedy-drama-mystery-fantasy streaming television series for children and adolescents, which is produced by Stand by Me for the Walt Disney Company. The series premiered on November 6, 2020, in Italy on Disney+.

== Plot ==
In the Italian countryside, away from main paths, lies the village of Castelcorvo. An old castle overlooks the town where residents know each other. Among the cobbled streets and houses, witches and other magical beings reside. The old manor contains mysteries and secrets that a group of people must reveal. Castelcorvo requires protection, and Knights are called to defend it. Four children Giulia, Riccardo, Betta, and Matteo solve puzzles, face fears, and become protectors against threats in Castelcorvo.

== Cast ==
- Fabio Bizarro as Riccardo
- Mario Luciani as Matteo
- Margherita Rebbeggiani as Betta
- Lucrezia Santi as Giulia
- Giada Prandi as Aunt Margherita
- Angela Tuccia as Stria
- Gabriele Rizzoli as Zeno
- Gabriele Scopel as Andrea
- Susanna Marcomeni as Atena
- Eleonora Siro as Mother of Giulia and Riccardo
- Maximiliano Gigliucci as Father of Giulia and Riccardo
- Alessandro Cannava as Aldo
- Andrea Paretti as Bully #1
- Mattia Spera as Bully #2

== Episodes ==
No. overall	No. in season	Title	Original release date
1	1	"The prophecy" "La profezia"	November 6, 2020
Giulia (13 years old) and Riccardo (11 years old) arrive in Castelcorvo, in the country house their Aunt Margherita has just bought to turn it into a B&B: their parents have to leave due to business asking Margherita to keep the kids with her. Giulia and Riccardo, however, don't know anyone there and Riccardo is downhearted since his mobile has no Internet service. The siblings strike up a friendship with Matteo (11 years old) and Betta (12 years old), two local kids: he collects pictures of beetles; she's a reckless little girl. Two outsiders the other dudes from Castelcorvo enjoy making fun of. Aldo, the boss of the bullies, is especially fierce about Matteo nicking his phone away as he teases him and then he throws the mobile over a hedge. The place the device lands is the garden of the Twisted Sisters, two old women all the children in town believe to be witches. Though scared to go into that yard, the four kids walk in anyway to get the phone back. Suddenly, however, they are up against the Twisted Sisters. One of the two elderly women bears a raven on her shoulder and gives the boys a strange copper card with a mysterious riddle on it. Then the two appear to declaim a disturbing prophecy: "The journey shall end and one of the knights won't be back again. Forgotten will be and nobody ever will look up to him." The same evening Giulia and Riccardo try to solve the enigma and talk about the prophecy: "Only ramblings of two crazy old ladies", says the boy, "You can't believe they're really witches, can you? Witches do not exist!" That night, Giulia is sleeping in the garret her aunt has turned into a bedroom when she is woken up by the music from the old clock radio on her bedside stand. The little girl opens her eyes and realizes that it's 23:61... An absurd time! And in front of her, there's an unknown guy. As soon as she turns the light on...the boy has disappeared.
2	2	"The Time of the Witches" "L'Ora delle Streghe"	November 6, 2020
Giulia warns her brother Riccardo about what came up the night before, he doesn't believe her thus teases the sister in front of their new friends, Betta and Matteo. Matteo, however, trusts Giulia saw a ghost and that unlikely time the clock radio set - 23:61 - is the infamous "Time of the Witches" his grandmother was used to recount him. The four friends decide to sleep all together in the garret to find out what comes after midnight. Wandering around the village, Giulia meets Zeno - a boy who is pleasantly impressed by her. That night, the four have their "sleepover party": while sharing fear stories to scare Riccardo, the answer to the riddle by the Twisted Sisters turns out. At that very moment the clock radio marks the Time of the Witches and a gate, never been there before, shows up on the wall. It's closed, but as they knock a "ghost boy" appears, whose name is Andrea, in need of their help: he and other children are kept in the Elsewhere, the parallel dimension where the Stria lives, the centuries-old witch who kidnaps the kids of Castelcorvo and makes them been forgotten by their loved ones. Andrea uncovers he is Betta's older brother (but neither she nor her parents recall him, since of the curse of the Stria) and asks the four to side with him to definitely return to the real world. To accomplish the mission two Magic Keys and an old board game - The Knights of Castelcorvo - have to be retrieved. Andrea vanishes just as he came. The day after, Betta asks her parents if she ever had a brother, but they look at her dumbfound; though she believes the "ghost" couldn't lie, so asks her friends: 'will you help me to get him back?' Giulia, Riccardo and Matteo say 'yes': they will look for the board and go to the Elsewhere to rescue Andrea.
3	3	"The mysterious game" "Il gioco misterioso"	November 6, 2020
Riccardo and the others are in search of "The Knights of Castelcorvo" board game, but no one has ever heard of it nor there's any fact on the web. Betta tries a more "analogical" attempt and pushes the group to look for it in the odd local store (a fascinating place though stuffed with useless junk, pretty old games, faded papers) triggering the first of many squabbles with Riccardo, all engrossed in "modern city boy" against "raw country girl". Even the search in the emporium goes unsuccessful: that game doesn't seem to exist. Aunt Margherita, however, just found some old stuff in the basement of the B&B, drops it off at a second-hand store. Betta chases after the man's van and manages to recover at the eleventh hour what they are looking for, a game housed in a strange wooden box whose dashboard is but the map of Castelcorvo. The arcane game resembles a Goose Game, where the squares on the board matches the real spots in town and the pawns are shaped up just like the players themselves. The aim is finding two Magic Keys, the Morning Key and the Evening Key, the former to enter the Elsewhere, the latter to get out. The only way to succeed is to clear the enigmas shown on the game cards. Before the play even begins, however, an opening riddle has to be untied and a vow has to be taken, just as medieval knights were used to. Only the pure-minded can overcome. The four look at one another, then put their right hand on top of each other, swearing to become four champions without stain or fear. The Knights of Castelcorvo are born.
4	4	"The Morning Key" "La Chiave del Mattino"	November 13, 2020
After being sworn in as knights, Riccardo, Giulia, Betta and Matteo have to solve a new enigma to recover the Morning Key. The dashboard of the game sends them to the old fountain beside of the manor of Castelcorvo. Here Giulia manages to unravel the riddle, though the Morning Key retrieval has to be at sunrise, so the four friends return to the spot the following day at dawn. Getting the key, however, is not as simple as they think: the four will have to overcome another test and really prove to be true knights, without stain and without fear. Thanks to Giulia - who manages to infuse everyone with her courage - and by remaining united, they succeed in taking the Morning Key from the bottom of the tank. They all celebrate together, but it's just the beginning... Before entering the Elsewhere they need to collect the Key of the Evening too. In the meantime Giulia meets Zeno again, the mysterious and charming guy she had a crush on after he beat Aldo and the other bullies. Despite this, Riccardo and Matteo don't trust Zeno. Giulia and Betta think they're just jealous since the dude is really cool. But the two insist that guy is weird! None knows it yet, but the two are right: Zeno is actually the Stria's son and he's also looking for the keys.
5	5	"The brooding hunk" "Il bel tenebroso"	November 13, 2020
Giulia, Riccardo, Betta and Matteo have a new puzzle to solve to advance and find the second key. This time the dashboard suggests to look at Aunt Margherita's house, but the guys don't know where or what to look for... It's all about figure out what the cryptic phrase ”One Hundred Alligators Swim All Together in the Aquarium” refers to. Meanwhile, Zeno, the son of the Stria, who forces them to reveal everything they know about the Elsewhere and the magic keys, hypnotizes the four. Giulia - still crushing on him - even invites him home to watch the game. He appears to be pretty interested and finds the way to remain alone and find out where the Morning Key is hidden. When Giulia and Zeno go out for a walk, Riccardo, Matteo and Betta climb into the garret: the key seems to have disappeared and the three kids accuse each other of naivety, ending up arguing. Giulia returns just in time to clear that the Morning Key is safe since she has always been keeping it in the pocket. But it is too late; Betta no longer trusts the group and wants to look for her brother by herself. Is this the end of the Knights of Castelcorvo?
6	6	"Back to the drawing board" "Ricominciamo da capo"	November 13, 2020
The game sent the Knights of Castelcorvo to the town square where there is the old clock tower. Broken for years, it always marks the same time: 10:20 a.m. There is a new riddle to solve, but after the argument the previous day the group is still divided by bad moods and stances by pride. Betta demands an apology from Riccardo, but he is not willing to admit his mistakes... Going ahead in the search is more challenging than expected; therefore the riders must set quarrels apart and resume working as a team. While the kids argue, Aldo and his gang arrive. The Knights split up and run away, chased by the bullies, but after having crossed the streets of the village they find themselves again facing the old clock... and none seem to realize what just happened. The bullies are back, the kids sunder and run away once more... only to find them back in the place again. And again. And again. Riccardo wises up to being trapped in a time loop, since even their mobiles keep the same time: 10:20, just like the broken clock. And - like in video games - until they solve the puzzle and pass the level they're in, they can't move on to the next stage. To break a time loop you can't get stuck on your own steps: that's why Riccardo apologizes to Betta and Matteo for his misbehavior. Overcome their coldness and solved the riddle, the Knights discover it's not over, yet: the rescue lies in fixing the broken clock. How shall they succeed? Here comes the mysterious device found in Aunt Margherita's cellar. Now the loop is unlocked and the Knights are free to return home, where they find a new card... pretty unlike the previous: this time bears a QRCode to download the App of the game “The Knights of Castelcorvo”: a brand new riddle... to clear in less than three hours!
7	7	"Double riddle" "Doppio enigma"	November 20, 2020
An App has replaced the dashboard, showing two new boxes, corresponding to the park and the town store. Giulia, Riccardo, Betta and Matteo have to reach two different sites, with two diverse enigmas to clear... And on the App there's also a timer that beeps an unmerciful countdown! The Knights of Castelcorvo have only three hours to solve the double puzzle to carry on their quest, find the Evening Key and save Andrea, Betta's brother. Three hours are few, maybe not enough for two riddles to unlock in two places far apart. The kids then decide to split up: Betta goes with Matteo to the park, while Riccardo and Giulia move to the store. Each team has to work out a riddle first, then look for a number, then catch an elusive hook-up about a "sphere"... A parallel challenge they are risking not to puzzle out, as time runs relentlessly and the timer gets even closer to 00:00:00... More, Riccardo mistrust Zeno as he finds out he is spying on them, yet he doesn't know the Stria's son is also using his crows to control their moves. All seems lost, but Giulia finds the solution, as time is about to expire. The game's dashboard then unlocks a new square, commanding the Knights to go to the woods surrounding Castelcorvo: that's where the Evening Key is kept... Which threats will await our players to get hold of it?
8	8	"The Evening Key" "La Chiave della Sera"	November 20, 2020
Betta, Giulia, Riccardo and Matteo go into the woods surrounding Castelcorvo in search of the Evening Key that - matched with the Morning key, already theirs - will allow to reach the Elsewhere to save Betta's brother, held prisoner by the treacherous Stria. What are they looking for? The new riddle, promptly solved by Matteo, suggests it: "to uncork me nothing you need, to lock me calls for a spell; I'm the cradle of those who wing, and the fair trail I will tell". The answer is "egg", but what's that mean? The kids go further and further along a path in the forest becoming even thicker, through the darkness, as the sun is about to set. A road that Betta knows well as she has been many times looking for mushrooms with her father though weirdly ends in a clearing where a strange building stands, a small Gothic temple, she had never seen before. A "phantom" building, yet another oddity of Castelcorvo... full of all kind of eggs inward. Amid these, Betta and Giulia find a plaster egg with something clinking in...maybe the Magic Key? Matteo is in a hurry and smashes the chalk egg on the ground; inside, however, there is nothing but a small parchment held by a brass ring with an invitation to Matteo on: he has to go even further into the woods and find the Evening Key on his own. The little boy, the most spooked of them all, goes into the thick of the forest. He is afraid and all of a sudden he hears an inhuman and profound voice calling out: it is that of a scaring tree with the features of a manlike bull. Matteo wants to run off, but some roots are holding his ankles. And the tree tells him the key will be delivered in exchange for his greatest secret. If not, he will be turned into a tree and trapped there forever. It's tough to shout to the leaves he has always been in love with Betta, though this confession saves him and discloses the Evening Key. Proudly back to the Knights, he is warmly welcomed, but he refuses to share the fact since he is ashamed facing Betta. The four friends rush home: now they have both keys, they can open the Shade Gate that very evening. On the way back Giulia meets Zeno and stops to talk to him: the Stria's son tries to hypnotize her, though something blocks him: yet he doesn't know, but he is falling in love with her and this nullify magical powers. Giulia runs home in tears, let down the boy she thought was fond of her just sought the keys. At midnight the Knights all gather in the garret facing the Shade Gate and open it; cross the threshold and enter the Elsewhere. What's waiting for them?
9	9	"Into the Stria's world" "Nel mondo della Stria"	November 20, 2020
Giulia, Riccardo, Betta and Matteo explore the Elsewhere: passing through the door they are inside the old manor of Castelcorvo. But while in their world it is deserted - full of junk, dust and cobwebs – here the Elsewhere appears inhabited... by the Stria. Portraits of the witch are everywhere (and, even if our Knights don't notice it, the paintings keep an eye on them from the very moment they set foot in the castle) children's laughter comes from the upper floors. As soon as they open the window, the Knights realize they are surrounded by the nothingness! It's another dimension, outside of space and time. There is no longer the village of Castelcorvo, just the Castle, the Stria and the forgotten children held prisoner. Several rooms overlook very long hallways; groups of kidnapped children playing there. To look for Andrea, the kids make up two couples: Riccardo and Betta will stay downstairs to open the mysterious doors that lead to the rooms of the forgotten children; Giulia and Matteo will check the upper floor. Furtively, Giulia puts one of the two keys in his brother's pocket. A clever gesture, which will turn out to be very precious. Wandering in the castle the Knights soon experience the power of the Stria, keeping children close and absent-minded by promising what they desire. Even the Knights are bewitched and charmed by the illusions, only Giulia and Betta manage to resist, as Riccardo e Matteo end up as prisoners of their dreams. Betta goes on alone to find her brother to embrace him again. Meanwhile, however, Giulia enters a room and sees pictures of the Stria with Zeno. A feeling the Stria herself backs up: the boy Giulia fell in love with is actually her son. They could stay unite forever, there in the Elsewhere, if she gives away the keys...
10	10	"Escape from the Elsewhere" "Fuga dall'Altrove"	November 27, 2020
Giulia faces the Stria, who claims the magic keys. The little girl keeps only the Morning Key. The Stria touches Giulia's forehead and sees the Evening Key she left in her brother's pocket. The witch goes into a rage, so she traps Giulia together with Matteo and goes after the other guys. All the while, Andrea has taken Betta to the Room of Remembrances, where the witch keeps the memories of the captive children: recovering Riccardo's mind seems the only way to free break the spell he's under. Their plan works, like Giulia's, who moves Matteo to give up the very rare beetles received from the witch: thus the little boy can leave the room with his friend. However, the Stria has found Andrea and Betta, who manage to occupy her with a trick and escape: the two reunite first with Riccardo, then with Giulia and Matteo. The Knights are all full up with Andrea, can leave the Elsewhere back to their world, even if the Stria stand against. The Shade Gate is there. Giulia is about to approach the keyhole when is blocked by an illusion: Zeno appears, claiming the keys and asking her to stay. Actually, the Knights see the phantom is an armor come to life and is about to grab Giulia, unaware. They pull her away at the very last moment, while the Stria is about to succeed. Our heroes cross the threshold and escape the Elsewhere; the Stria is left screaming in anger. Giulia, Riccardo, Betta, Matteo and Andrea return home, sure they have won... But none summon them up: in and out the Elsewhere has made them forgotten children too. Our Knights live one of the greatest fears: none to relieve means therefore being alone...
11	11	"Dimenticati!" "Dimenticati!"	November 27, 2020
Betta and Andrea go home together: the little girl is happy her brother is secure and he can't wait to see his parents again... But they still don't remember him, nor Betta anymore. Matteo, Giulia and Riccardo have been forgotten too. Coming from Elsewhere, the Knights of Castelcorvo have become forgotten children! The kids are miserable: they thought they've been successful, rather what a mess they're in! How to break this curse? The game has to keep going, trying to solve the new enigma and find some strange items. The quest brings Giulia, Riccardo, Betta, Matteo and Andrea to the gates of the Twisted Sisters. Unlike all the others, the two old witches recognize the Knights and invite them in: many issues need to be cleared. In the meantime, the Stria is in a rage since Zeno has fallen in love with Giulia: that's why he refuses to help the mother to leave the Elsewhere. The witch then relies on an Exile, a ghosts wandering on Earth, freezing everything he touches and stealing human appearance and identity by creeping into the bodies. She entrusts him with the task of finding the Magic Keys and imprisoning her son, whom she no longer trusts.
12	12	"Icy eyes" "Occhi di ghiaccio"	November 27, 2020
The Twisted Sisters confess to the Knights of Castelcorvo they are good witches, who have always been enemies of the Stria and tell the story of the Magic Keys: stolen from the Stria therefore she could no longer kidnap anyone, thus hid. They created the game so that only those brave-hearted as ancient knights could recover the keys. The sisters warn our heroes: the Stria will do everything to succeed. She feeds her youth with the memories drawn from those who remain in our world and need to recover the keys to capture the kids to trigger the course. The Twisted Sisters, with the stuff brought by the Knights, make a counter spell to fight the Stria's curse: they can be reminded again. But the magic won't last long and soon they will be consigned to oblivion...forever. The only way to fight it for good is destroying the Stria. To accomplish that, they must find a third key, the Midnight Key. It is the hardest to get: it's hidden by the Stria herself, who has entrusted it to the Lord of Whispers: the supreme key, the one able to annihilate the Stria redeeming her feelings. Betta and Andrea go home together and it's like the boy has always been there: no memory of his disappearance. The other Knights also return to their families reliving them again. However, the Twisted Sisters have spoken clearly: they must solve the new riddle and find the Midnight Key before the next full moon or they will be definitely forgotten. They will have to face a terrible new villain, the Exile; the specter resembling whoever looks into his icy eyes...
13	13	"No way out" "Senza via d'uscita"	December 4, 2020
The Knights try to solve the riddle and find the Midnight Key, but as they explore the surroundings of Castelcorvo in search of a \"house with no doors and windows\" they meet Aldo and the other bullies of the town... who are possessed by the Exile and want to catch the Knights to deliver the Morning and the Evening Key to the Stria. They split up and run away into the fields, getting lost in a maze of trees. The bullies are on their tracks and Zeno - freed from the Exile's entrapment - reaches our dejected heroes. Zeno knows how to face the specter and with a trick he definitely defeat him, chasing him away from the bodies of Aldo and the gang. Then he led the Knights out of the labyrinth thanks to the signs of the crows from above. The guy wants to help the search for the Midnight Key: he chose to deceive his mother and allow her to recover the feelings and end her reign in the Elsewhere, thus freeing all the Forgotten Children. As a token, Zeno gives Giulia a dreamcatcher-style bracelet with crow feathers. It's a charm and will help her in the final battle. But Giulia doesn't know whether to trust him completely and refuses a kiss.
14	14	"Cave fear" "La grotta della paura"	December 4, 2020
The Knights find out the Midnight Key is hidden inside a cave not far from Castelcorvo. The terrible Lord of Whispers, a demon mastering mirages and illusions, however, guards the key: his power is able to unleash the most terrible nightmares, to make the greatest fears of his victims come true. Our young heroes know that overcoming it is almost beyond their limits: failure means becoming forgotten children wandering the world without anyone summoning them up anymore. The Knights, whom Zeno has also joined to, reach the cave: the illusions the demon evokes are bundles, but they are focused on the mission, like true knights. They repeat the oath of the knights all together, like a mantra. By resisting the illusions, they manage to defeat him. The Knights of Castelcorvo thus obtain the Third Key, the Midnight Key. It is the almighty: the Key to the heart of the Stria, to give her back feelings and humanity, depriving her of powers. Now our heroes, all six together, cross the threshold of the Elsewhere again, ready to fight against an angry Stria...rather, a lovely and smiling woman welcomes them amid the forgotten children to the party to celebrate their return. The kids are disconcerted: what is the Stria up to?
15	15	"The heart of the Knights" "Il cuore dei cavalieri"	December 4, 2020
The Stria is pretty scared of the Midnight Key. That's why it was hidden centuries before. That's why she decided to tackle the Knights of Castelcorvo with the most efficient weapons she owns: temptation. Thus the Stria offers them huge powers, as well as freedom, in exchange for the three magic keys. Our heroes though are not deceived and do refuse all. The Stria - annoyed - then proposes to play a game: if they win, she will free all the children, otherwise they will give her back the keys and be kept prisoners. Deal!...but the Stria cheated to frighten them better and get them to hand over the magic keys: they suddenly find each locked up alone in a room with a "magic square" to solve. Each of them has three keys. The Knights did go to Elsewhere ready and forged plenty of fake keys to mess up the witch. Furious, she starts looking for the genuine, aware to enter the Elsewhere both the Morning and the Evening Key are required... thus she gets hold of them. Only the Midnight Key - the most dangerous - seems to have disappeared. Arturo, the raven of the Twisted Sisters, keeps it safe. They tricked the Stria: she's definitely beaten; the key enters her heart. A serene smile appears on Stria's face, no shadows of wickedness anymore. Before vanishing, she grins at Zeno and hugs him. The forgotten children are displaced; once recovered the memory they don't even know where they are. Gathered together and quickly lead to the Shade Gate they all go back to their world and their parents. It's our Knights' turn. But Zeno has decided to stay, in the Elsewhere: it's home and he has to find the mother, who he knows is still alive. The prophecy of the Twisted Sisters was fair: "The journey shall end and one of the knights won't be back again. Forgotten will be and nobody ever will look up to him." Giulia says goodbye in tears and kisses him. Then she walks through the gate to our world. She, and all the knights, quickly forgets Zeno. Though she still wears the bracelet, a memento and token of love...
