= Niharika Kareer =

Indian Punjabi film actress (born 1989)

- Born: November 7, 1989 (age 36); Delhi, India
- Education: University of Delhi
- Occupations: Actress, model
- Years active: 2010–present
- Known for: Oye Hoye Pyar Ho Gaya, MTV Splitsvilla
- Notable work: Jugni Furr, Vanavarayan Vallavarayan
- Television: MTV Splitsvilla
- Height: 1.65 m (5 ft 5 in)

Niharika Kareer is an Indian Punjabi film actress born in Delhi.

== Career ==
Kareer appeared in the reality show MTV Splitsvilla. Her video, "Jugni Furr", by Jasmeet, was a hit.

She made her Punjabi film debut in 2013 opposite singer Sharry Mann in Oye Hoye Pyar Ho Gaya, directed by Aditya Sood.

== Filmography ==
Year	Title	Role	Language
2013	Oye Hoye Pyar Ho Gaya	Meet	Punjabi
2014	Vanavarayan Vallavarayan		Tamil
