= Maninder Kailey =

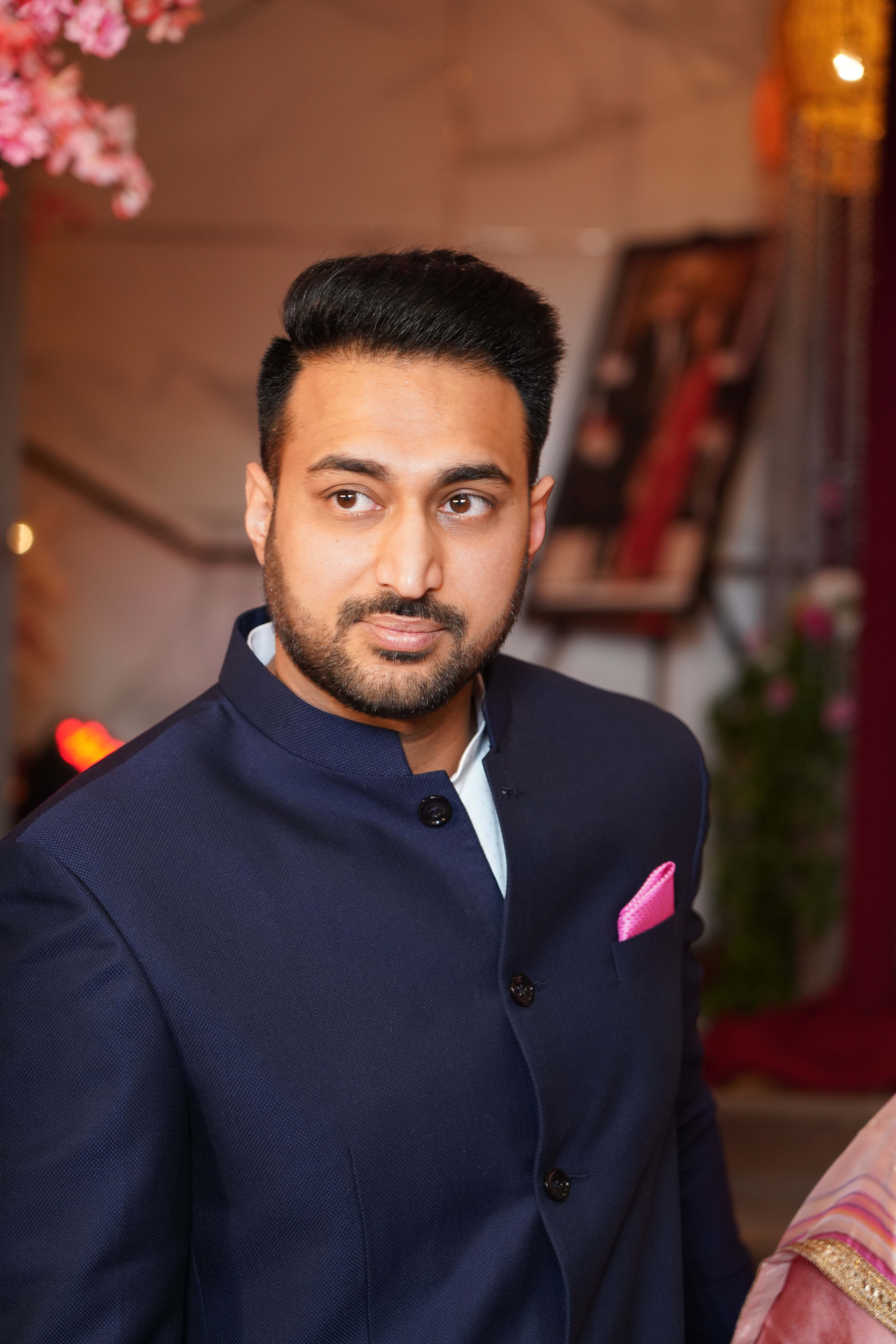
- Maninder kailey
- Born: Punjab
- Occupation: Lyricist
- Years active: 2009–present

Maninder Kailey is an Indian Punjabi songwriter. He is associated with Punjabi cinema. He made his debut with song Tere Bin by Prabh Gill.

== Career ==
In 2009, Kailey made his debut with song Tere Bin by Prabh Gill. He gained recognition after his songs like Pyar Tere Da Asar, Mainu Mangdi, Brober Boli, Kadar and Tareya De Desh.

== Discography ==
- Pyar tere da asar - Prabh Gill
- Minni cooper - Ammy Virk
- Bach naio sakda Prabh Gill
- Kadar - Mankirat Aulakh
- Jaa we mundya - Ranjit Bawa
- Zindagi - Akhil
- Jatt yamala - Sunanda Sharma
- Nakhre - Jassie Gill
- Taryan de desh - Prabh Gill
- Ae kaash - Babbal Rai
- Deewana - Akhil
- Brober boli - Nimrat Khaira
- ishq mera - maninder kailey

== Lyricist in movies ==
| Movie | Songs | Refs. |
|---|---|---|
| Nikka Zaildar | Mini Cooper, Bach Naio Sakda | |
| Goreyan Nu Daffa Karo | Pyar Tere Da Asar | |
| Chandigarh Amritsar Chandigarh | Amritsar de Papad (Title track), Matha | |
| Laatu | Lalariya, Saat Pind | |
| Harjeeta | Sajjna Je Sambhal Geya | |
| Ishq Brandy | Zindgi Ch Aaja Fer Ton | |
| Sat Shri Akal England | Gall Thik Nhi | |
| Jaddi Sardar | Jaan Ton Pyare, Suhe Bulan Waliye | |

== Awards and nominations ==
| Year | Song | Award | Category | Result | Ref. |
|---|---|---|---|---|---|
| 2018 | Tareyan De Des | PTC Punjabi Music Awards | Most Romantic Song Of The Year | Won | |
| 2015 | Kadar | PTC Punjabi Music Awards | 'Most Popular Song of The Year | Won | |
| 2015 | Pyaar Tere Da Asar | PTC Punjabi Film Awards | Popular Song of the year | (Nomination) | |
