= Mar Jawan Gur Khake =

- CD cover
- Directed by: Aditya Sood
- Produced by: Jagdish Sahota
- Starring: Jimmy Sharma; Tarun Khanna; Gurpreet Ghuggi; Gunjan Walia; Shakti Kapoor
- Music by: Santokh Singh
- Release date: 3 December 2010
- Country: India
- Language: Punjabi

Mar Jawan Gur Khake is a 2010 Punjabi film directed by Aditya Sood and produced by Jagdish Sahota. The film was released on 3 December 2010.

== Plot ==
Jimmy (Jimmy Sharma) and Rocky (Tarun Khanna) are enemies who are involved in fights / brawls daily. They fall in love with Mehak (Gunjan Walia) who is already in love with a secret-gangster Karan (Aman Verma). When Karan gets arrested and put in jail by Inspector (Gurpreet Ghuggi), Mehak's father, a bigger don that Karan asks Rocky and Jimmy to rescue him, although the two lovers do not know that Mehak and Karan would get married. When they rescue him and take him back, they seem to find out the truth and Meha also finds out about Karan's real crime identity. When Karan shoots Jimmy, he survives but goes to the hospital. That is when Mehak tells him that she actually loves Rocky. Karan then gets arrested.

The film ends with Rocky and Mehak getting married, as Jimmy comes to wish them.

== Cast ==
- Jimmy Sharma as Jimmy
- Tarun Khanna as Rocky, Mehak's Husband
- Gunjan Walia as Mehak, Rocky's wife
- Gurpreet Ghuggi as Sr. Inspector
- Shakti Kapoor as Don
- Sanjay Mishra as Professor Mishra
- Upasana Singh as Harleen Madam
- Aman Verma as Karan
- Mehar Mittal as DJ Walia
- Gopi Bhalla as Gopi
- Bobby Darling in a special appearance.
