= Simerjit Singh =

Indian film director

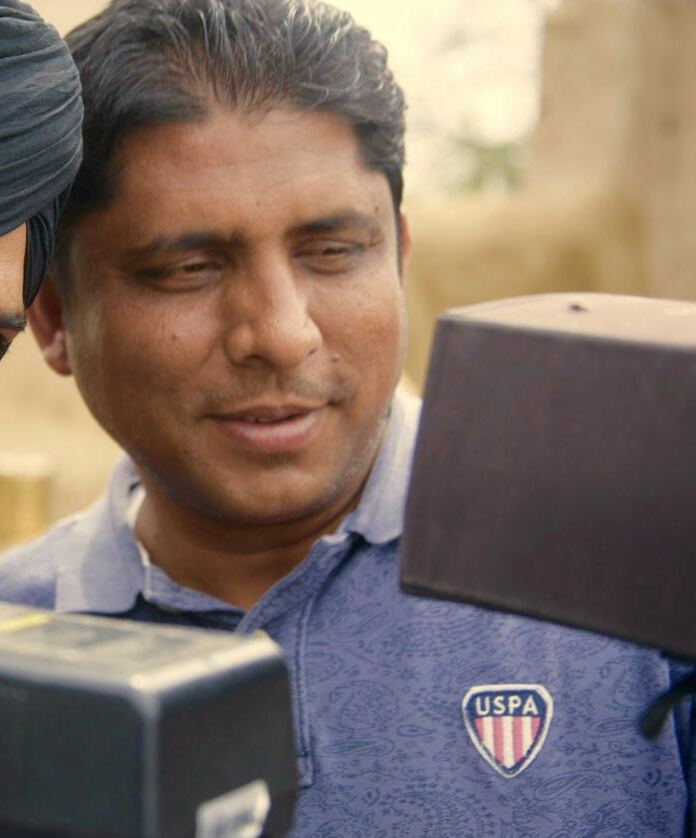
- Singh on the set of Angrej
- Born: 6 December 1973 (age 52); Moga, Punjab, India
- Occupations: Film director; screenwriter
- Years active: 1997–present

Simerjit Singh (born 6 December 1973) is an Indian film director and writer. He is best known for directing the Punjabi film Angrej.

== Career ==
After completing his graduation Simerjit moved to Mumbai in 1997 to pursue his passion of films. He started his career as an assistant director to Director Anees Bazmee for his second directorial venture, Pyaar To Hona Hi Tha (1998), After that he joined to Anil Devgan for Raju Chacha (2000) & Blackmail (2005), He also assisted to Rohit Shetty for his directorial debut film, Zameen (2003). While doing Blackmail he gets a chance to work as a chief assistant director for his first Punjabi film Waris Shah: Ishq Daa Waaris (2006) Directed by Manoj Punj. This film was his last film as an assistant.

Simerjit made his directorial debut with his own written Punjabi film Chak Jawana (2010) starring Gurdas Maan, Jonita Doda, Rana Ranbir, Karamjit Anmol, and Harry Sharan. Although this film could not do well on box office. His second film was Daddy Cool Munde Fool (2013) starring Harish Verma, Amrinder Gill, Ihana Dhillon, Yuvika Chaudhary, Jaswinder Bhalla, Amar Noorie & Rana Ranbir. This film scored the fifth highest Punjabi film opening week collections at the time of release with an opening week collection of Rs 2.60 cr. The next venture of Simerjit was film Baaz (2014), an action Drama starring Babbu Maan, Pooja Verma, Yograj Singh, Sardar Sohi and Mukul Dev is in negative role. His latest released film Angrej (2015) starring Amrinder Gill, Aditi Sharma, Sargun Mehta, Ammy Virk and Binnu Dhillon, became huge success at the box office. Currently he is working for his upcoming Punjabi film Nikka Zaildar starring Ammy Virk, Sonam Bajwa, karamjit Anmol, & many more. This is a family Drama film full of comedy and Punjabi flavored punches, Produced by Patiala Motion Pictures. Nikka Zaildar was scheduled to be released on 11 November 2016.

== Filmography ==
=== Director ===
- Oye Makhna (2022)
- Nikka Zaildar 3 (2019)
- Muklawa (2019)
- Mar Gaye Oye Loko (2018)
- Subedar Joginder Singh (2018)
- Nikka Zaildar 2 (2017)
- Nikka Zaildar (2016)
- Angrej (2015)
- Baaz (2014)
- Daddy Cool Munde Fool (2013)
- Chak Jawana (2010)

=== Producer ===
- Television (2020)
- Parauhneya Nu Daffa Karo (2020)

=== Writer ===
- Chak Jawana (2010)

=== Assistant Director ===
- 2006 Waris Shah: Ishq Daa Waaris
- 2005 Blackmail
- 2003 Zameen
- 2000 Raju Chacha
- 1998 Pyaar To Hona Hi Tha

== Awards ==
PTC Punjabi Film Awards 2016

- PTC Punjabi Film Awards 2016 for Best Director For the Film Angrej (2015)
