= Oye Hoye Pyar Ho Gaya =

Oye Hoye Pyar Ho gaya
- Directed by: Aditya Sood
- Screenplay by: Aditya sood
- Story by: Aditya sood
- Produced by: Adityas films
- Starring: Sharry Mann; Jimmy Sharma; Niharika Kareer; Yograj Singh; Binnu Dhillon; Sardar Sohi; Rana Ranbir
- Music by: Gurmeet Singh
- Release date: 14 June 2013
- Country: India
- Language: Punjabi

Oye Hoye Pyar Ho Gaya is a 2013 Punjabi film directed by Aditya Sood starring Sharry Mann, Jimmy Sharma, and Niharika Kareer as the main cast of the film. I was scheduled for release on 14 June 2013. 'Oye Hoye Pyar Ho Gaya' is a story of two fun loving friends, Sharry (Sharry Mann) and Harry (Rana Ranbir). Sharry falls for Meet (Niharika Kareer), who is the daughter of Police Commissioner Shamsher Singh (Yograj Singh). Chamkila (Binnu Dhillon) who is also trying his chances on Meet gets envious of Sharry and tries tarnishing his image in front of Meet's family. Kartar, (Jimmy Sharma) son of the Police Commissioner and the elder brother of Meet is the main hurdle that Sharry has to pass in the story and the commissioner discusses everything with him before taking any decision.

== Cast ==
- Sharry Mann
- Jimmy Sharma
- Niharika Kareer
- Yograj Singh
- Binnu Dhillon
- Rana Ranbir
- Sardar Sohi
- Prakash gaidu
- Bhotu Shah
- Kake Shah

== Release ==
Oye Hoye Pyar Ho Gaya was theatrically released on 4 June 2013.

=== Home Media Release ===
The film is accessible for streaming on the Chaupal Ott platform.

== Reception ==
The Times of India gave the film a poor review, calling out issues with the directing, storyline and acting. The Tribune gave a mixed review, lamenting the film's story but called Mann's performance as a first time actor decent and highlighted the film's songs.
