= Gunjan Walia =

Indian model turned television actress

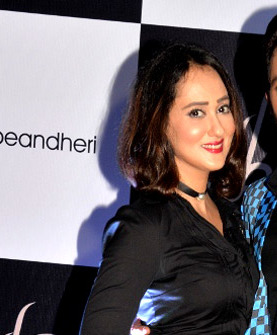
- Walia in 2017
- Occupation: Actress
- Years active: 2004–2019
- Spouses: Sachin Verma (m. 2008; div. 2009) Vikas Manaktala (m. 2015)

Gunjan Walia is an Indian model turned television actress. She is best known for her role Krishna in the serial Kuch Apne Kuch Paraye as the main female lead. She replaced Twinkle Bajpai as Lakshmi on Ghar Ki Lakshmi Betiyann as the female lead. She has also featured in a video album "Jeena Tera Bina" by Arun Dagan. She also appeared in Naagin.

== Personal life ==
She married Vikas Manaktala on 21 April 2015 in Chandigarh.

== Filmography ==
=== Television ===
Year	Show	Role	Notes
2004–2006	Kesar	Riya Maliya	
2005	Rooh		Episode 26/34
2006	Aisa Des Hai Mera	Kandy Deol / Kandy Ajit Singh Gill	
2006	Kyunki Saas Bhi Kabhi Bahu Thi	Mrs. Tushar Mehta	Cameo
2006	Sinndoor Tere Naam Ka	Naina	
2006–2007	Kuch Apne Kuch Paraye	Krishna Abhay Raichand	
2007	Parrivaar	Dr. Radha Swapnil Nerulkar	
2007–2008	Saat Phere: Saloni Ka Safar	Vrinda	
2008–2009	Ghar Ki Lakshmi Betiyann	Lakshmi Garodia / Lakshmi Karan Mathur	
2015–2016	Naagin	Chhaaya Viren Raheja	
2019	Laal Ishq	Sapna	Episode 61

=== Films ===
- 2010 Mar Jawan Gur Khake as Mehak
- 2013 Ishq Garaari
