= Nikka Zaildar 2 =

2017 film by Simerjit Singh

- Official film poster
- Directed by: Simerjit Singh
- Written by: Jagdeep Sidhu
- Produced by: Amneet Sher Singh
- Starring: Ammy Virk; Sonam Bajwa; Wamiqa Gabbi; Nirmal Rishi
- Cinematography: Akashdeep Pandey
- Edited by: Omkarnath Bhakri
- Music by: Gurmeet Singh
- Production company: Patiala Motion Pictures
- Release date: 22 September 2017
- Country: India
- Language: Punjabi
- Box office: ₹19.20 crore (US$2.3 million)

Nikka Zaildar 2 is a 2017 Punjabi romantic comedy film directed by Simerjit Singh, written by Jagdeep Sidhu and starring Ammy Virk, Sonam Bajwa, and Wamiqa Gabbi as the main lead roles and the film was released worldwide on 22 September 2017. The film is the second installment in the Nikka Zaildar franchise and serves as a spiritual sequel to the 2016 film Nikka Zaildar.

== Plot ==
Nikka is in love with Saawan but circumstances force him to marry Roop, his childhood friend. The story then follows towards his attempts to marry Saawan. Circumstances make the family believe that Roop can't conceive and his second marriage is arranged with Saawan. In the end he realizes that he is in love with Roop now.

== Cast ==
- Ammy Virk as Nikka
- Sonam Bajwa as Roop Kaur
- Wamiqa Gabbi as Saawan Kaur
- Nirmal Rishi as Nikka's Bebe (Deso Kaur)
- Sardar Sohi as Gurdit Singh- Nikka's grandfather
- Rana Ranbir as Boota- Nikka's chacha
- Rakhi Hundal as Mindo- Nikka's Chachi
- Gurmeet Saajan as Saudagar Chacha
- Gurpreet Bhangu as Roop's grandmother
- Sharry Mann as Wadha Subedaar- Varinder (special appearance)
- Prakash Gaadhu as Naajar
- Baninder Bunny as Chamkaur
- Gurinder Makna as Saawan's Fuffad
- Ansh Tejpal as Doctor
- Prince Kanwaljit Singh as Teacher
- Malkit Rauni as Sarpanch
- Parminder Gill as Roop's mother

== Reception ==
=== Reviews ===
It was reviewed by Santa Banta with the statement — "Though it was a good overall experience there are short-comings too. The climax could have been better. To control the length of the movie the climax was not treated in a proper way. But this can be ignored as rest of the performances are too good."

== Track listing ==
S. no.	Track	Singer	Lyrics	Music	Picturised on
1.	"Kali Jotta"	Ammy Virk	Harmanjeet	Gurmeet Singh	Ammy Virk and Sonam Bajwa
2.	"Gaani"	Ammy Virk and Tarannum Malik	Inder Pandori	Gurmeet Singh	Ammy Virk and Wamiqa Gabbi
3.	"Jatti Mili Jatt Nu"	Muhammad Sadiq and Ranjit Kaur	Janak Sharmila	Charanjit Ahuja	Ammy Virk, Sonam Bajwa and Wamiqa Gabbi
4.	"Teeyan"	Various singers	Traditional	Gurmeet Singh	
5.	"Mehandi"	Veet Baljit	Veet Baljit	Gurmeet Singh	Ammy Virk and Sonam Bajwa
6.	"Nikka Zaildar" 2 Title Track	Karamjit Anmol	Kuldeep Kandiara	Gurmeet Singh	

== Sequel ==
A Sequel Nikka Zaildar 3 was released on 20 September 2019.
