= Nikka Zaildar =

2016 film by Simerjit Singh

- Official film poster
- Directed by: Simerjit Singh
- Written by: Jagdeep Sidhu
- Produced by: TarandeepSingh
- Starring: Ammy Virk; Sonam Bajwa; Karamjit Anmol; Nirmal Rishi; Sonia Kaur; Sharry Mann
- Cinematography: Akashdeep Pandey
- Edited by: Omkarnath Bhakri
- Music by: Jatinder Shah
- Production companies: Patiala Motion Pictures; Simerjit Singh Production
- Distributed by: White Hill Studio
- Release date: 30 September 2016
- Country: India
- Language: Punjabi

Nikka Zaildar is a 2016 Punjabi romantic comedy film directed by Simerjit Singh, written by Jagdeep Sidhu, and starring Ammy Virk and Sonam Bajwa as the main lead roles and was released worldwide on 30 September 2016. It follows college student Nikka (Ammy Virk), who, while studying at Patiala College, falls in love with Manraj (Sonam Bajwa).

== Plot ==
Yadwinder aka Nikka is from a wealthy landlord family in rural Punjab and is a student at a college in Patiala. While there, he falls for Manraj but she refuses to engage romantically with him saying that she would only marry a guy that her family chooses for her. Nikka sends his friend Bhola as mediator to convince his and Manraj's family. As, Nikka is still studying so his grandmother refuses to entertain the notion of his marriage saying that he is young and not ready to marry. To convince her, Nikka quits college in the hope that the grandmother changes her mind but when she doesn't relent, he fools her into believing that he's having an affair with Shanti whom his grandmother disapproves of as a suitable match. Then, he sends Bhola again to convince her to consider Manraj who is from a far wealthier and reputed family. This time, the grandmother agrees and sends marriage proposal to Manraj's family. However, they fix his marriage with Manraj's older sister Seerat as they thought that the marriage proposal was for her. Nikka and Seerat are now engaged but neither of them likes each other and they want to break off the engagement but can't. Meanwhile, Nikka and Manraj fall in love when he convinces her that the marriage proposal was meant for her. Since they have no other option left, Nikka and Manraj elope which causes a comedy of errors at their houses. However, the couple has a last minute change of heart and return home which convinces their families to agree to their marriage instead.

== Cast ==
- Ammy Virk as Nikka/Yadwinder Singh
- Sonam Bajwa as Manraaj Kaur
- Karamjit Anmol as Bhola (Nikka's friend)
- Nirmal Rishi as Nikka's grandmother
- Sonia Kour as Seerat (Manraaj's sister)
- Gurmeet Saajan as Manraaj's Taaya
- Baninder Bunny as Gapp (Nikka's friend)
- Kishore Sharma as Nikka's grandfather
- Harby Sangha as Raama
- Sukhwinder Chahal as Nikka's father
- Parminder Gill as Nikka's mother
- Nisha Bano as Shanti (Nikka's neighbor)
- Ansh Tejpal as Toti
- Harpreet Kaler as Nikku
- Jashanjeet Gosha as Manraaj's brother
- Sharry Mann (special appearance) as himself

== Music ==
S. No.	Track	Singer	Music	Lyrics
1.	"Mini Cooper"	Ammy Virk	Jatinder Shah	Maninder Kailey
2.	"Lagdi Na Akh"	Ammy Virk	Jatinder Shah	Happy Raikoti
3.	"Nikka Zaildar"	Karamjit Anmol	Jatinder Shah	Kuldeep Kandiara
4.	"Bach Nayion Sakda"	Prabh Gill	Jatinder Shah	Maninder Kailey
5.	"Bolane Di Lodd Nahin"	Happy Raikoti	Jatinder Shah	Maninder Kailey
6.	"Wattan Uttey"	Ammy Virk	Jatinder Shah	Charan Likhari

== Sequel ==
A sequel, Nikka Zaildar 2, was released on September 22, 2017.
