= Rahe Chardi Kala Punjab Di =

- Directed by: Shapinder Saini
- Story by: Shapinder Saini
- Produced by: Jasvir Singh Sidhu, Bohra Bros Production Pvt Ltd / H.K. Movies
- Starring: Jimmy Sharma; Prabhleen Sandhu; Dakssh Ajit Singh; Sapna Thakur
- Music by: Surinder Bachan
- Release date: 25 May 2012
- Country: India
- Language: Punjabi

Rahe Chardi Kala Punjab Di is a 2012 Punjabi drama film starring Jimmy Sharma, Dakssh Ajit Singh Shakti Kapoor, Sharad Saxena, Prabhleen Sandhu, and Sapna Thakur. Directed and written by Shapinder Saini and produced by Jasvir Singh Sidhu, the film was released on 25 May 2012.

== Cast ==
- Jimmy Sharma as Saroop
- Prabhleen Sandhu as Zeba
- Dakssh Ajit Singh as Dalbir Singh
- Sapna Thakur
- Rupinder Rupi
- Shakti Kapoor as taari bhaji
- Sharat Saxena as minister

== Soundtrack ==
Song	Singer(s)
"Rahe Chardi Kala Punjab Di"	Sukhwinder Singh
"Sajna Tu Sasta Kyon Vikya"	Master Saleem
"Sanam Wahe Guru"	Harish Mohile
"Wade Akhan Sachiyan De"	Javed Ali and Jaspinder Narula
"Eko Takya Sahara"	Javed Ali
"Gidhe Vich Gedha Laja"	Shaan and Jaspinder Narula
