= Prabhleen Sandhu =

Indian Punjabi film actress

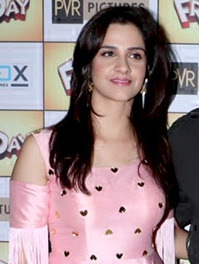
- Prabhleen Sandhu snapped at trailer launch of the film FryDay.
- Born: Firozpur, Punjab, India
- Occupation: actress
- Years active: 2005–present

Prabhleen Sandhu is an Indian Punjabi film actress who rose to fame with the Indian soap on periodic freedom struggles on Colors' Mohe Rang De as Kranti, and role in Zee's show, Aapki Antara as Vidya, a middle-class wife, who has trouble adjusting to her autistic child.

Her first film was Yaaran Naal Baharan, where she played Juhi Babbar's friend. She also acted in the Punjabi movie Mehndi Waley Hath, a 2004 Drama. She has also acted in the Punjabi movie Ek Jind Ek Jaan playing the sister of Aryan Vaid and Raj Babbar in the movie. In the film Not a Love Story, she played Anju, directed by Ram Gopal Verma and she also acted in the Punjabi film Rahe Chardi Kala Punjab Di. Her film Nabar (2013) won best Punjabi film at the 60th National Film Awards.

== Filmography ==
Year	Movie	Role	Language	Notes
2005	Yaaran Naal Baharan	Dolly	Punjabi	
2006	Ek Jind Ek Jaan	Guddi	Punjabi	
2006	Mehndi Waley Hath	Raavi	Punjabi	
2011	Rahe Chardi Kala Punjab Di	Zeba	Punjabi	
2011	Not a Love story	Anju	Hindi	
2013	Shahid	Mariam	Hindi	
2013	Sixteen	Deepti	Hindi	
2013	Nabar		Punjabi	
2013	Ishq Garaari		Punjabi	
2018	FryDay	Bela	Hindi	
2023	The Buckingham Murders	Preeti Sethi	Hindi/English	Film

=== Television ===
Year	Serial	Role	Notes
2008	Mohe Rang De	Kraanti	
2009	Aapki Antara	Vidya Verma	
