= List of highest-grossing fantasy films =

This article shows the lists of highest-grossing fantasy films of all time. It does not include horror films with fantasy elements, which are listed separately at the list of highest-grossing horror films.

== Highest-grossing fantasy films ==
The following is a list of the highest-grossing fantasy films of all time. The top 12 are among the highest-grossing films of all time. Superhero films and science fiction films often have some fantasy elements but are not included here, having their own separate lists.

Highest-grossing films
Rank	Film	Year	Worldwide gross	Ref
1	Ne Zha 2	2025	$2,217,758,382	
2	The Odyssey †	2026	$1,796,079,998	
3	Inside Out 2	2024	$1,698,863,816	
4	Frozen 2	2019	$1,450,026,933	
5	Barbie	2023	$1,447,038,421	
6	The Super Mario Bros. Movie	2023	$1,362,680,539	
7	Harry Potter and the Deathly Hallows – Part 2	2011	$1,342,321,665	
8	Frozen	2013	$1,290,000,000	^{F}
9	Beauty and the Beast	2017	$1,263,521,126	
10	The Lord of the Rings: The Return of the King	2003	$1,150,779,825	
11	Pirates of the Caribbean: Dead Man's Chest	2006	$1,066,179,725	
12	Moana 2	2024	$1,059,242,164	
13	Aladdin	2019	$1,050,693,953	
14	Pirates of the Caribbean: On Stranger Tides	2011	$1,045,713,802	
15	Alice in Wonderland	2010	$1,025,467,110	
16	The Hobbit: An Unexpected Journey	2012	$1,017,003,568	
17	The Super Mario Galaxy Movie	2026	$1,012,513,080	
18	Harry Potter and the Philosopher's Stone	2001	$1,009,046,830	
19	Harry Potter and the Deathly Hallows – Part 1	2010	$976,941,486	
20	The Jungle Book	2016	$967,724,775	
21	Jumanji: Welcome to the Jungle	2017	$962,544,585	
22	A Minecraft Movie	2025	$961,187,780	
23	Pirates of the Caribbean: At World's End	2007	$960,996,492	
24	The Hobbit: The Desolation of Smaug	2013	$959,027,992	
25	The Hobbit: The Battle of the Five Armies	2014	$956,019,788	
26	The Lord of the Rings: The Two Towers	2002	$947,495,095	
27	Harry Potter and the Order of the Phoenix	2007	$942,172,396	
28	Harry Potter and the Half-Blood Prince	2009	$934,454,096	
29	Shrek 2	2004	$919,838,758	
30	The Lord of the Rings: The Fellowship of the Ring	2001	$901,990,952	
31	Harry Potter and the Goblet of Fire	2005	$896,678,241	
32	Harry Potter and the Chamber of Secrets	2002	$879,602,366	
33	Inside Out	2015	$859,076,254	
34	The Twilight Saga: Breaking Dawn – Part 2	2012	$829,747,654	
35	Demon Slayer: Infinity Castle	2025	$820,400,000	
36	Fantastic Beasts and Where to Find Them	2016	$814,044,001	
37	Shrek the Third	2007	$813,367,380	
38	Coco	2017	$807,817,888	
39	Jumanji: The Next Level	2019	$800,059,707	
40	Harry Potter and the Prisoner of Azkaban	2004	$797,361,618	
41	Pirates of the Caribbean: Dead Men Tell No Tales	2017	$794,881,442	
42	Wicked	2024	$758,737,211	
43	Maleficent	2014	$758,411,779	
44	Shrek Forever After	2010	$752,600,867	
45	The Chronicles of Narnia: The Lion, the Witch and the Wardrobe	2005	$745,013,115	
46	Ne Zha	2019	$742,718,496	
47	The Twilight Saga: Breaking Dawn – Part 1	2011	$712,171,856	
48	The Twilight Saga: New Moon	2009	$709,827,462	
49	The Twilight Saga: Eclipse	2010	$698,491,347	
50	Fantastic Beasts: The Crimes of Grindelwald	2018	$654,855,901	

^{F}Box Office Mojo stopped updating its main total for Frozen in August 2014, while it was still in release. The total listed here incorporates subsequent earnings in Japan, Nigeria, Spain, the United Kingdom and Germany up to the end of 2015 but omits earnings in Turkey, Iceland, Brazil, and Australia (2016), which amount to a few hundred thousand dollars. The total is rounded to $1 million to compensate for the numerical inaccuracy. It was re-released in the United Kingdom in December 2017 with Olaf's Frozen Adventure earning an additional $2.3 million.

== Box office ticket sales ==
The following is a list of fantasy films that sold more than 30 million tickets at the worldwide box office.

Film	Year	Tickets (est.)	Territories included (Note: Box office territories for which the film's ticket sales data are currently known)	Ref
Legend of the White Snake (Bai she zhuan)	1980	700,000,000	China	
Ne Zha 2	2025	327,804,962	China, Americas, Europe, Russia, SK	(Note: Ne Zha 2 admissions: China – 325,000,000; United States – 2,062,000; Russia – 171,400; France – 62,375; Other European countries – 423,584; South Korea – 66,134; Brazil – 19,469)
The Jungle Book	1967	264,936,054	Worldwide	(Note: The Jungle Book (1967) admissions: United States and United Kingdom – 220,500,000; Germany – 27,300,000; France, Sweden, Argentina, Spain, Denmark, Austria, Italy, Finland – 17,136,054)
The Ten Commandments	1956	262,000,000	Worldwide	
Frozen 2	2019	223,100,000	Worldwide	
Snow White and the Seven Dwarfs	1937	218,491,031	Worldwide	(Note: Snow White and the Seven Dwarfs: United States – 166,387,000; United Kingdom – 28,000,000; France – 18,353,225; Germany – 4,201,480; Italy – 1,330,316; European re-releases (2001–2022) – 218,888; South Korea – 122)
The Jungle Book	2016	193,700,000	Worldwide	
Jumanji: Welcome to the Jungle	2017	188,400,000	Worldwide	
Fantasia	1940	182,128,748	United States and France	
The Super Mario Bros. Movie	2023	168,100,000	Worldwide	
Harry Potter and the Philosopher's Stone	2001	164,512,878	Worldwide	(Note: Harry Potter and the Philosopher's Stone: Bulgaria, Cyprus, Czech Republic, Estonia, Finland, Iceland, Ireland, Latvia, Lithuania, Luxembourg, Netherlands, Norway, Poland, Portugal, Romania, Russia, Slovakia, Slovenia, Switzerland, United States and Canada – 69,490,876; United Kingdom – 17,560,000; Japan – 16,249,000; Australia, Brazil (before 2021), South Korea, Turkey – 14,605,597; Germany – 12,670,805; France – 9,608,331; Spain – 6,453,218; Italy – 6,066,711; China – 5,364,225; Austria, Belgium, Denmark, Sweden – 4,783,844; Hungary – 1,034,441; Brazil (re-release in 2021) – 368,830; Mexico – 257,000)
Aladdin	2019	161,600,000	Worldwide	
Inside Out 2	2024	161,300,000	Worldwide	
Pirates of the Caribbean: Dead Men Tell No Tales	2017	155,600,000	Worldwide	
Barbie	2023	152,200,000	Worldwide	
Baahubali 2: The Conclusion	2017	150,000,000	Worldwide	
The Lord of the Rings: The Return of the King	2003	149,735,814	Worldwide	(Note: The Lord of the Rings: The Return of the King: United States and Canada – 62,628,487; Australia, Austria, Belgium, Japan, Poland, Sweden – 19,020,298; United Kingdom – 15,220,000; Germany – 10,507,981; Argentina, Brazil, Chile, Denmark – 8,369,156; France – 7,404,926; Spain – 6,902,600; Bulgaria, Cyprus, Czech Republic, Estonia, Finland, Hungary, Iceland, Ireland, Latvia, Lithuania, Luxembourg, Netherlands, Portugal, Romania, Slovakia, Slovenia, Turkey – 6,506,258; South Korea – 5,990,349; Italy – 4,333,601; Norway – 1,015,608; Switzerland – 920,076; China – 777,986; Russia – 138,488)
Frozen	2013	142,925,342	Worldwide	(Note: Frozen: Austria, Belgium, Bulgaria, Croatia, Cyprus, Czech Republic, Estonia, Finland, Germany, Greece, Hungary, Iceland, Ireland, Italy, Latvia, Lithuania, Luxembourg, Montenegro, Netherlands, North Macedonia, Poland, Portugal, Russia, Slovenia, Spain, Sweden, Switzerland, Turkey, United Kingdom, United States and Canada – 81,195,156; Japan, Norway, South Korea – 30,841,405; Bolivia, China, Denmark, Mexico, Paraguay, Romania, Slovakia, Ukraine, Uruguay – 17,232,610; Argentina, Brazil, Chile, Colombia – 8,504,316; France – 5,151,855)
The Lord of the Rings: The Fellowship of the Ring	2001	142,597,767	Worldwide	(Note: The Lord of the Rings: The Fellowship of the Ring: Bulgaria, Cyprus, Czech Republic, Estonia, Finland, Hungary, Iceland, Ireland, Italy, Latvia, Lithuania, Luxembourg, Netherlands, Norway, Poland, Romania, Slovakia, Slovenia, Turkey, United States and Canada – 71,361,706; United Kingdom – 15,980,000; Brazil, Chile, Japan, South Korea – 15,740,324; Germany – 11,995,534; Australia, Austria, Belgium, Denmark, Sweden, Switzerland – 11,759,536; Spain – 7,146,859; France – 6,992,901; China – 1,403,290; Russia – 217,617)
Ne Zha	2019	140,020,454	China, United Kingdom, Ireland	
The Lord of the Rings: The Two Towers	2002	139,804,845	Worldwide	(Note: The Lord of the Rings: The Two Towers: United States and Canada – 58,911,205; Austria, Bulgaria, Cyprus, Czech Republic, Estonia, Finland, Germany, Greece, Hungary, Iceland, Ireland, Italy, Latvia, Lithuania, Luxembourg, Netherlands, Poland, Romania, Slovakia, Slovenia, Turkey – 24,599,566; United Kingdom – 14,400,000; Australia, Belgium, Denmark, Norway, Sweden, Switzerland – 10,978,015; Brazil, Japan, Portugal – 10,765,939; France – 7,110,078; Spain – 6,522,547; South Korea – 5,210,440; China – 1,155,917; Russia – 151,138)
Harry Potter and the Deathly Hallows – Part 2	2011	137,832,956	Worldwide	(Note: Harry Potter and the Deathly Hallows – Part 2: Austria, Belgium, Bosnia and Herzegovina, Bulgaria, Croatia, Czech Republic, Estonia, Finland, Greece, Iceland, Ireland, Latvia, Lithuania, Luxembourg, Netherlands, Poland, Portugal, Romania, Slovakia, Slovenia, Spain, Turkey, United Kingdom, United States and Canada – 71,151,347; Australia, Chile, China, Hong Kong, Japan, Mexico, Sweden, Ukraine – 32,209,845; Denmark, Germany, Hungary, Norway – 8,233,518; France – 6,561,608; Brazil – 5,577,927; Russia – 4,615,286; South Korea – 4,421,210; Italy – 2,722,416; Argentina – 1,823,869; Switzerland – 515,930)
Pirates of the Caribbean: Dead Man's Chest	2006	134,528,334	Americas, Europe, Japan, Korea	(Note: Pirates of the Caribbean: Dead Man's Chest: United States and Canada – 64,628,400; Europe (excluding Russia) – 45,005,547; Australia, Brazil, Japan, Russia, South Korea – 24,894,387)
Moana	2016	128,800,000	Worldwide	
Beauty and the Beast	2017	124,368,330	Americas, Europe, Morocco, Asia	(Note: Beauty and the Beast (2017) admissions: United States and Canada – 56,798,200; Europe and Morocco – 33,919,225; China – 15,841,104; Japan – 9.5 million; Brazil - 8,309,801; South Korea – 5,138,330)
Shrek 2	2004	123,023,527	Americas, Europe, South Korea	(Note: Shrek 2: United States and Canada – 71,050,900; Europe (excluding Russia) – 44,617,071; Argentina, Australia, Brazil, Chile, Russia, South Korea – 7,355,556)
Jumanji: The Next Level	2019	122,600,000	Worldwide	
Moana 2	2024	100,600,000	Worldwide	
Demon Slayer: Infinity Castle	2025	98,520,310	Worldwide	
The Odyssey †	2026	93,900,000	Worldwide	
The Mermaid	2016	92,766,699	China, United States, South Korea	
Aladdin	1992	90,290,784	USA, Canada, Europe, Asia, Australia	(Note: Aladdin (1992) admissions: United States and Canada – 52,442,300; France, Germany, Italy, Spain – 21,074,285; United Kingdom – 8,300,000; Japan – 4,550,835; Australia – 2,753,072; South Korea (Seoul City) – 647,266; Denmark – 522,350; Finland and Switzerland (1996–2015) – 676)
The Super Mario Galaxy Movie †	2026	87,356,214	Worldwide	(Note: The Super Mario Galaxy Movie admissions: United States – 37,762,000; Japan – 4,947,393; Brazil, China, France, Germany, Italy, Russia, Spain – 21,564,771; Mexico – 14,810,000; United Kingdom – 4,700,000; South Korea – 1,606,328; Argentina – 1,159,454; United Arab Emirates – 353,188; Czech Republic – 195,858; Greece – 164,368; Hungary – 140,369; Finland – 136,106; Bulgaria – 90,982; Slovakia – 78,585)
The 7th Voyage of Sinbad	1958	84,955,546	United States, Soviet Union, France	(Note: See The 7th Voyage of Sinbad § Box office)
A Minecraft Movie	2025	82,600,000	Worldwide	
Inside Out	2015	77,600,000	Worldwide	
Life of Pi	2012	71,600,000	Worldwide	
Pokémon: Detective Pikachu	2019	66,600,000	Worldwide	
The Mummy Returns	2001	59,593,152	Worldwide	
Pirates of the Caribbean: The Curse of the Black Pearl	2003	56,900,000	United States and United Kingdom	
The Mummy	1999	56,775,420	Worldwide	
Pirates of the Caribbean: At Worlds End	2007	53,100,000	United States and United Kingdom	
Night at the Museum	2006	52,700,000	Worldwide	
Night at the Museum: Battle of the Smithsonian	2009	50,700,000	Worldwide	
Baahubali: The Beginning	2015	49,000,000	India	
Journey to the West: The Demons Strike Back	2017	48,300,000	Worldwide	
The Thief of Bagdad	1940	43,000,000	USA, Canada, France, Soviet Union	(Note: See The Thief of Bagdad (1940 film) § Box office)
The Mummy: Tomb of the Dragon Emperor	2008	40,040,712	Worldwide	
Night at the Museum: Secret of the Tomb	2014	39,200,000	Worldwide	
Jumanji	1995	37,317,735	United States, Europe, South Korea	(Note: Jumanji (1995) admissions: United States and United Kingdom – 27,200,000; Germany – 2,600,000; France – 2,034,972; Other European countries – 4,942,361; South Korea (Seoul City) – 540,402)
Pirates of the Caribbean: On Stranger Tides	2011	36,500,000	United States and United Kingdom	
Madhumati	1958	32,500,000	India	

== Biggest worldwide openings ==
This list charts films the biggest worldwide openings. Since films do not open on Fridays in many markets, the 'opening' is taken to be the gross between the first day of release and the first Sunday following the movie's release. Figures prior to the year 2002 are not available.

Since many American films do not open in all markets at the same time, the 'opening' gross varies depending on when it was released in the US-Canada market. For example, for films like Harry Potter and the Deathly Hallows – Part 2 which opened in the US-Canada market and in most other major markets during the same weekend, the 'opening' is the total gross of the film during that weekend. On the other hand, for films which opened in several markets a week ahead of their respective releases in the US-Canada market, the 'opening' is the sum of the opening grosses in the markets where they were released first and the opening in the US-Canada market. In the latter case, the opening grosses from territories after the initial overseas opening are not included in the 'opening' of the film. In all cases, if a film opens in a market after its release in the US-Canada market, that opening is not included in the 'opening' of the film.

Films must open to over $200 million.

Rank	Film	Year	Opening	Ref
1	Harry Potter and the Deathly Hallows – Part 2	2011	$483,189,427	
2	Ne Zha 2	2025	$431,280,000	
3	Harry Potter and the Half-Blood Prince	2009	$394,022,354	
4	The Super Mario Bros. Movie	2023	$377,200,000	
5	Frozen 2	2019	$358,503,293	
6	Beauty and the Beast	2017	$357,026,593	
7	Barbie	2023	$356,322,044	
8	Pirates of the Caribbean: On Stranger Tides	2011	$350,653,677	
9	Pirates of the Caribbean: At World's End	2007	$343,972,864	
10	The Twilight Saga: Breaking Dawn – Part 2	2012	$340,667,634	
11	Harry Potter and the Order of the Phoenix	2007	$332,715,157	
12	Harry Potter and the Deathly Hallows – Part 1	2010	$330,017,372	
13	A Minecraft Movie	2025	$313,453,003	
14	Inside Out 2	2024	$295,000,000	
15	The Twilight Saga: Breaking Dawn – Part 1	2011	$291,022,261	
16	The Twilight Saga: New Moon	2009	$274,939,137	
17	The Mermaid	2016	$274,049,983	
18	Pirates of the Caribbean: Dead Men Tell No Tales	2017	$271,809,637	
19	The Odyssey	2026	$263,799,900	
20	Fantastic Beasts: The Crimes of Grindelwald	2018	$253,663,104	
21	The Lord of the Rings: The Return of the King	2003	$250,000,534	
22	The Twilight Saga: Eclipse	2010	$228,893,465	
23	Wicked: For Good	2025	$223,041,640	
24	The Hobbit: An Unexpected Journey	2012	$222,617,303	
25	Fantastic Beasts and Where to Find Them	2016	$219,903,387	
26	Aladdin	2019	$214,700,000	
27	Alice in Wonderland	2010	$210,101,023	
28	The Hobbit: The Desolation of Smaug	2013	$209,845,197	
29	Harry Potter and the Prisoner of Azkaban	2004	$207,200,000	

== Timeline of highest-grossing films ==
The following is a timeline of highest-grossing fantasy films of all time.

Timeline of the highest-grossing film records
Year	Title	Record-setting gross	Ref
1924	The Thief of Bagdad	$3,000,000	
1938	Snow White and the Seven Dwarfs	$8,000,000	
1940	Snow White and the Seven Dwarfs	$8,500,000	
1944	The Thief of Bagdad	$11,500,000	
1946	The Thief of Bagdad	$13,000,000	
1958	The 7th Voyage of Sinbad	$29,400,000	
1965	Fantasia	$42,853,563	
1965	Mary Poppins	$44,000,000	
1966	Mary Poppins	$50,000,000	
1967	The Jungle Book	$378,000,000	
1992	Aladdin	$504,050,219	
2001	Harry Potter and the Philosopher's Stone	$974,755,371	
2004	The Lord of the Rings: The Return of the King	$1,140,682,011	
2005	The Lord of the Rings: The Return of the King	$1,141,093,340^{‡}	
2011	The Lord of the Rings: The Return of the King	$1,141,911,920^{‡}	
2011	Harry Potter and the Deathly Hallows – Part 2	$1,341,511,219	
2016	Harry Potter and the Deathly Hallows – Part 2	$1,341,836,224^{‡}	
2018	Harry Potter and the Deathly Hallows – Part 2	$1,342,028,110^{‡}	
2019	Frozen 2	$1,450,026,933	
2024	Inside Out 2	$1,698,863,816	
2025	Ne Zha 2	$2,217,758,382	

^{‡}Includes revenue from re-releases. If a film increased its gross through re-releases while holding the record, the year in which it recorded its highest gross is also noted in italics.

== Highest-grossing films by year ==
Highest-grossing films by year of release
Year	Title	Worldwide gross	Budget	Ref
1924	The Thief of Bagdad	$3,000,000	$1,135,654	
1937	Snow White and the Seven Dwarfs	$418,200,000	$1,499,000	
1940	Fantasia	$83,320,832	$2,280,000	
1954	Nagin	$6,000,000	?	
1958	The 7th Voyage of Sinbad	$29,400,000	$650,000	
1964	Mary Poppins	$103,128,676	$4,400,000	
1967	The Jungle Book	$378,000,000	$4,000,000	
1991	Beauty and the Beast	$331,907,151	$25,000,000	
1992	Aladdin	$504,050,219	$28,000,000	
1995	Jumanji	$262,821,940	$65,000,000	
1998	Pokémon: The First Movie	$172,744,662	$5,000,000	
1999	The Mummy	$418,373,805	$80,000,000	
2000	Pokémon 3: The Movie	$68,411,275	$16,000,000	
2001	Harry Potter and the Philosopher's Stone	$1,009,046,830 ($974,755,371)	$125,000,000	
2002	The Lord of the Rings: The Two Towers	$947,495,095 ($936,689,735)	$94,000,000	
2003	The Lord of the Rings: The Return of the King	$1,150,779,825 ($1,140,692,011)	$94,000,000	
2004	Shrek 2	$919,838,758	$150,000,000	
2005	Harry Potter and the Goblet of Fire	$896,346,413 ($895,921,036)	$150,000,000	
2006	Pirates of the Caribbean: Dead Man's Chest	$1,066,179,725	$225,000,000	
2007	Pirates of the Caribbean: At World's End	$963,420,425	$300,000,000	
2008	The Chronicles of Narnia: Prince Caspian	$419,665,568	$225,000,000	
2009	Harry Potter and the Half-Blood Prince	$934,454,096 ($933,959,197)	$250,000,000	
2010	Alice in Wonderland	$1,025,468,216($1,025,467,110)	$200,000,000	
2011	Harry Potter and the Deathly Hallows – Part 2	$1,342,321,665 ($1,341,511,219)	$125,000,000	
2012	The Hobbit: An Unexpected Journey	$1,017,003,568	$200,000,000	
2013	Frozen	$1,290,000,000 ($1,287,000,000)	$150,000,000	
2014	The Hobbit: The Battle of the Five Armies	$956,019,788	$209,000,000	
2015	Cinderella	$542,358,331 ($542,351,353)	$84,210,000	
2016	The Jungle Book	$966,554,929 ($966,550,600)	$175,000,000	
2017	Beauty and the Beast	$1,264,434,525 ($1,263,521,126)	$255,000,000	
2018	Fantastic Beasts: The Crimes of Grindelwald	$654,855,901	$200,000,000	
2019	Frozen 2	$1,450,026,933	$150,000,000	
2020	Demon Slayer the Movie: Mugen Train	$512,704,063 ($507,119,058)	$15,850,000	
2021	A Writer's Odyssey	$159,848,488	?	
2022	Fantastic Beasts: The Secrets of Dumbledore	$407,150,844	$200,000,000	
2023	Barbie	$1,447,038,421	$145,000,000	
2024	Inside Out 2	$1,698,863,816	$200,000,000	
2025	Ne Zha 2	$2,217,758,382	$80,000,000	
2026	The Odyssey †	$1,796,079,998	$250,000,000	

(...) Since grosses are not limited to original theatrical runs, a film's first-run gross is included in brackets after the total if known.

^{TBA}To be ascertained.

== Highest-grossing film franchises ==
The following is a list of the highest-grossing fantasy film series & franchises of all time. The top 6 are along the highest grossing film series and franchises of all time. The Wizarding World has the highest gross with a total gross of $9.6 billion, while Frozen has the highest average with $1.4 billion.

Highest-grossing fantasy film series & franchises(The films in each series can be viewed by selecting "show".)

Rank	Series	Total worldwide gross	No. of films	Average of films	Highest-grossing film

1
Wizarding World
$9,652,545,292
11
$877,504,117
Harry Potter and the Deathly Hallows – Part 2 ($1,342,321,665)

	Harry Potter series	$7,776,500,039	8	$972,062,505	Deathly Hallows – Part 2 ($1,342,321,665)
1	Deathly Hallows – Part 2 (2011)	$1,342,321,665			
2	Philosopher's Stone (2001)	$1,006,968,171			
3	Deathly Hallows – Part 1 (2010)	$976,941,486			
4	Order of the Phoenix (2007)	$942,172,396			
5	Half-Blood Prince (2009)	$934,454,096			
6	Goblet of Fire (2005)	$896,678,241			
7	Chamber of Secrets (2002)	$879,602,366			
8	Prisoner of Azkaban (2004)	$797,361,618			

	Fantastic Beasts series	$1,876,045,253	3	$625,348,418	Where to Find Them ($814,038,508)
1	Where to Find Them (2016)	$814,038,508			
2	The Crimes of Grindelwald (2018)	$654,855,901			
3	The Secrets of Dumbledore (2022)	$407,150,844			

2	Middle-earth	$5,978,900,075	8	$747,362,509	The Lord of the Rings: The Return of the King ($1,147,997,407)
Jackson series $5,931,012,279 6 $988,502,047 The Lord of the Rings: The Return of the King ($1,147,997,407): / The Lord of the Rings / $2,998,933,848 / 3 / $999,644,616 / The Return of the King ($1,147,997,407); 1 / The Return of the King (2003) / $1,147,997,407; 2 / The Two Towers (2002) / $948,945,489; 3 / The Fellowship of the Ring (2001) / $901,990,952; / The Hobbit / $2,932,078,431 / 3 / $977,359,477 / An Unexpected Journey ($1,017,030,651); 1 / An Unexpected Journey (2012) / $1,017,030,651; 2 / The Desolation of Smaug (2013) / $959,027,992; 3 / The Battle of the Five Armies (2014) / $956,019,788
The Lord of the Rings (1978) / $30,471,420
The War of the Rohirrim (2024) † / $20,658,572

3	Pirates of the Caribbean	$4,524,439,761	5	$904,887,952	Dead Man's Chest ($1,066,179,725)
1	Dead Man's Chest (2006)	$1,066,179,725			
2	On Stranger Tides (2011)	$1,045,713,802			
3	At World's End (2007)	$963,420,425			
4	Dead Men Tell No Tales (2017)	$794,861,794			
5	The Curse of the Black Pearl (2003)	$654,264,015			

4
Shrek
$4,022,435,758
6
$670,405,960
Shrek 2 ($928,760,770)

	Main series	$2,983,080,337	4	$745,770,084	Shrek 2 ($928,760,770)
1	Shrek 2 (2004)	$928,760,770			
2	The Third (2007)	$813,367,380			
3	Forever After (2010)	$752,600,867			
4	Shrek (2001)	$488,351,320			

	Puss in Boots series	$1,039,629,639	2	$519,814,820	Puss in Boots ($554,987,477)
1	Puss in Boots (2011)	$554,987,477			
2	The Last Wish (2022)	$484,642,162			

5	The Twilight Saga	$3,346,157,056	5	$669,231,411	Breaking Dawn – Part 2 ($829,746,820)
1	Breaking Dawn – Part 2 (2012)	$829,746,820			
2	Breaking Dawn – Part 1 (2011)	$712,205,856			
3	New Moon (2009)	$709,711,008			
4	Eclipse (2010)	$698,491,347			
5	Twilight (2008)	$393,616,788			
6	Twilight / New Moon Combo (2010)	$2,385,237			

6
Fengshen Cinematic Universe
$3,204,115,556
3
$1,068,038,519
Ne Zha 2 ($2,217,758,382)

	Ne Zha series	$2,960,272,451	2	$1,480,136,226	Ne Zha 2 ($2,217,758,382)
1	Ne Zha 2 (2025)	$2,217,758,382			
2	Ne Zha (2019)	$742,514,069			

Jiang Ziya: Legend of Deification (2020)	$243,843,105

7	Frozen	$2,740,026,933	2	$1,370,013,467	Frozen II ($1,450,026,933)
1	Frozen II (2019)	$1,450,026,933			
2	Frozen (2013)	$1,290,000,000			

8	Inside Out	$2,557,940,070	2	$1,278,970,035	Inside Out 2 ($1,698,863,816)
1	Inside Out 2 (2024)	$1,698,863,816			
2	Inside Out (2015)	$859,076,254			

9
Super Mario
$2,413,475,353
3
$804,491,784
The Super Mario Bros. Movie ($1,361,992,475)

	Animated series	$2,374,505,555	2	$1,187,252,778	The Super Mario Bros. Movie ($1,361,992,475)
1	The Super Mario Bros. Movie (2023)	$1,361,992,475			
2	The Super Mario Galaxy Movie (2026)	$1,012,513,080			

Super Mario Bros. (1993)	$38,912,465

10
How to Train Your Dragon
$2,274,805,813
4
$568,701,453
How to Train Your Dragon (2025) ($636,590,030)

	Animated series	$1,638,215,783	3	$546,071,928	How to Train Your Dragon 2 ($621,537,519)
1	How to Train Your Dragon 2 (2014)	$621,537,519			
2	The Hidden World (2019)	$521,799,505			
3	How to Train Your Dragon (2010)	$494,878,759			

	Live Action series	$636,590,030	1	$636,590,030	How to Train Your Dragon (2025) ($636,590,030)
1	How to Train Your Dragon (2025)	$636,590,030			

11	Jumanji	$2,090,505,336	4	$522,626,334	Welcome to the Jungle ($962,544,585)
1	Welcome to the Jungle (2017)	$962,544,585			
2	The Next Level (2019)	$800,059,707			
3	Jumanji (1995)	$262,821,940			
4	Zathura (2005)	$65,079,104			

12
Moana
$2,026,453,829
3
$675,484,610
Moana 2 ($1,059,242,164)

	Animated series	$1,702,574,631	2	$851,287,316	Moana 2 ($1,059,242,164)
1	Moana 2 (2024)	$1,059,242,164			
2	Moana (2016)	$643,332,467			

Moana (2026)	$323,879,198

13	Beauty and the Beast	$1,688,488,746	2	$844,244,373	Beauty and the Beast ($1,263,521,126)
1	Beauty and the Beast (2017)	$1,263,521,126			
2	Beauty and the Beast (1991)	$424,967,620			

14	The Chronicles of Narnia	$1,580,364,900	3	$526,788,300	The Lion, the Witch and the Wardrobe ($745,013,115)
1	The Lion, the Witch and the Wardrobe (2005)	$745,013,115			
2	Prince Caspian (2008)	$419,665,568			
3	The Voyage of the Dawn Treader (2010)	$415,686,217			

15	Aladdin	$1,554,744,172	2	$777,372,086	Aladdin (2019) ($1,050,693,953)
1	Aladdin (2019)	$1,050,693,953			
2	Aladdin (1992)	$504,050,219			

16	Pokémon	$1,507,766,458	24	$62,823,602	Detective Pikachu ($433,305,346)
Detective Pikachu (2019) / $433,305,346
/ Original series / $423,996,689 / 5 / $84,799,338 / The First Movie ($172,744,662); 1 / The First Movie (1998) / $172,744,662; 2 / The Movie 2000 (1999) / $133,949,270; 3 / 3: The Movie (2000) / $68,411,275; 4 / 4Ever (2001) / $28,023,563; 5 / Heroes (2002) / $20,867,919
/ Diamond & Pearl / $207,651,955 / 4 / $51,912,989 / Zoroark: Master of Illusions ($71,143,529); 1 / Zoroark Master of Illusions (2010) / $71,143,529; 2 / Arceus and the Jewel of Life (2009) / $50,673,078; 3 / Giratina and the Sky Warrior (2008) / $43,338,599; 4 / The Rise of Darkrai (2007) / $42,496,749
/ Best Wishes! / $135,384,123 / 3 / $45,128,041 / Black—Victini and Reshiram and White—Victini and Zekrom ($57,082,491); 1 / Black—Victini and Reshiram and White—Victini and Zekrom (2011) / $57,082,491; 2 / Kyurem vs. the Sword of Justice (2012) / $46,008,255; 3 / Genesect and the Legend Awakened (2013) / $32,293,377
/ Advanced Generation / $132,598,260 / 4 / $33,149,565 / Lucario and the Mystery of Mew ($37,228,626); 1 / Lucario and the Mystery of Mew (2005) / $37,228,626; 2 / Destiny Deoxys (2004) / $34,337,258; 3 / Jirachi Wish Maker (2003) / $33,393,751; 4 / Ranger and the Temple of the Sea (2006) / $27,638,625
/ Alternate continuity / $104,692,106 / 4 / $26,173,027 / I Choose You! ($37,552,144); 1 / I Choose You! (2017) / $37,552,144; 2 / Mewtwo Strikes Back: Evolution (2019) / $27,347,118; 3 / The Power of Us (2018) / $23,740,788; 4 / Secrets of the Jungle (2020) / $16,052,056
/ XY / $70,137,979 / 3 / $23,379,326 / Diancie and the Cocoon of Destruction ($28,595,105); 1 / Diancie and the Cocoon of Destruction (2014) / $28,595,105; 2 / Hoopa and the Clash of Ages (2015) / $21,815,482; 3 / Volcanion and the Mechanical Marvel (2016) / $19,727,392

17
Barbie
$1,449,597,548
5
$289,919,510
Barbie ($1,445,638,421)

Barbie (2023)	$1,445,638,421

	Animated films	$4,121,590	4	$1,030,398	the Secret Door ($1,986,375)
1	The Secret Door (2014)	$1,986,375			
2	Princess Power (2015)	$1,276,765			
3	Mermaid Power (2022)	$162,463			
4	Dolphin Magic (2017)	$695,987			

18	Demon Slayer: Kimetsu no Yaiba	$1,423,111,543	4	$355,777,886	Infinity Castle ($800,413,549)
1	Infinity Castle (2025)	$800,413,549			
2	Mugen Train (2020)	$512,704,063			
3	To the Swordsmith Village (2023)	$59,554,259			
4	To the Hashira Training (2024)	$50,439,672			

19	Night at the Museum	$1,350,791,646	3	$450,263,882	Night at the Museum ($574,480,841)
1	Night at the Museum (2006)	$574,480,841			
2	Battle of the Smithsonian (2009)	$413,106,170			
3	Secret of the Tomb (2014)	$363,204,635			

20
Alice in Wonderland
$1,328,787,908
3
$442,929,303
Alice in Wonderland (2010) ($1,025,467,110)

	Live action series	$1,325,287,908	2	$662,643,954	Alice in Wonderland (2010) ($1,025,467,110)
1	Alice in Wonderland (2010)	$1,025,467,110			
2	Through the Looking Glass (2016)	$299,820,798			

Alice in Wonderland (1951)	$3,500,000

== See also ==
- Lists of highest-grossing films
  - List of highest-grossing films
- Lists of fantasy films
