= Ishq Garaari =

- Directed by: Dheeraj Rattan
- Written by: Dheeraj Rattan
- Produced by: Ravi Jain, Karan Bali, Abhay Jain
- Starring: Sharry Mann; Rannvijay Singh; Gulzar Chahal; Vinaypal Buttar; Mandy Takhar; Miss Pooja; Gunjan Walia; Prabhleen Sandhu
- Music by: RDB; Yo Yo Honey Singh; Pav Dharia; Nick Dhammu; Badshah
- Distributed by: White Hill Studios
- Release date: 25 October 2013
- Country: India
- Language: Punjabi

Ishq Garaari is a Punjabi film directed by Dheeraj Rattan. It is produced by Ravi Jain and Karan Bali and stars Sharry Mann, Rannvijay Singh, Mandy Takhar, Gulzar Chahal, Miss Pooja, Vinaypal Buttar, Gunjan Walia, and Prabhleen Sandhu. The film also has a song titled 'Khalaara' by Yo Yo Honey Singh...

== Plot ==
The story is about Sharry who loves Priti and wants to marry her but her father who is doing tempo business is against it. Sharry aspires to become a singer. Later, her father puts forth a condition to Sharry wherein he has to arrange INR 70 lakhs to win her hand in marriage. Sharry kidnaps a girl Sweety thinking her to be daughter of Makhan owner of tempo business and seeks INR 70 lacs as ransom but discovers that they have kidnapped the wrong girl. Then there is a parallel story of Priti and Sweety who are daughters of tempo owner.

== Cast ==
- Sharry Mann
- Mandy Takhar
- Gulzar Chahal
- Rannvijay Singh
- Vinaypal Buttar
- Miss Pooja
- Mukesh Vohra
- Gunjan Walia
- Prabhleen Sandhu
