= Mohe Rang De =

- Genre: Drama; Romance
- Created by: Sphere Origins
- Directed by: Deepti Bhatagnar
- Creative director: Nimisha Pandey
- Starring: See below
- Theme music composer: Anand Raj Anand
- Opening theme: Anand Raj Anand
- Country of origin: India
- Original language: Hindi
- No. of seasons: 1
- No. of episodes: 165

Production
- Producers: Sunjoy Waddhawa; Deepti Bhatnagar
- Cinematography: Sanjay Malwankar
- Camera setup: Multi-camera
- Running time: Approx. 24 minutes
- Production companies: Deepti Bhatnagar Productions; Sphere Origins

Original release
- Network: Colors TV
- Release: 21 July 2008 – 6 March 2009

Mohe Rang De (transl. Color or paint me) is an Indian television series which aired on Colors TV on 21 July 2008 until 6 March 2009 and was produced by Sphere Origins.

== Plot ==
This soap opera is set around the early times where traditions were old fashioned. It tells the story of two individuals with different ideologies, Rajveer and Kranti. A period drama set in British Raj Punjab with the backdrop of 1942 during the Quit India Movement, the show witnesses the upheaval of a country, trying to achieve its freedom. The two meet and their lives take a new course.

Rajveer, the son of a trader was born with a silver spoon in his mouth who flourished because of his contacts with the British. He studied in England for almost 15 years and has returned to India to practise law. Kranti is a survivor who lost her family when she was just six months and has survived a massacre. Outside the house, she is a fiery, spirited, young woman, with firm beliefs that she is outspoken about, but a quiet, dutiful niece in her uncle’s house. After returning to India, Rajveer works for the British government but he has no idea that he was being used and brainwashed by the British against his own country. When he gets to know about the truth he decides to revolt. He changes his whole life to be with this woman whom he comes to love and Kranti finally finds her family.

== Cast and characters ==
- Gavie Chahal as Raajveer
- Prabhleen Sandhu as Kraanti
- Rinku Ghosh
- Yograaj Singh
- Arjun Bijlani as Aalekh
- Shubhi Ahuja as Lovely
