= Sharry Mann =

Indian singer and film actor (1982)

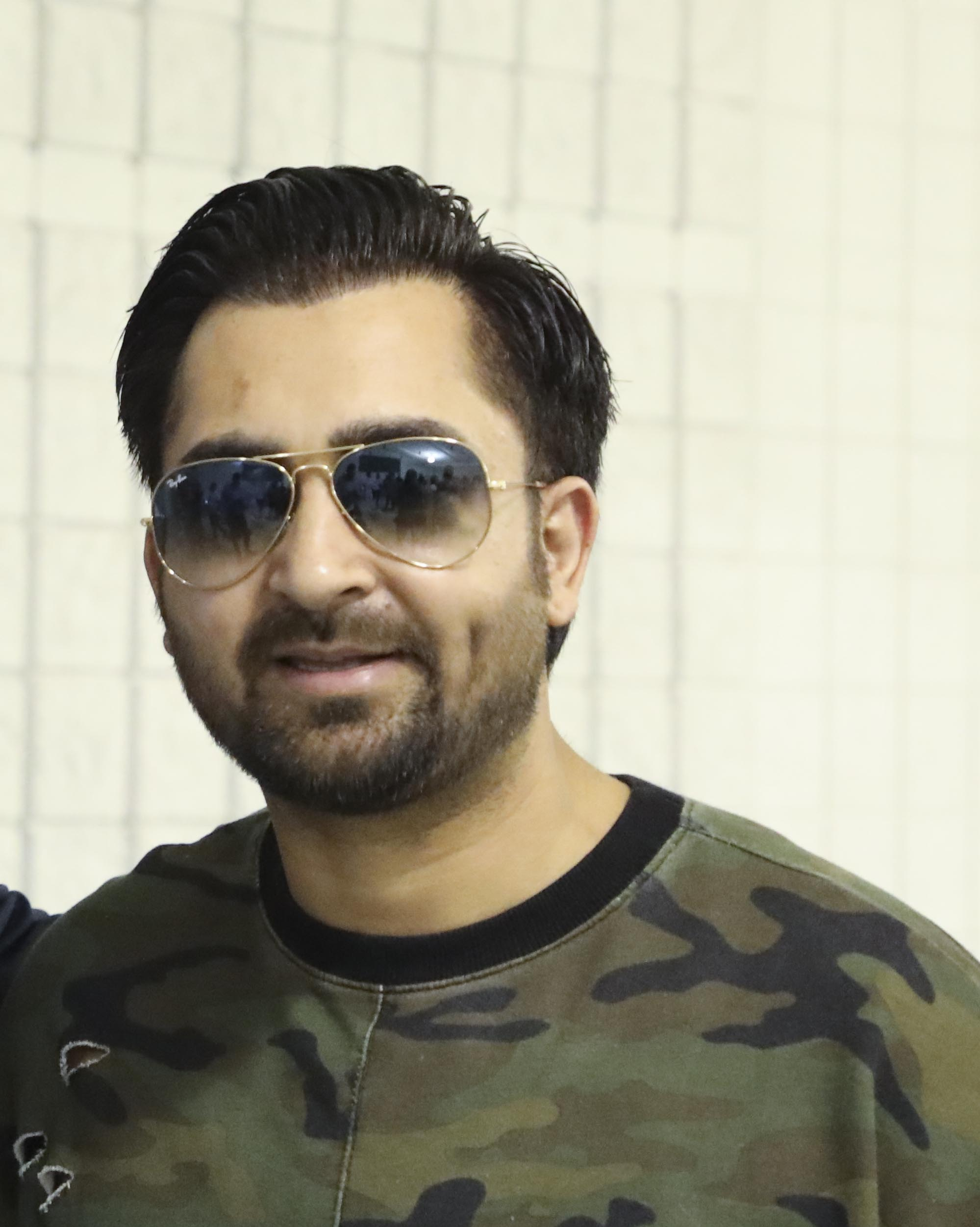
- Sharry Mann

Background information
- Also known as: Sharry Mann
- Born: Surinder Singh Mann; Mohali, Punjab, India
- Genres: Bhangra
- Occupations: Singer, vocalist, lyricist, actor
- Years active: 2010–present
- Label: Yaar Anmulle Records
- Website: www.sharrymaan.net

Surinder Singh "Sharry" Mann is an Indian singer, songwriter, and actor associated with Punjabi music and films. He is best known for his songs "Yaar Anmulle" (2011) and "3 Pegg" (2016).

== Career ==
Mann started his career in 2011 with the song "Yaar Anmulle" which made him famous. The song proved to be massive hit becoming one of the greatest hits of the year. In 2012, he released his album "Aate Di Chiri".

In December 2016, his song "3 Peg" released and currently has over 750 million views on YouTube.

In 2013, he made his acting debut with Oye Hoye Pyar Ho Gaya for which his acting received mixed reviews. His next movie, Ishq Garaari (2013) was more successful at the box office.

In 2019, he won Best Music Video at Brit Asia TV Music Awards for "Yaar Chadeya".

== Discography ==
Album/EP	Year	Music	Label	Tracks
Yaar Anmulle	December 2010	Vinyl Masters aka Andrew Bermi & Sarvpreet Singh Dhammu aka DJ Nick	MovieBox/Speed Records	14
Aate Di Chiri	September 2012	Nick Dhammu	Speed Records	10
Oye Hoye Pyar Ho Gya	May 2013	Gurmeet Singh	Speed Records	8
The Last Good Album	June 2023	Sharry Maan	Maple Music	18
Still	September 2023	Sharry Maan	Maple Music	8
Hawa De Bulle	March 2025	Sharry Maan	White Hill Music	5

== Singles discography ==
Song	Year	Music	Peak chart position	Lyrics	Record label	Notes
Song	Year	Music	UK asian	Lyrics	Record label	Notes
Yaar Anmulle	2011	Vinayl Masters, DJ Nick		Babbu	Speed Records	From the album Yaar Anmulle
Chandigarh Waliye	2012	DJ Nick	—	Sharry Maan	Speed Records	From Album Aate Di Chiri
Yenkne	2012	DJ Nick		Sharry Maan	Speed Records	From Album Aate Di Chiri
Sohne Mukhde Da	2012	DJ Nick		Sharry Maan	Speed Records	From Album Aate Di Chiri
Pooja Kiven Aa	2012	DJ Nick		Kumaar	Speed Records	From movie Jatt & Juliet
Kalla Chann	2014	Nick Dhammu		Sharry Maan	YAR(Yaar Anmulle Records)	First song by him on his own label YAR
Hashtag	2015	JSL [Jaspal]		Sharry Maan	Panj-Aab Records	Written & Directed by: Pankaj Verma
Vaddaa Bai	2016	Nick Dhammu		Sharry Maan	Panj-Aab Records	Video: Navjit Buttar
Carrom Board	2016	GoldBoy		Sharry Maan	Saga Hits	
Dil Da Dimaag	2016	Nick Dhammu		Sharry Maan	T-Series	
3 Peg	2016	Mista Baaz		Ravi Raaj	T-Series	Video: Parmish Verma
Munda Bhal Di	2017	Mista Baaz		Ravi Raaj	T-Series	Video: Los Pro
Jatt Di Canada	2017	DJ Vix		-----	MovieBox/Saga Hits	
Rabb Da Radio	2017	Nick Dhammu		Jass Grewal	White Hill Music	From the movie Rabb Da Radio
Saade Aala	2017	Mista Baaz	15	Gurdeep Manalia	White Hill Music	Video: Pankaj Verma
Hostel	2017	Mista Baaz	1	Jassi Lohka	T-Series	Video: Parmish Verma
Transportiye	2017	Nick Dhammu	12	Sharry Maan, Baljit Singh Gharuan	White Hill Music	
Puraaniyan (The Living Legends)	2017	DJ Vix		-----	MovieBox	With Bhinda Jatt, Saini Surinder, Kulwinder Billa & Jassi Sidhu
Cute Munda	2017	Gift Box		Pargat Singh Zaildar	Lokdhun	Starring-Rumman Ahmed and Sharry Maan, Video Director-Parmish Verma
Love You Sharry Mann	2017	Mistz Baaz		Ravi Raj	Lokdhun	Video Director-Parmish Verma
Motor	2018	Giftrulers		Sharry Maan	Sharry Maan	Video: Pankaj Verma
Yaar Jigree Kasooti Degree	2018	Mista Bazz		Karan Sandha walia	Troll Punjabi	Title song of web-series Yaar Jigree Kasooti Degree
Munda Dil Da Ni Rich Milna	2018	Cheetah		Vinder Nathu Majra	White Hill Music	From Movie "Marriage Palace "
Yaar Chadeya	2018	Snappy		Rav Hanjra	E3UK	Video: Navjit Buttar
PU Di Yaarian	2019	Gift Rulers		Jassi Lohka	T-Series	Video: Bhinder Burj
3 FIRE	2019	Mista Baaz		Sanam Bhullar, Param Sandhu	White Hill Music	Video: Robby Singh
Geddiyan	2019	Mista Baaz		Deep Fateh	Times Music	Video: Jamie
Wedding Song	2020	Inder Dhammu		Bhinder Burj	The Maple Music	Video : Bhinder Burj
Birthday Gift	2020	Mista Baaz		Kaptaan	The Maple Music	Video: Los Pro
Response	2020	Mista Baaz		Kaptaan	The Maple Music	Video : Zorawar Brar
Ghumshuda	2020	Inder Dhammu		Jagdeep	The Maple Music	Video Director: Navjot Baidwan
End Bande	2020	Mista Baaz		Kaptaan	T-Series Apna Punjab	Video: James
4 Saheliyan	2020	GiftRulers		Baljit	The Maple Music	Video : Jashan Nanarh
Bachpan Wala Ghar	2020	Inder Dhammu		Sukhpal Aujla	The Maple Music	From the album Dilwale
Dad Tera	2021	Mista Baaz		Kaptaan	Lokhdun Punjabi	Video : Jashan Nanarh
Gumaan	2021	Nick Dhammu		Gurtez Maan	The Maple Music	From the album Dilwale
Dilwale	2021	Sunny Vik		Dilwala	The Maple Music	Title Track Of Album Dilwale
Kinaare	2021	Inder Dhamnu		Ravi Raaj	The Maple Music	From the album Dilwale
Shakti Water	2022	Mista Baaz		Ravi Raaj	The Maple Music	Single Track

== Filmography ==
Year	Film	Role	Notes
2013	Oye Hoye Pyar Ho Gaya	Sharry	Debut Actor
2013	Ishq Garaari	Sharry	YaadBrar
2016	Nikka Zaildar	–	Guest appearance
2017	Super Singh	Spider-Man	Guest appearance
2017	Nikka Zaildar 2	Wadha Subedar- Varinder	Guest Appearance
2018	Marriage Palace	Nimma	Main Role
