= Fantasy film =

Film genre

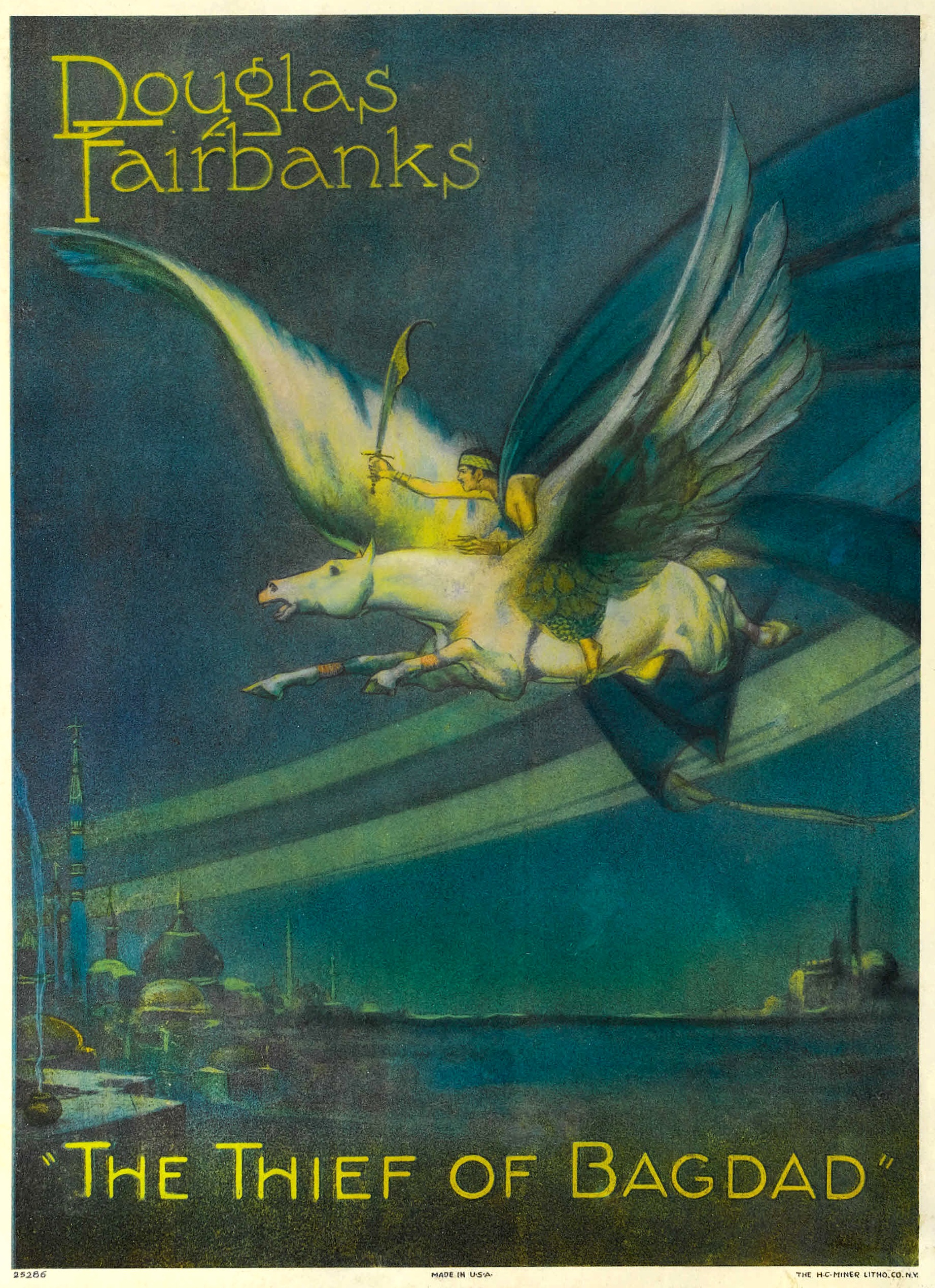
Poster for The Thief of Bagdad, a 1924 American fantasy film.

Fantasy films are films that belong to the fantasy genre with fantastic themes, usually magic, supernatural events, mythology, folklore, or exotic fantasy worlds. The genre is considered a form of speculative fiction alongside science fiction films and horror films, although the genres do overlap. Fantasy films often have an element of magic, myth, wonder, escapism, and the extraordinary.

== Subgenres ==
Several sub-categories of fantasy films can be identified, although the delineations between these subgenres, much as in fantasy literature, are somewhat fluid.

The most common fantasy subgenres depicted in movies are high fantasy and sword and sorcery. Both categories typically employ quasi-medieval settings, wizards, magical creatures and other elements commonly associated with fantasy stories.

High fantasy films tend to feature a more richly developed fantasy world, and may also be more character-oriented or thematically complex. Often, they feature a hero of humble origins and a clear distinction between good and evil set against each other in an epic struggle. Many scholars cite J. R. R. Tolkien's The Lord of the Rings novel as the prototypical modern example of high fantasy in literature, and the recent Peter Jackson film adaptation of the books is a good example of the high fantasy subgenre on the silver screen.

Sword and sorcery movies tend to be more plot-driven than high fantasy and focus heavily on action sequences, often pitting a physically powerful but unsophisticated warrior against an evil wizard or other supernaturally endowed enemy. Although sword and sorcery films sometimes describe an epic battle between good and evil similar to those found in many High fantasy movies, they may alternately present the hero as having more immediate motivations, such as the need to protect a vulnerable maiden or village, or even being driven by the desire for vengeance.

The 1982 film adaptation of Robert E. Howard's Conan the Barbarian, for example, is a personal (non-epic) story concerning the hero's quest for revenge and his efforts to thwart a single megalomaniac—while saving a beautiful princess in the process. Some critics refer to such films by the term Sword and Sandal rather than sword and sorcery, although others would maintain that the Sword and Sandal label should be reserved only for the subset of fantasy films set in ancient history on the planet Earth, and still others would broaden the term to encompass films that have no fantastic elements whatsoever. To some, the term Sword and Sandal has pejorative connotations, designating a film with a low-quality script, bad acting, and poor production values.

Another important subgenre of fantasy films that has become more popular in recent years is contemporary fantasy. Such films feature magical effects or supernatural occurrences happening in the "real" world of today.

Films with live action and animation such as Disney's Mary Poppins, Pete's Dragon, Enchanted, and the Robert Zemeckis film Who Framed Roger Rabbit are also fantasy films although are more often referred to as Live action/animation hybrids (2 of those are also classified as musicals).

Fantasy films set in the afterlife, called Bangsian fantasy, are less common, although films such as the 1991 Albert Brooks comedy Defending Your Life would likely qualify. Other uncommon subgenres include historical fantasy and romantic fantasy, although 2003's Pirates of the Caribbean: The Curse of the Black Pearl successfully incorporated elements of both.

As noted above, superhero movies and fairy tale films might each be considered subgenres of fantasy films, although most would classify them as altogether separate movie genres.

== Fantasy movies and the film industry ==
As a cinematic genre, fantasy has traditionally not been regarded as highly as the related genre of science fiction film. Undoubtedly, the fact that until recently fantasy films often suffered from the "Sword and Sandal" afflictions of inferior production values, over-the-top acting, and decidedly poor special effects was a significant factor in fantasy film's low regard.

Since the early 2000s, however, the genre has gained new respectability in a way, driven principally by the successful adaptations of Tolkien's The Lord of the Rings and J. K. Rowling's Harry Potter series. Jackson's The Lord of the Rings trilogy is notable due to its ambitious scale, serious tone, and thematic complexity. These pictures achieved phenomenal commercial and critical success, and the third installment of the trilogy became the first fantasy film ever to win the Academy Award for Best Picture. The Harry Potter series has been a tremendous financial success, has achieved critical acclaim for its design, thematic sophistication and emotional depth, grittier realism and darkness, narrative complexity, and characterization, and boasts an enormous and loyal fanbase.

Following the success of these ventures, Hollywood studios have greenlighted additional big-budget productions in the genre. These have included adaptations of the first, second, and third books in C. S. Lewis' The Chronicles of Narnia and the teen novel Eragon, as well as adaptations of Susan Cooper's The Dark Is Rising, Cornelia Funke's Inkheart, Philip Pullman's The Golden Compass, Holly Black's The Spiderwick Chronicles, Nickelodeon's TV show Avatar: The Last Airbender, and the Fantasia segment (along with Johann Wolfgang von Goethe's original poem) The Sorcerer's Apprentice

Many fantasy movies starting in the 2000s, such as The Lord of the Rings films, the 1st and 3rd Narnia adaptations, and the 1st, 2nd, 4th and 7th Harry Potter adaptations have most often been released in November and December. This is in contrast to sci-fi films, which are often released during the northern hemisphere summer (June–August). All 3 of the Pirates of the Caribbean films, however, were released in July 2003, July 2006, and May 2007 respectively, and the latest releases in the Harry Potter series were released in July 2007 and July 2009. The huge commercial success of these pictures may indicate a change in Hollywood's approach to big-budget fantasy film releases.

Screenwriter and scholar Eric R. Williams identifies fantasy films as one of eleven super-genres in his screenwriters taxonomy, claiming that all feature length narrative films can be classified by these super-genres. The other 10 super-genres are action, crime, horror, romance, sci-fi, slice of life, sports, thriller, war and western.

== History ==
Fantasy films have a history almost as old as the medium itself. However, fantasy films were relatively few and far between until the 1980s, when high-tech filmmaking techniques and increased audience interest caused the genre to flourish.

What follows are some notable Fantasy films. For a more complete list see: List of fantasy films

=== 1900–1920s ===
In the era of silent film, the earliest fantasy films were those made by French film pioneer Georges Méliès from 1903. The most famous of these was 1902's A Trip to the Moon. In the Golden Age of Silent film (1918–1926) the most outstanding fantasy films were Douglas Fairbanks' The Thief of Bagdad (1924), Fritz Lang's Die Nibelungen (1924), and Destiny (1921). Other notables in the genre were F.W. Murnau's romantic ghost story Phantom, Tarzan of the Apes starring Elmo Lincoln, and D. W. Griffith's The Sorrows of Satan.

=== 1930s ===
Following the advent of sound films, audiences of all ages were introduced from 1937's Snow White and the Seven Dwarfs to 1939's The Wizard of Oz. Also notable of the era, the iconic 1933 film King Kong borrows heavily from the Lost World subgenre of fantasy fiction as does such films as the 1935 adaptation of H. Rider Haggard's novel She about an African expedition that discovers an immortal queen known as Ayesha "She who must be obeyed". Frank Capra's 1937 picture Lost Horizon transported audiences to the Himalayan fantasy kingdom of Shangri-La, where the residents magically never age. Other noteworthy fantasy films of the 30s include Tarzan the Ape Man in 1932 starring Johnny Weissmuller starting a successful series of talking pictures based on the fantasy-adventure novels by Edgar Rice Burroughs and the G. W. Pabst directed The Mistress of Atlantis from 1932. 1932 saw the release of the Universal Studios monster movie The Mummy which combined horror with a romantic fantasy twist. more light-hearted and comedic affairs from the decade include films like 1934s romantic drama film Death Takes a Holiday where Fredric March plays Death who takes a human body to experience life for three days and 1937s Topper where a man is haunted by two fun-loving ghosts who try to make his life a little more exciting.

=== 1940s ===
The 1940s then saw several full-color fantasy films produced by Alexander Korda, including The Thief of Bagdad (1940), a film on par with The Wizard of Oz, and Jungle Book (1942). In 1946, Jean Cocteau's classic adaptation of Beauty and the Beast won praise for its surreal elements and for transcending the boundaries of the fairy tale genre. Sinbad the Sailor (1947), starring Douglas Fairbanks Jr., has the feel of a fantasy film though it does not actually have any fantastic elements.

Several other pictures featuring supernatural encounters and aspects of Bangsian fantasy were produced in the 1940s during World War II. These include Beyond Tomorrow, The Devil and Daniel Webster, and Here Comes Mr. Jordan, all from 1941, Heaven Can Wait the musical Cabin in the Sky (1943), the comedy The Horn Blows at Midnight and romances such as The Ghost and Mrs. Muir (1947), One Touch of Venus and Portrait of Jennie, both 1948.

An astonishing anticipation of the full "sword and sorcery" genre was made in 1941 in Italy by Alessandro Blasetti. La Corona di Ferro presents the struggles of two imaginary kingdoms around the legendary Iron Crown (historically the ancient crown of Italy), with war, cruelty, betrayal, heroism, sex, magic and mysticism, a whirl of events taken from every possible fairy tale and legend source Blasetti could find. This movie is unlike anything done before; indeed, considering that it was finished fifteen years before the publication of Lord Of The Rings, its invention of a vast, national epic mythology is an act of genius. And while the storytelling is rough - due to the need to insert everything - and the resources limited, Blasetti shows how to make a little go a long way through beautifully staged and designed battle and crowd scenes.

Although it's not classified as a fantasy film, Gene Kelly's Anchors Aweigh had a fantasy sequence called "The King who Couldn't Dance" in which Gene did a song and dance number with Jerry Mouse from Tom and Jerry.

Because these movies do not feature elements common to high fantasy or sword and sorcery pictures, some modern critics do not consider them to be examples of the fantasy genre.

=== 1950s ===
In the 1950s there were a few major fantasy films, including Darby O'Gill and the Little People and The 5,000 Fingers of Dr. T., the latter penned by Dr. Seuss. Jean Cocteau's Orphic Trilogy, begun in 1930 and completed in 1959, is based on Greek mythology and could be classified either as fantasy or surrealist film, depending on how the boundaries between these genres are drawn. Russian fantasy director Aleksandr Ptushko created three mythological epics from Russian fairytales, Sadko (1953), Ilya Muromets (1956), and Sampo (1959). Japanese director Kenji Mizoguchi's 1953 film Ugetsu Monogatari draws on Japanese classical ghost stories of love and betrayal.

Other notable pictures from the 1950s that feature fantastic elements and are sometimes classified as fantasy are Harvey (1950), featuring a púca of Celtic mythology; Scrooge, the 1951 adaptation of Charles Dickens' A Christmas Carol; and Ingmar Bergman's 1957 masterpiece, The Seventh Seal. Disney's 1951 animated film Alice in Wonderland is also a fantasy classic.

There were also a number of lower budget fantasies produced in the 1950s, typically based on Greek or Arabian legend. The most notable of these may be 1958's The 7th Voyage of Sinbad, featuring special effects by Ray Harryhausen and music by Bernard Herrmann.

=== 1960s ===
Harryhausen worked on a series of fantasy films in the 1960s, most importantly Jason and the Argonauts (1963). Many critics have identified this film as Harryhausen's masterwork for its stop-motion animated statues, skeletons, harpies, hydra, and other mythological creatures. Other Harryhausen fantasy and science fantasy collaborations from the decade include the 1961 adaptation of Jules Verne's Mysterious Island, the critically panned One Million Years B.C. starring Raquel Welch, and The Valley of Gwangi (1969).

Capitalising on the success of the sword and sandal genre several Italian B-movies based on classical myth were made, including the Maciste series. Otherwise, the 1960s were almost entirely devoid of fantasy films. The fantasy picture 7 Faces of Dr. Lao, in which Tony Randall portrayed several characters from Greek mythology, was released in 1964. But the 1967 adaptation of the Broadway musical Camelot removed most of the fantasy elements from T. H. White's classic The Once and Future King, on which the musical had been based. The 1960s also saw a new adaption of Haggard's She in 1965 starring Ursula Andress as the immortal "She who must be obeyed" and was followed by a sequel in 1968 The Vengeance of She based loosely on the novel Ayesha: The Return of She both produced by Hammer Film Productions. The musical fantasy film Mary Poppins was released in 1964, and 1968 saw the release of Chitty Chitty Bang Bang based on a story by Ian Fleming with a script from Roald Dahl.

=== 1970s ===
Fantasy elements of Arthurian legend were again featured, albeit absurdly, in 1975's Monty Python and the Holy Grail. Harryhausen also returned to the silver screen in the 1970s with two additional Sinbad fantasies, The Golden Voyage of Sinbad (1974) and Sinbad and the Eye of the Tiger (1977). The animated movie Wizards (1977) had limited success at the box office but achieved status as a cult film. There was also The Noah (1975) which was never released theatrically but became a cult favorite when it was finally released on DVD in 2006. Some would consider 1977's Oh God!, starring George Burns to be a fantasy film, and Heaven Can Wait (1978) was a successful Bangsian fantasy remake of 1941's Here Comes Mr. Jordan (not 1943's Heaven Can Wait).

A few low budget "Lost World" pictures were made in the 1970s, such as 1975's The Land That Time Forgot. Otherwise, the fantasy genre was largely absent from mainstream movies in this decade, although 1971's Bedknobs and Broomsticks and Willy Wonka & the Chocolate Factory were two fantasy pictures in the public eye the former being predominantly from the same team who did Mary Poppins the latter again being from Roald Dahl in both script and novel.

=== 1980s ===
1980s fantasy films were initially characterized by directors finding a new spin on established mythologies. Ray Harryhausen brought the monsters of Greek legends to life in Clash of the Titans while Arthurian lore returned to the screen in John Boorman's 1981 Excalibur. Films such as Ridley Scott's 1985 Legend and Terry Gilliam's 1981–1986 trilogy of fantasy epics (Time Bandits, Brazil, and The Adventures of Baron Munchausen) explored a new artist-driven style featuring surrealist imagery and thought-provoking plots. The modern sword and sorcery boom began around the same time with 1982's Conan the Barbarian followed by Krull and Fire and Ice in 1983, as well as a boom in fairy tale-like fantasy films such as The NeverEnding Story (1984), Ladyhawke (1985), The Princess Bride (1987), and Willow (1988).

The 1980s also started a trend in mixing modern settings and action film effects with exotic fantasy-like concepts. Big Trouble in Little China (1986), directed by John Carpenter and starring Kurt Russell, combined humor, martial arts and classic Chinese folklore in a modern Chinatown setting. Highlander, a film about immortal Scottish swordsmen, was released the same year.

Jim Henson produced two iconic fantasy films in the 80s, the solemn The Dark Crystal and the more whimsical and lofty Labyrinth. Meanwhile, Robert Zemeckis helmed Who Framed Roger Rabbit, featuring various famous cartoon characters from animation's "Golden Age," including Mickey Mouse, Minnie Mouse, Donald Duck, Bugs Bunny, Daffy Duck, Droopy, Wile E. Coyote and Road Runner, Sylvester the Cat, Tweety Pie, and Jiminy Cricket, among others.

=== 1990s ===
The 1990s saw the Disney Renaissance in which many successful adaptations of written fantasy works were released by Disney Animation.

Aladdin (1992)
Army of Darkness (1992)
Beauty and the Beast (1991)
Bram Stoker's Dracula (1992)
Dragonheart (1996)
Edward Scissorhands (1990)
Fantasia 2000 (1999)
The Green Mile (1999)
Groundhog Day (1993)
Ghost in the Machine (1995)
Hercules (1997)
Hocus Pocus (1993)
Hook (1991)
The Indian in the Cupboard (1995)
Jumanji (1995)
Kazaam (1996)
Matilda (1996)
Meet Joe Black (1998)
Mulan (1998)
Nightbreed (1990)
The Prince of Egypt (1998)
Princess Mononoke (Mononoke Hime) (1997)
Toy Story (1995)
Toy Story 2 (1999)
The Wind in the Willows (Mr Toad's Wild Ride) (1996)
The Witches (1990)

=== 2000s ===
The 2000s saw a boom in the genre. This was compounded by the success of Lord of The Rings and Harry Potter, which spurred a movement in film adaptations of fantasy literary works including The Chronicles of Narnia, Tales from Earthsea, Eragon, Inkheart, and The Golden Compass. The Star Wars prequel trilogy and Pirates of the Caribbean also saw success at the box office.

13 Going on 30 (2004)
17 Again (2009)
300 (2006)
Alvin & the Chipmunks (2007)
Anji (2004)
Atlantis: The Lost Empire (2001)
Big Fish (2003)
Bridge to Terabithia (2007)
The Brothers Grimm (2005)
The Chronicles of Narnia (2005–10)
Coraline (2009)
Corpse Bride (2005)
Crouching Tiger, Hidden Dragon (2000)
The Curious Case of Benjamin Button (2008)
D-War (2007)
Dorian Gray (2009)
Dungeons & Dragons (2000–12)
Elf (2003)
The Emperor's New Groove (2000)
Enchanted (2007)
Eragon (2006)
Fat Albert (2004)
The Golden Compass (2007)
Harry Potter (2001–11)
The Hexer (2001)
How the Grinch Stole Christmas (2000)
Howl's Moving Castle (2004)
The Imaginarium of Doctor Parnassus (2009)
Imagine That (2009)
Inkheart (2008)
The Invention of Lying (2009)
King Kong (2005)
Lady in the Water (2006)
Lemony Snicket's A Series of Unfortunate Events (2004)
Looney Tunes: Back in Action (2003)
The Lord of the Rings (2001–03)
The Lovely Bones (2008)
The Master of Disguise (2002)
Monsters Inc. (2001–13)
Nanny McPhee (2005)
Night Watch (2004)
Pan's Labyrinth (2006)
Peter Pan (2003)
Pirates of the Caribbean (2003-17)
Prezzemolo (2003)
Race to Witch Mountain (2009)
The Science of Sleep (2006)
The Secret of Kells (2009)
The Seeker: The Dark Is Rising (2007)
Shrek (2001–10)
Spider-Man (Raimi trilogy) (2002–07)
The Spiderwick Chronicles (2008)
Spike (2008)
Spirited Away (2002)
Stardust (2007)
Star Wars Episodes I-III (1999–2005)
Tales from Earthsea ((2006)
Treasure Planet (2002)
Twilight (2008–12)
Underworld (2003–16)
Where the Wild Things Are (2009)
Zathura: A Space Adventure (2005)

=== 2010s ===
The early 2010s saw a continuation of the book to screen adaptation fad of the 2000s. The Marvel Cinematic Universe dominated the genre in the decade regarding box office returns with Avengers: Endgame becoming the highest grossing film not adjusted for inflation. Also prevalent in the decade were remakes of older fantasy films especially from Walt Disney Pictures.

Abraham Lincoln: Vampire Hunter (2012)
Aladdin (2019)
Alice in Wonderland (2010)
Alice Through the Looking Glass (2016)
Aquaman (2018)
A Monster Calls (2016)
A Wrinkle in Time (2018)
Baahubali: The Beginning (2014)
Baahubali 2: The Conclusion (2017)
Beauty and the Beast (2017)
Black Panther (2018)
Brave (2012)
Christopher Robin (2018)
Cinderella (2015)
Clash of the Titans (2010) and its 2012 sequel, Wrath of the Titans
Conan the Barbarian (2011)
Crimson Peak (2015)
Dark Shadows (2012)
Doctor Strange (2016)
Fantastic Beasts: The Crimes of Grindelwald (2018)
Fantastic Beasts and Where to Find Them (2016)
Frozen (2013)
Frozen II (2019)
Godzilla: King of the Monsters (2019)
Goosebumps (2015)
Gulliver's Travels (2010)
Harry Potter and the Deathly Hallows – Part 1 (2010)
Harry Potter and the Deathly Hallows – Part 2 (2011)
Hop (2011)
How to Train Your Dragon (2010–19)
Immortals (2011)
Into the Woods (2014)
Jack the Giant Slayer (2013)
John Carter (2012)
Life of Pi (2012)
Maleficent (2014)
Maleficent: Mistress of Evil (2019)
Mary Poppins Returns (2018)
Maximum Shame (2010)
Midnight in Paris (2011)
Mirror Mirror (2012)
Miss Peregrine's Home for Peculiar Children (2016)
Oz the Great and Powerful (2013)
Paddington (2014)
Pan (2015)
Percy Jackson & the Olympians: Sea of Monsters (2013)
Percy Jackson & the Olympians: The Lightning Thief (2010)
Pete's Dragon (2016)
Peter Rabbit (2018)
Prince of Persia: The Sands of Time (2010)
Puss in Boots (2011)
Sardaar Ji (2015) (Punjabi)
Scott Pilgrim vs. the World (2010)
Seventh Son (2014)
Snow White and the Huntsman (2012)
Song of the Sea (2014)
Sucker Punch (2011)
The BFG (2016)
The Hobbit (2012–14)
The Jungle Book (2016)
The Kid Who Would Be King (2019)
The Last Airbender (2010)
The Lorax (2012)
The Muppets (2011)
The Nutcracker and the Four Realms (2018)
Trolls (2016)
The Shape of Water (2017)
The Sorcerer's Apprentice (2010)
Thor: Ragnarok (2017)
Thor: The Dark World (2013)
Thor (2011)
Toy Story 3 (2010)
Toy Story 4 (2019)
Wonder Woman (2017)
Your Highness (2011)

=== 2020s ===
The 2020s as of 2023 have shown an increasing interest by studios to adapt games into film with Monster Hunter, Sonic the Hedgehog, The Super Mario Bros. Movie, and Dungeons & Dragons: Honor Among Thieves.

Bloodshot (2020)
Dolittle (2020)
Dragonheart: Vengeance (2020)
Dungeons & Dragons: Honor Among Thieves (2023)
Encanto (2021)
Fantastic Beasts: The Secrets of Dumbledore (2022)
Fantasy Island (2020)
Jiu Jitsu (2020)
Monster Hunter (2020)
Mulan (2020)
Nahuel and the Magic Book (2020)
The Old Guard (2020)
Onward (2020)
Sonic the Hedgehog (2020)
Sonic the Hedgehog 2 (2022)
Spider-Man: No Way Home (2021)
The Super Mario Bros. Movie (2023)
Trolls World Tour (2020)
The Witches (2020)
Wonder Woman 1984 (2020)
Wolfwalkers (2020)
KPop Demon Hunters (2025)

== See also ==
- Fantasy television
- List of fantasy films
- List of highest-grossing fantasy films
