= Fantasy television =

Genre of television programming often based on fantasy fiction works

Fantasy television is a genre of television programming featuring elements of the fantastic, often including magic, supernatural forces, or exotic fantasy worlds. Fantasy television programs are often based on tales from mythology and folklore, or are adapted from fantasy stories in other media. The boundaries of fantasy television often overlap with science fiction and horror but also realistic fiction.

== Genre and subgenres ==
Similar to the difficulty faced by scholars of fantasy film, classifying a television program as fantasy can be somewhat problematic given the fluid boundaries of the genre. Not all programs with fantastic elements may qualify as fantasy. Children's programs in particular often feature fantastic elements that do not qualify the program as fantasy, such as the giant talking avian Big Bird of the popular PBS series Sesame Street. Nevertheless, some critics classify certain children's programs that feature traditional fantasy elements such as barbarian characters, wizards, and magic swords as part of the genre (see, for example, He-Man and the Masters of the Universe).

Programs for general audiences may also be difficult to classify. The program The Twilight Zone presented a series of unrelated stories, some of which were works of science fiction and some of which were tales of fantasy. The more generic term "speculative fiction" might be appropriate for such shows. Other series blend the fantasy and horror genres, such as Buffy the Vampire Slayer and Angel. And still other programs feature dream sequences or other surreal elements, yet would not be considered fantasy shows by most fans or critics. Some of these programs serve as examples of the magical realism genre rather than fantasy, such as HBO's Six Feet Under, which featured a realistic setting except for occasional scenes in which living and dead characters interact. In the United Kingdom, the term "telefantasy" is used as an umbrella term to collectively describe all types of programs that feature elements of the fantastic.

Some critics consider superhero programs to be works of fantasy ("superhero fantasy"), but others classify them as science fiction and still others consider them to be their own genre of programming (see, for example, Wonder Woman and Lois & Clark). Proper classification is similarly ambiguous for the Tokusatsu superhero programs from Japan, such as Mahō Sentai Magiranger.

A wide variety of fantasy subgenres have been represented on television, both as original series and as television broadcasts of fantasy films. Typical examples of original programming in various subgenres include:

- Comic fantasy: Bewitched, I Dream of Jeannie, Sabrina the Teenage Witch, My Babysitter's A Vampire
- Contemporary fantasy: Buffy the Vampire Slayer, Angel, Charmed, True Blood, Lost, Heroes, Supernatural, The Secret Circle, The Vampire Diaries, Once Upon a Time, Grimm
- High fantasy: The Sci-Fi Channel's Earthsea miniseries, Game of Thrones, Alif Laila
- Historical fantasy: TNT's adaptation of The Mists of Avalon
- "Lost World" stories: Land of the Lost
- Romantic fantasy: The CBS series Beauty and the Beast
- Sword and sorcery: Hercules: The Legendary Journeys, Xena: Warrior Princess, The Adventures of Sinbad, Legend of the Seeker, Merlin, Wizards and Warriors

== See also ==
- List of fantasy television programs
- Dark fantasy
- Fantaserye
- Mythopoeia
- Science fantasy
- Science fiction on television
