= List of Space Rangers characters =

The American science fiction television series Space Rangers has a principal cast of six characters.

== Cast ==
- Captain John Boon (Jeff Kaake)
- Doc Kreugar (Jack McGee)
- Jojo Thorson (Marjorie Monaghan)
- Zylyn (Cary-Hiroyuki Tagawa)
- Daniel Kincaid (Danny Quinn)
- Commander Chennault (Linda Hunt)

=== Recurring ===
- Dr Mimmer (Clint Howard)
- Colonel Erich Weiss (Gottfried John)

== Characters ==
=== Captain John Boon ===
Boon is leader of Ranger Slingship #377. He is a hard-boiled cop whose chief concerns are getting the job done and returning his Rangers home safely. He carries a 20th-century U.S. silver dollar in his pocket on missions as a good luck charm. His personal life is a different story as he is estranged from his wife Sarah and young daughter. They have relocated back to Earth, leaving Boon alone at Fort Hope.

=== Doc Kreugar ===
Slingship #377's flight engineer. Doc has been injured in the line of duty so many times that more of his body is mechanical now than organic. He would have been discharged from the Rangers ages ago except that he has bribed officials in order to remain. He's rude, smokes cigars, is usually unshaven, and likes to listen to loud Motown music. As a child, Doc grew up in space with his father going from one deep-space freighter assignment to another.

=== Jojo Thorson ===
Slingship #377's pilot. Jojo is a tall, blond, Amazonian-like woman. She comes from the colony of New Venus. She is a loose cannon, but she is also very loyal to her team and the best pilot in the Rangers Corps. She often drinks too much black coffee before a mission and at times it reflects in her piloting. She has a particular distaste for Banshees and has a temper that has gotten her in trouble on more than one occasion.

=== Zylyn ===
A warrior-monk from the planet Graaka. He is one of only four Graaka serving in the Rangers Corps. Zylyn's people were once considered the fiercest warriors in the galaxy until they decided to embrace the ways of peace. Graakas also have the ability to be semi-telepathic as they can read intense thoughts. Zylyn wears a cybernetic pacifier collar to help control his aggressive tendencies. He takes it off only when the situation calls for him to fight.

=== Daniel Kincaid ===
Kincaid is the rookie on Boon's team. He is the son of a general in Earth's Central Command. He is often referred to as the team's "back-man". That is to say he is the team's back-up in a firefight. He has a very "gung-ho" attitude in field and as such Boon often assigns him guard duty to help temper his demeanor.

=== Dr. Mimmer ===
Mimmer is chief medic & forensics scientist at Fort Hope. He is very talkative and nobody can tolerate his presence for very long.

=== Commander Chennault ===
Chennault is commanding officer and head magistrate on Fort Hope. Despite her rank she thinks of herself as a leader of a colony before her military position. She expresses an almost "mother hen" approach to keeping her people safe.

=== Colonel Erich Weiss ===
Weiss is second-in-command at Fort Hope. He apparently angered someone at Central Command as he lost his comfortable office on Earth and was transferred against his will to Avalon's Fort Hope. He constantly is trying to "improve" the Rangers so he can get transferred back to Earth. The results have left him butting heads with both Boon and Chennault on more than one occasion. His personal interests include chess, brandy, and playing his violin.
