= Any Day Now (2012 film) =

2012 American drama film

- Theatrical release poster
- Directed by: Travis Fine
- Written by: Travis Fine; George Arthur Bloom
- Produced by: Travis Fine; Kristine Fine; Liam Finn; Chip Hourihan
- Starring: Alan Cumming; Garret Dillahunt; Gregg Henry; Jamie Anne Allman; Chris Mulkey; Don Franklin; Kelli Williams; Alan Rachins; Frances Fisher; Isaac Leyva
- Cinematography: Rachel Morrison
- Edited by: Tom Cross
- Music by: Joey Newman
- Production company: PFM Pictures
- Distributed by: Music Box Films
- Release dates: April 20, 2012 (Tribeca); December 14, 2012 (United States)
- Running time: 97 minutes
- Country: United States
- Language: English
- Box office: $201,747

Any Day Now is a 2012 American drama film directed by Travis Fine, who rewrote the original screenplay that George Arthur Bloom had written 30 years previously. Alan Cumming and Garret Dillahunt star as a gay couple who assume guardianship of a teenage boy who has Down syndrome, only to find themselves at odds with the biological mother and California's family law courts.

The film premiered at the 2012 Tribeca Film Festival, where Music Box Films acquired distribution. It received a limited theatrical release on December 14, 2012, to positive reviews.

== Plot ==
Rudy Donatello is a struggling musician and drag performer in a gay nightclub "Fabios" in 1979 West Hollywood, where he meets Paul Fleiger, a closeted district attorney. Returning home to his apartment, Rudy sees that his junkie neighbor Marianna has left her son Marco, a thirteen-year-old who has down syndrome, home alone. The next morning, following a dispute with landlord Mr. Blum, Rudy discovers Marianna has not returned. He takes Marco to Paul's workplace for advice on what to do, however Paul becomes anxious over their sudden appearance, abruptly telling him to contact Family Services and not to appear there again. Fearing that Marco will be mistreated if placed into foster care, a frustrated Rudy accuses him of neglecting them based on fears that his colleagues now suspect that he is a homosexual. As they return home, brute family services officer Miss Martinez awaits and remorselessly moves Marco into a foster home. He however struggles to settle in and escapes during the night.

Paul re-visits Fabios and makes amends with Rudy. On their way home, they see Marco wandering the streets in search of his home and subsequently decide to house him for the night. The following morning, Marco and Rudy bond before Blum appears at the door harassing him for rent. Fearing he will report Marco's presence to family services, Rudy enlists Paul to help him gain custody. The two visit Marianna in prison and promise her they will take good care of him if she allows, although Paul annoys Rudy as he tells her that they are just friends. Though Marianna guesses that they are in a relationship, she signs temporary guardianship papers. When having the court approve the papers, Paul states to Judge Meyerson that he and Rudy are cousins. Though suspicious of his claim, she awards them temporary custody of Marco. Upon the three moving in together, Marco is elated with his new "home." Upon a medical checkup, Paul and Rudy are advised that Marco has not been well cared for and his disability may see them undertake parenting for the rest of his life. Undeterred, over one year they improve his overall health and diet, enlist him into special education, and subsequently see his social and intellectual skills flourish. Having celebrated Halloween, Christmas and Marco's fourteenth birthday together, he now lovingly refers to them as his "two daddies." Paul is also promoted at the District Attorney's office, whilst he and Marco support Rudy with his desire to become a professional singer.

Wishing to know more about Paul following his promotion, District Attorney Wilson invites the trio to a party at his home. Rudy however becomes angered when Paul continues to refer to him as his "cousin" who "has a child." Paul's secretary Monica notices Wilson's suspicion of Paul and Rudy's intimacy, and pretends to flirt with him whilst Rudy suspects Paul has no intention of revealing to anyone that he is his lover. Paul privately confesses to Rudy that he suspects Wilson is homophobic and will terminate their custody of Marco if he suspects they are a couple. Wilson sees them arguing and fires Monica and Paul the following day, whilst also reporting the inaccuracies on their custody forms to the court. Family services abruptly remove Marco from their care as an overwrought Rudy is arrested for physically attempting to stop them. An enraged Paul negotiates Rudy's bail and convinces him to quit working as a drag performer in the hope of the court over-turning the decision and him continuing to practice law. The duo are condemned by Judge Meyerson for hiding the true nature of their relationship at the time of signing custodial papers, however allows them to apply for sole custody pending an investigation into their time with Marco and his proposed living environment.

The district attorney's office launch several shameless accusations of paedophilia and dispute same-sex adoption, despite Marco informing the court's representative Miss Mills that he was treated well and of his sole desire to live with them. Paul and Rudy insist Marco has shown them both the real joy of what it means to be a parent and will raise him to be a good man. After having their home positively evaluated, it appears they are set to receive custody, leading Rudy to contact Marco and tell him he will be "home" shortly. A delighted Marco prepares to leave and anxiously waits for them, however Judge Meyerson decides against returning him to their care, stating that the duo kissing in front of him and having Marco visit Fabios, despite only attending when closed and Rudy never dress-rehearsing in front of him, as inappropriate. A distraught Marco is soon moved into a state run foster center for children who have disabilities. Refusing to give up on their fight for custody, Paul seeks the help of lawyer Lonnie Washington to help over-turn the decision. A new judge, Richard Resnick, agrees to review the case and approves them to visit Marco only once before the hearing. Paul and Rudy are saddened to see that he has lost weight, not communicating as well as he used to and is possibly suffering from depression. Following Washington's adamant belief that he has developed a strong case detailing that Fisher's ruling was not in the best interests of the child, merely homophobic and potentially unlawful, Paul and Rudy are confident that they will be awarded full custody of Marco. The case is however immediately dismissed following Marianna, now out of prison, appearing in person to apply for reunification with Marco under legal guidance from the district attorney's office. Despite Rudy emphatically alleging that she has been persuaded or bribed by Wilson to take Marco back, has not contacted Marco for over a year, disputes how long she has been out for and citing her clear uncertainty, she receives custody. Washington tells a mellowed Paul and Rudy that gaining custodial rights from Marianna is now all but impossible and advises them to wait until Marco is older and free from his mother's control before they can hope he will come and find them.

Marco is valeted to what he is told is his "home." Upon arriving at his mother's new apartment, he is repeatedly ignored as he tells the valets "this is not my home." Marianna uses drugs and has sex directly in front of Marco, whilst her boyfriend verbally abuses him. She tells him to wait outside the apartment until she calls him back in. Unhappy with his new living environment, Marco begins to wander the streets in search of Paul and Rudy. Some time later, Paul writes several letters to the judges and district attorney's office attaching a small newspaper article to each, informing that Marco died under a bridge after three days of wandering, failing to find his way "home." Both devastated by his death, Paul watches Rudy sing "I Shall Be Released" in tribute to Marco.

== Cast ==
- Alan Cumming as Rudy Donatello
- Garret Dillahunt as Paul Fliger
- Gregg Henry as Lambert
- Jamie Anne Allman as Marianna DeLeon
- Chris Mulkey as District Attorney Wilson
- Don Franklin as Lonnie Washington
- Kelli Williams as Miss Flemming
- Alan Rachins as Judge Richard Resnick
- Frances Fisher as Judge Meyerson
- Isaac Leyva as Marco DeLeon
- Mindy Sterling as Miss Mills
- Miracle Laurie as Monica
- Michael Nouri as Miles Dubrow
- Jeffrey Pierce as Officer Plitt
- Anne O'Shea as Mrs. Lowell
- Randy Roberts as P.J.
- Louis Lombardi as Mr. Blum
- Joe Howard as Dr. Watkins
- Randy Thompson as "Coco"
- Ezra Buzzington as Larry
- Clyde Kusatsu as Dr. Nakahura
- Kamala Lopez as Agent Martinez

== Production history ==
In a 2013 interview, Bloom explained that the film is inspired by that of Rudy, a gay man in Brooklyn that he had met in 1980. Despite having very little money and a tiny apartment, Rudy befriended a 12-year-old autistic boy who had been abandoned by his prostitute mother and lived with his grandmother. Rudy basically raised the boy, feeding and clothing him and getting him into a school. Bloom wondered what would happen if Rudy wanted to adopt the boy. which led to the original screenplay, which he completed 1980.

It would take 32 years for the screenplay to become a film. Bloom's son worked as the music supervisor on the television series Glee. The younger Bloom had helped his high school friend, Travis Fine, with the music for Fine's 2010 film, The Space Between. When Fine later mentioned that "he was looking for another movie to do, something small, with heart, and about something important", the younger Bloom told him of his father's 1980 screenplay. Fine received Bloom's permission to do some rewrites, then acted as producer and director to get the film made.

== Reception ==
=== Critical response ===
On the review aggregator website Rotten Tomatoes, 79% of 68 critics' reviews are positive, with an average rating of 6.7/10. Metacritic, which uses a weighted average, assigned the film a score of 60 out of 100, based on 16 critics, indicating "mixed or average" reviews.

=== Box office ===
Any Day Now had a limited theatrical release, shown in fewer than 20 theaters at any point during its entire run. It grossed just over $201,000 in the United States and Canada, and just over $60,000 in other territories, for a worldwide total of $261,747.

== Awards ==
- Chicago International Film Festival 2012 - Audience Choice Award for Best Narrative Feature
- Seattle International Film Festival 2012 - Best Actor Award, Alan Cumming
- Seattle International Film Festival 2012 - Best Film
- Tribeca Film Festival 2012 - Heineken Audience Award
- Outfest 2012 - Audience Award - Outstanding Dramatic Feature Film
- Outfest 2012 - Outstanding Actor in a US Dramatic Feature Film, Alan Cumming
- Provincetown International Film Festival 2012 - Audience Award
- Woodstock Film Festival 2012 - Audience Award
- GLAAD Media Award 2012 - Best Film in Limited Release
