= Don Franklin =

American actor (b. 1960)

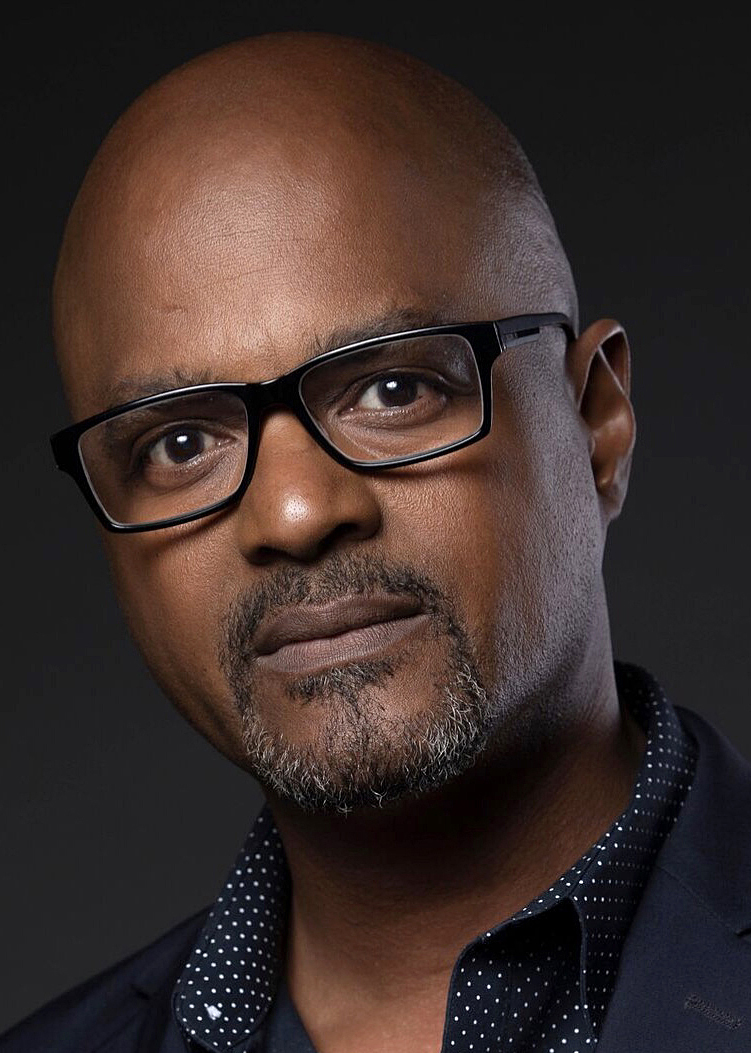
- Born: December 14, 1960 (age 65); Chicago, Illinois, U.S.
- Occupation: Actor
- Years active: 1976–present
- Spouse(s): Sheila Burke (m. 19??; div. 1997) Kristine Franklin (m. 2002; div. 2014)
- Children: 2

Don Franklin (born December 14, 1960) is an American actor, best known for his work in seaQuest DSV as Commander Jonathan Ford, Seven Days as Captain Craig Donovan, and Alex Wheeler in the Dick Wolf TV pilot and series Nasty Boys.

In 1989, Franklin became the first Black actor to co-star in a US television western, as Noah Dixon, one of The Young Riders.

== Background ==
Early on, Franklin worked extensively as a professional dancer and actor in the Chicago area, earning a Best Actor nomination through the Joseph Jefferson Awards. He also worked with the venerable Sidney Poitier, who directed Franklin in the 1985 film Fast Forward.

While on the TV series Seven Days, Franklin gained the distinction of the actor most often killed on the show. He later played two different characters during his time on the NCIS franchise, both as FBI Agent Ron Sacks on the original NCIS, and Captain Alan Beck on the spinoff show NCIS: Los Angeles.

== Personal life ==
Franklin was born and raised in Chicago and graduated from Whitney M. Young Magnet High School. He has a daughter with his first wife Sheila, and a son with his second wife, Kristine, from whom he is now divorced.

== Partial filmography ==
- Northville Cemetery Massacre (1976) - Officer Fedorko
- Somewhere in Time (1980) - Tourist in Hall of History #2
- Fast Forward (1985) - Michael Stafford
- The Cosby Show (1987, TV Series) - Greg Martinson
- Moving (1988) - Kevin
- Knightwatch (1988–1989, TV Series) - Calvin Garvey
- The Big Picture (1989) - Todd Marvin
- Nasty Boys movie (1989, Dick Wolf TV pilot) - Alex Wheeler
- Nasty Boys series (1989-1990, Dick Wolf TV series) - Alex Wheeler
- The Young Riders (1990–1992, TV Series) - Noah Dixon
- seaQuest DSV (1993–1996, TV Series) - Commander Jonathan Ford
- Asteroid (1997, TV Movie) - Ben Dodd
- Living Single (1997, TV Series) - Dexter Knight
- Moesha (1998, TV Series) - Shelby
- Seven Days (1998–2001, TV Series) - Captain Craig Donovan
- Girlfriends (2001–2002, TV Series) - Stan
- The District (2001–2003, TV Series) - AJ
- Anna's Dream (2002, TV Movie) - Tommy Thompson
- Hair Show (2004) - Basil
- CSI: Miami (2005, TV Series) - Bart Jameson
- Black Dawn (2005, Video) - Max Pierson
- NCIS (2005–2006, TV Series) - FBI Agent Ron Sacks
- NCIS: Los Angeles (2009) - Captain Alan Beck
- Day Break (2006–2007, TV Series) - Randall Mathis
- Journeyman (2007, TV Series) - Ed Macklin
- Chrissa Stands Strong (2009, Video) - Mr. Beck (girl’s teacher)
- The Shift (2009, Video) - Rob (The Cinematographer)
- The Closer (2009, TV Series) - Kelvin Blake
- The Space Between (2010) - Paul Ehrlich
- Any Day Now (2012) - Lonnie Washington
- Insecure (TV series) (2018, TV Series) - Malcolm
