= The Young Riders =

- DVD cover of the first Season 1 box set
- Genre: Western
- Created by: Ed Spielman
- Starring: Stephen Baldwin; Josh Brolin; Brett Cullen; Travis Fine; Don Franklin; Melissa Leo; Ty Miller; Christopher Pettiet; Gregg Rainwater; Yvonne Suhor; Clare Wren; Anthony Zerbe
- Composer: John Debney
- Country of origin: United States
- Original language: English
- No. of seasons: 3
- No. of episodes: 68 (list of episodes)

Production
- Executive producers: Jonas McCord, Scott Shepherd
- Camera setup: Single-camera
- Running time: 45–48 minutes
- Production companies: Ogiens/Kane Company; MGM Television

Original release
- Network: ABC
- Release: September 20, 1989 – July 23, 1992

The Young Riders is an American Western television series created by Ed Spielman that presents a fictionalized account of a group of young Pony Express riders (some of whom are young versions of legendary figures in Old West history) based at the Sweetwater Station in the Nebraska Territory during the years leading up to the American Civil War. The series premiered on ABC on September 20, 1989 and ran for three seasons until the final episode aired on July 23, 1992.

== Production ==
Filming of the original pilot for the series took place in California. After the ABC network picked it up, the series production moved to Tucson, Arizona, with filming in "Mescal", a western-themed movie town operated by Old Tucson Studios.

Before the series premiere, producers of the 1988 film Young Guns filed a lawsuit against ABC and the series producers, claiming the series title combined with its plot infringed on their trademark.

In the second season, Don Franklin joined the cast to portray the character Noah Dixon. In doing so, he became the third African-American actor to hold a starring role in a television western – after Raymond St. Jacques, who had co-starred on the final season of Rawhide as cattle drover Simon Blake (1965) and Otis Young, who co-starred with Don Murray on the short-lived (1968–69) TV series The Outcasts. Having never ridden a horse before, Franklin was sent to "Cowboy Camp" for 3–4 days where he learned how to mount and dismount, and the basics of riding. Desiring to also work behind the cameras, Franklin talked with producers about writing and directing an episode for the series. In an interview, he noted that the series producers were very receptive and was regularly encouraging the cast to not only make suggestions, but also follow through with them. When the cast noted that they didn't like the series becoming a "guest-villain-of-the-week", it was changed to refocus back on the individual characters and their relationships with each other. Franklin himself also encouraged that more black characters be included in the series.

== Characters ==
Aloysius "Teaspoon" Hunter (Anthony Zerbe)
A former Texas Ranger and one of the few survivors of the Battle of the Alamo. A colorful yet immensely wise character, Teaspoon can be a tough task master but he cares about all of his riders.

The Kid (Ty Miller)
A soft-spoken boy from Virginia, The Kid is the first character introduced in the series. Like most of the other riders, he is an orphan. The Kid is quick-witted but still has a lot to learn. He loves his horse, Katy, whom he purchased with the money he won in a boxing match.

William F. Cody (Stephen Baldwin)
Buffalo Bill, who usually goes by Cody, is arrogant, brash, and a bit on the goofy side, but also devoted to his friends. He is an excellent shot with long arms such as rifles. He and Jimmy maintain a sibling-like rivalry.

James Butler Hickok (Josh Brolin)
Wild Bill, usually referred to as Jimmy, is hot-tempered and quick to go for his gun. He is a fast draw and gains a reputation as a gunslinger that he doesn't particularly want as it causes people to come challenge him. His temper frequently gets him in trouble, though Teaspoon and Sam try to help him learn to control it.

Buck Cross (Running Buck) (Gregg Rainwater)
The son of a Kiowa mother and white father, Buck never truly fit in with his tribe, prompting him to leave and join the Pony Express. He occasionally faces discrimination from townsfolk but his friends are quick to stick up for him. He is close friends with Ike.

Louise "Lou" McCloud (Yvonne Suhor)
Lou is the shortest of the riders, but also one of the most skilled. She has a strong sense of right and wrong. Lou initially presents herself as a man in order to get the job. Upon learning this, the other riders agree to maintain her guise. She eventually falls in love with and marries The Kid.

Sam Cain (Brett Cullen) Season 1
The current marshal of Sweetwater, and a former gunslinger. He is in love with Emma and she finally marries him at the end of Season 1. Because of his own past, Sam tries to help Hickok deal with his growing gunslinger reputation.

Ike McSwain (Travis Fine)
Ike is mute and bald, but that doesn't keep him from being an excellent rider. He is particularly close to Buck, who taught him sign language. Ike can be very passionate about protecting people.

Noah Dixon (Don Franklin) Seasons 2-3
A free-born black man who joins the Riders in the second season.

Emma Shannon (Melissa Leo) Season 1
The caretaker of the station and the riders. Though she can be just as tough as Teaspoon when the riders do wrong, she tries to be a mother to them all. She is in love with Marshal Cain, but because of her past, she hesitates to marry him until the end of the first season.

Jesse James (Christopher Pettiet) Season 3
A young boy who joins the riders in the third season.

Rachel Dunn (Clare Wren) Seasons 2-3
Rachel takes on the role of station caretaker after Emma leaves.

=== Guest stars ===
Many prominent actors guest-starred on the show, including Mitchell Ryan, Rob Estes, Chris Penn, Lloyd Bochner, Jay O. Sanders, Ted Shackelford, Roger Rees, James Gammon, Meg Foster, Albert Salmi, Kelli Williams, Fisher Stevens, Della Reese, Melissa Michaelsen, David Carradine, Stacy Keach Sr., Pernell Roberts, David Soul, Cynthia Nixon, Richard Roundtree, Buck Taylor, Nick Ramus, Jamie Walters, Frances Fisher, Noble Willingham, James Cromwell, William Russ, John Slattery, Rebecca Staab, Jim Beaver, Peter MacNicol, Tim Thomerson, Stan Shaw, Bart the Bear, Brian Keith, Park Overall, Brian Bonsall, John Schuck, Gloria Reuben, Khrystyne Haje, Gary Sandy, John de Lancie, Tammy Grimes, Frederic Forrest, Frederick Coffin, Cliff DeYoung, William Sanderson, Sydney Walsh, Cassie Yates, Robert Clohessy, Jenny O'Hara, and Nick Young.

== Episodes ==
Season	Episodes	Originally released	
Season	Episodes	First released	Last released
1	24	September 20, 1989	May 14, 1990
2	22	September 22, 1990	May 4, 1991
3	22	September 28, 1991	July 23, 1992

== Reception ==
In its first year on the air, The Young Riders was plagued by low ratings. In November 1989, it ranked 60th out of 84 programs for its time slot in the Nielsen ratings. In its second season, the series was given a new timeslot and made a dramatic turn around, winning its time slot five out of its first seven weeks, and consistently outperformed the other critically acclaimed shows on the night China Beach and Twin Peaks. Though still only ranked 57th in the Nielsen Ratings, it began building a "small, but loyal" following among teens and young adults.

Diane Holloway of the Austin American-Statesman felt it offered a new take on the standard Western, and praised the series for its "beautiful" cinematography. The Philadelphia Inquirer's Ken Tucker heavily criticized the series when it premiered considering it "one of the season's most pretentious bombs" and feeling "everything about [it] is overdone" including the acting. Considering it a rip-off of the films Young Guns and The Long Riders, Tucker considered the series failed at period authenticity and thought the riders dressed no different from 1980s young adults. Writing for The Atlanta Journal, Phil Kloer agreed with Tucker, also calling the series a rip-off of Young Guns. Kloer considered the pilot to be "not particularly good or bad", and felt the series was doomed to fail quickly. He did, however, praise the series cinematography as being "more like a film than a TV series, very beautiful with lots of soft light". Ron Miller of TV Weekly, however, praised the series when it was released. As it entered its second season, he renewed his praise, noting the more successful series was now "thumbing its nose at all the prognosticators" who had considered it unlikely to succeed.

== Home media ==
MGM released the first season of The Young Riders as a single Region 1 DVD box set on March 21, 2006.

The season 1 set was released to Region 2 (Europe) on January 15, 2007.

TGG Direct released season 3 on DVD in Region 1 for the very first time on January 29, 2013. They also re-released the first season on the same day. Season 2 was released on October 22, 2013. However, due to clearance issues, the episodes "Born to Hang," "Bad Company," "Blood Money," and "Littlest Cowboy" were excluded. Another Season 2 set was released in 2014. In addition to the four episodes excluded from the 2013 release, the 2014 set also excludes the episodes "Dead Ringer" and "The Play's the Thing".
