= List of The Young Riders episodes =

This is a list of episodes of the ABC television series The Young Riders.

== Series overview ==
Season	Episodes	Originally released	
Season	Episodes	First released	Last released
1	24	September 20, 1989	May 14, 1990
2	22	September 22, 1990	May 4, 1991
3	22	September 28, 1991	July 23, 1992

== Episodes ==
=== Season 1 (1989–90) ===
No. overall	No. in season	Title	Directed by	Written by	Original release date
1	1	"The Kid"	Robert Lieberman	Ed Spielman	September 20, 1989
The riders of the Pony Express are tested by a bandit during their tutoring, and Kid finds out that Lou is a girl.
2	2	"Gunfighter"	Max Tash	Ed Spielman	September 21, 1989
Hickok believes a showdown with a gunfighter will resolve his childhood issues.
3	3	"Home of the Brave"	Dan Lerner	Dennis Cooper	September 28, 1989
Buck is torn between the express and his kinship with the Kiowa tribe.
4	4	"Speak No Evil"	John Johnston	Harv Zimmel	October 5, 1989
After Ike turns in the leader of a stagecoach massacre, the robber's gang attempt to kill Ike in order to prevent him from testifying.
5	5	"Bad Blood"	James A. Contner	Steven Baum	October 12, 1989
Lou goes to her old orphanage to pick up her brother and sister, only to learn that her estranged father, a gunrunner, has gotten to them first. The other riders then learn that Lou is a girl.
6	6	"Black Ulysses"	Bruce Kessler	Dennis Cooper	October 26, 1989
The riders protect a runaway slave from a group of militiamen.
7	7	"Ten-Cent Hero"	Kevin Hooks	Story by : Deidre Le Blanc; Teleplay by : Jonas McCord & Steven Baum	November 2, 1989
Hickok faces the consequences when a dime novelist creates the legendary "Wild Bill Hickok" and a gunfighter arrives for a showdown with "the fastest gun in the west."
8	8	"False Colors"	George Mendeluk	Raymond Hartung	November 9, 1989
Kid's brother Jed seems to have found a place in the Army, but he's actually leading a gang posing as a cavalry to steal gold for the growing Confederacy. Teaspoon and the gang explore the game of baseball.
9	9	"A Good Day to Die"	Virgil W. Vogel	Janet Himelstein	November 16, 1989
Kid finds a warrior at the scene of a way-station massacre and takes him to Sweetwater to face judgment, even though the warrior swears he did nothing wrong.
10	10	"The End of Innocence"	Virgil W. Vogel	Jacqueline Zambrano	November 30, 1989
Hickok realizes his feelings for Emma when they head to an Army outpost headed by a cruel captain.
11	11	"Blind Love"	Lee H. Katzin	Story by : Alan Levy; Teleplay by : Alan Levy & Steven Baum	December 7, 1989
Hickok falls for a woman who's bound to another man.
12	12	"The Keepsake"	Dan Attias	Story by : Richard Clayman; Teleplay by : Raymond Hartung	December 14, 1989
Teaspoon is given a claim to a small fortune, which he might lose to a woman he believes is his long-lost daughter and a crooked gambler willing to kill for it.
13	13	"Fall from Grace"	Virgil W. Vogel	Ed Spielman & Howard Spielman	January 4, 1990
After a falling-out with Teaspoon, Hickok gets involved with a gang of outlaws bent on robbing a store of Army guns and ammunition.
14	14	"Hard Time"	Virgil W. Vogel	Howard Spielman and Steven Baum	January 11, 1990
Kid is sentenced to hard time on a trumped-up charge by the sheriff of a small town being controlled by a sadistic man.
15	15	"Lady for a Night"	Virgil W. Vogel	Raymond Hartung	January 18, 1990
A vicious brute becomes obsessed with a feminine-dressed Louise as he plans a series of heists, while Hickok deals with an excruciatingly painful toothache.
16	16	"Unfinished Business"	George Mendeluk	Alan Levy	February 1, 1990
Emma's estranged husband survives a massacre and looks to her for shelter, raising the suspicions of Sam and the riders.
17	17	"Decoy"	Virgil W. Vogel	Tony Blake & Paul Jackson	February 8, 1990
Cody assists a wounded man while delivering a top-secret message. Back in Sweetwater, the other riders take care of an abandoned baby.
18	18	"Daddy's Girl"	George Mendeluk	Janet Himelstein	February 15, 1990
A new girl in town takes a shine to Buck, who is subsequently confronted with her tyrannical father and cruel suitor.
19	19	"Bulldog"	Joseph L. Scanlan	Steven Baum	February 22, 1990
An Eastern college boy looking forward to meeting Hickok is used as an unwitting accomplice in a scheme that puts the riders in danger.
20	20	"Matched Pair"	Virgil W. Vogel	Story by : Richard Clayman; Teleplay by : Raymond Hartung	March 8, 1990
Hickok helps an old rival look for their mentor's 'kidnapped' daughter, who's actually escaped with evidence of her father's corruption.
21	21	"The Man Behind the Badge"	Robert Totten	Christopher Thinnes & Deidre Le Blanc	March 22, 1990
Sam winds up on the wrong side of the law in his own hometown when the man who murdered his wife takes over Sweetwater.
22	22	"Then There Was One"	George Mendeluk	James L. Novack	April 5, 1990
Teaspoon heads to Texas with an old comrade in arms to warn three other veterans that someone is killing the last men who remember what really happened at the Alamo.
23	23	"Gathering Clouds: Part 1"	Lee H. Katzin	Story by : William Hasley; Teleplay by : Tony Blake & Paul Jackson	May 7, 1990
Kid is recruited to infiltrate a group of Southern guerillas led by a charasmatic Robin Hood.
24	24	"Gathering Clouds: Part 2"	Lee H. Katzin	Tony Blake & Paul Jackson	May 14, 1990
Kid escapes the noose, but the raiders are still amok, so Hickok works his way in their ranks.

=== Season 2 (1990–91) ===
No. overall	No. in season	Title	Directed by	Written by	Original release date
25	1	"Born to Hang"	George Mendeluk	Delle Chatman	September 22, 1990
Hickok and a freeborn man ride with a woman whose mission is to take freed slaves to Africa. Noah joins the riders, and Rachel is hired as well.
26	2	"Ghosts"	James Keach	Steven Baum	September 29, 1990
Rachel forms a bond with Lou, Teaspoon finally learns that Lou is a girl, while an outlaw stalks Teaspoon.
27	3	"Dead Ringer"	Virgil W. Vogel	Story by : Elaine Newman & Ed Burnham; Teleplay by : Raymond Hartung	October 6, 1990
A bank robber impersonates Hickok, who becomes the target of a bounty hunter bent on collecting the reward; meanwhile, what starts as a harmless prank leaves Cody thinking he's been cursed.
28	4	"Blood Moon"	Virgil W. Vogel	Christopher Thinnes & Deidre Le Blanc	October 13, 1990
The town experiences a cholera outbreak, but the bigger problem might be the fear among the townspeople.
29	5	"Pride and Prejudice"	Joseph L. Scanlan	Story by : Randy Holland; Teleplay by : Christopher Thinnes	October 27, 1990
After Buck guides the cavalry to a Sioux camp, he returns with a surprise for Tompkins - his wife and daughter.
30	6	"The Littlest Cowboy"	Virgil W. Vogel	Steven Baum	November 3, 1990
Ike lashes out over his handicap, until he meets a terminally ill boy who's passionate about life and eager to meet the riders.
31	7	"Blood Money"	Joseph L. Scanlan	Raymond Hartung	November 10, 1990
The riders investigate a corrupt marshal after a murder suspect Kid turned in hangs himself under suspicious circumstances.
32	8	"Requiem for a Hero"	Virgil W. Vogel	Bruce Reisman	November 17, 1990
Cody meets his idol Hezekiah Horn, who's grown disgusted by the development of the West and the violence of the Indian police. Kid and Lou have a romantic encounter.
33	9	"Bad Company"	Stephen L. Posey	James L. Novack	December 1, 1990
Hickok accidentally kills an innocent woman during a gunfight, leading him to look back on all his violent deeds.
34	10	"Star Light, Star Bright"	Joseph L. Scanlan	Raymond Hartung	December 15, 1990
It's Christmastime and a con man has promised the riders half a share in a gold mine.
35	11	"The Play's the Thing"	George Mendeluk	Story by : Gerritt Graham & Chris Hubbell; Teleplay by : Charles Grant Craig	December 29, 1990
Cody joins a troupe of traveling actors, unaware that they're actually Confederates out to assassinate General Fremont.
36	12	"Judgement Day"	Corey Blechman	Donald Marcus	January 5, 1991
Cody gets involved with bounty hunters who may be worse than their quarry, while Teaspoon falls under the spell of a vivacious women.
37	13	"Kansas"	Virgil W. Vogel	Story by : James Crite; Teleplay by : Steven Baum	January 12, 1991
Noah risks his life to save his old teacher from slavery, while Rachel deals with a card shark in Kansas.
38	14	"The Peacemakers"	James Keach	Charles Grant Craig	January 19, 1991
Hickok defends a religious group called the "Peacemakers" against the hostile citizens of a town where they plan to settle.
39	15	"Daisy"	Michael Preece	Steven Baum	February 2, 1991
Rachel is visited by an old lover, a small-time hustler on the run along with his precocious daughter.
40	16	"Color Blind"	Virgil W. Vogel	Delle Chatman	February 9, 1991
As Kid takes a shine to Sweetwater's new schoolteacher, Lou and Hickok's friendship grows while they go on a ride together, and Hickok saves Lou from an old adversary.
41	17	"Old Scores"	Guy Magar	Linda J. Cowgill	February 16, 1991
Ike believes he has seen one of the men responsible for his family's murder, even though the suspect now has a family of his own. The rest of the riders catch a loose camel that has scared some locals.
42	18	"The Talisman"	Virgil W. Vogel	Donald Marcus	February 23, 1991
A priest asks the riders for help in saving a village being terrorized by bandits.
43	19	"The Noble Chase"	Michael Preece	Christopher Thinnes	March 9, 1991
Hickok reluctantly teams up with his rival Jake Colter to hunt down a bank robber with a price on his head and a heart of gold.
44	20	"Face of the Enemy"	James Keach	Raymond Hartung	April 6, 1991
A young officer ridden with guilt accuses Buck of leading his men into a Crow ambush that exposed his cowardice.
45–46	21–22	"The Exchange"	Virgil W. Vogel	Charles Grant Craig	May 4, 1991
Amanda O'Connel, who is like a daughter to Teaspoon, is threatened by an outlaw bent on killing her (and Lou, who infiltrated the outlaw's hideout) if his brother is hanged.

=== Season 3 (1991–92) ===
No. overall	No. in season	Title	Directed by	Written by	Original release date
47	1	"A House Divided"	James Keach	Raymond Hartung	September 28, 1991
Kid and Hickok set out to rebuild an Express station allegedly destroyed by abolitionists near a town that stands between slave and free soil.
48	2	"Jesse"	James Keach	Charles Grant Craig	October 5, 1991
A young man named Jesse seeks revenge against a band of outlaws who murdered his guardian.
49	3	"The Blood of Others"	Aaron Lipstadt	James L. Novack	October 12, 1991
Lou, Hickok and Kid are tasked with bringing a long-sought outlaw to be hanged, but along the way, they discover he's more honorable than they thought.
50	4	"Between Rock Creek and a Hard Place"	Virgil W. Vogel	Joel J. Feigenbaum	October 26, 1991
Noah becomes the prime suspect in the murder of an unlikable Army recruiter.
51	5	"The Presence of Mine Enemies"	Michael Preece	Steven Baum	November 9, 1991
Ike meets a woman whose gambler father clashes with a dangerous cardshark.
52	6	"Survivors"	Richard Compton	Raymond Hartung	November 16, 1991
Cody falls for a widow who's involved with outlaws after becoming a mentor for her troubled son, while Buck struggles with grief over Ike's death.
53	7	"Initiation"	Virgil W. Vogel	Charles Grant Craig	November 25, 1991
Hickok rounds up a bank robber who's related to Jesse, while Cody helps city slickers take a walk on the wild side of the west.
54	8	"Just Like Old Times"	Lee H. Katzin	Steven Baum	November 30, 1991
Kid meets an old girlfriend whose husband gives him trouble, while the other riders plan to enter a competition.
55	9	"Spirits"	James Keach	Linda De Crane	December 7, 1991
Rachel falls for a division agent with a drinking problem.
56	10	"A Tiger's Tale"	Joseph L. Scanlan	Steven Baum	December 28, 1991
Cody and Noah attempt to deliver a tiger and meet nuns and a novitiate along the way; meanwhile, Jesse develops a crush on a certain girl.
57	11	"Good Night, Sweet Charlotte"	Michael Preece	Story by : Scott Shepherd & Sam Cooper; Teleplay by : Sam Cooper	January 4, 1992
Lou experiences bittersweet memories of an ex-prostitute who comes to Rock Creek to start over, while Hickok befriends a wounded Lakota Indian.
58	12	"The Song of Isiah"	Joseph L. Scanlan	Mark Rodgers	January 18, 1992
Affected by his sister's cause, Hickok finds himself riding with a band of abolitionists led by a man wanted for murder.
59	13	"Spies"	James Keach	Raymond Hartung	January 25, 1992
Kid gets mixed up in espionage, while Teaspoon plans to make Rachel the new schoolteacher.
60	14	"Shadowmen"	James Brolin	Story by : Todd Robinson; Teleplay by : Charles Grant Craig	May 21, 1992
A Pinkerton agent comes to Rock Creek in pursuit of a bank robber, while a damsel in distress attracts and distracts Teaspoon.
61	15	"Mask of Fear"	Cliff Bole	Story by : Karen Erbach; Teleplay by : Scott Shepherd & Charles Grant Craig	May 28, 1992
A Polish immigrant returns to Rock Creek after serving time for killing his wife, leading the townspeople to become a mob.
62	16	"Dark Brother"	Aaron Lipstadt	Todd Robinson	June 4, 1992
Buck sets out to save a sick friend, a white girl who was raised by the Kiowa.
63	17	"The Road Not Taken"	Raymond Hartung	Sam Cooper	June 11, 1992
Hickok has personal reasons to take down a killer, as Jesse learns when he tags along; meanwhile, Cody's magazine stories leave a few things to be desired.
64	18	"The Sacrifice"	Lee H. Katzin	Charles Grant Craig	June 25, 1992
Teaspoon and Hickok set out to restore order to a lawless town where Kid intends to spend more time with Lou. Eventually Kid proposes to Lou, and she accepts.
65	19	"Lessons Learned"	Guy Magar	Steven Baum	July 9, 1992
After his conviction is overturned, a killer seeks out his accusers, while Teaspoon's ex-wife pays a visit.
66	20	"The Debt"	Lee H. Katzin	James L. Novack	July 16, 1992
Hickok tracks a new rider who vanished in a town overrun by outlaws, while Lou sets out to buy a wedding dress.
67–68	21–22	"'Til Death Do Us Part"	James Keach	Part 1: Scott Shepherd & Charles Grant Craig; Part 2: Story by : Scott Shepherd & Charles Grant Craig; Teleplay by : Steven Baum	July 23, 1992
Lou and Kid prepare to get married as the Union begins to dissolve.
