= James Pax =

American actor

- Born: December 21, 1961 (age 64); United States
- Education: New York University
- Occupation: Actor
- Years active: 1985–present

James Pax (Born December 21, 1961) is an American actor who has acted in films produced in Hollywood, Hong Kong, and Japan. He was born to an English father and a Chinese mother.

== Career ==
Once Pax turned his attention to acting, he took on roles in Big Trouble in Little China with Kurt Russell, Year of the Dragon with John Lone, In Love and War with James Woods, Kinjite with Charles Bronson, and Bethune: The Making of a Hero with Donald Sutherland. He also guest starred in numerous television shows and appeared as a series regular on Nasty Boys in 1990. In 1992, he returned to Asia and started acting in the Hong Kong and Japanese movie industries. In 2003 he came to China for the filming of Shanghai Solution in Dalian. Pax appeared in Shanghai Solution, a true story based on the 30,000 Jews who fled to China in the 1940s, which aired on CCTV-8 in August 2005. He also starred in the Discovery Network program The First Emperor: The Man Who Made China in 2006 as Qin Shi Huang.

== Filmography ==
=== Film ===
Year	Title	Role
1985	Invasion U.S.A.	Koyo
1986	Big Trouble in Little China	Lightning
1989	Kinjite: Forbidden Subjects	Hiroshi Hada
1990	Bethune: The Making of a Hero	Mr. Tung
1993	The Heroic Trio	Inventor
1993	Shootfighter: Fight to the Death	Teng
1993	Love Among the Triad	Pak-Shek
1993	Crazy Hong Kong	Tony
1993	Lang xin ru tie	Billy Chan
1994	The Dragon Chronicles – The Maidens	Tai Hung
1995	Enemy Shadow	Panther
1995	Gates of Hell	Mr. Pax
1998	Love Kills	Rookie Cop #2

=== Television ===
Year	Title	Role	Notes
1986	Scarecrow and Mrs. King	Chien Chang	Episode: "Three Little Spies"
1986	T. J. Hooker	Makio	Episode: "Blood Sport"
1986	MacGyver	Stone	Episode: "The Wish Child"
1987	Shell Game	The Tiger	Episode: "Pai Gow"
1987	In Love and War	Rabbit	Television film
1987	Stingray	Captain	Episode: "Anytime, Anywhere"
1987	Tour of Duty	NVA Doctor	Episode: "Notes from the Underground"
1988	Matlock	Dr. Paul Liu	Episode: "The Genius"
1989	Nasty Boys	Jimmy Kee	Television film
1989	Man Against the Mob	Tommy Chaing	Television film
1990	Murder in Paradise	Jim Ishita	Television film
1990	Nasty Boys	Jimmy Kee	13 episodes
1997	Silk Stalkings	Quinn Chow	Episode: "Exit the Dragon"
1997	Nash Bridges	Bobby Wu	Episode: "Wild Card"
1999	Martial Law	Golden Dragon	Episode: "Painted Faces"
2000	Seven Days	The Interrogator / Ling Wu	Episode: "Deja Vu All Over Again"
2004	I'm Looking Forward to Being Loved	Zou Yifan	9 episodes
2006	The First Emperor	Emperor	Television documentary

=== Audio ===
Year	Title	Role	Notes
2025	The Temple of the Killer Tiger Monkeys	Mai Fu Ling	Podcast series
