= Nasty Boys (film) =

- Nasty Boys German VHS cover
- Genre: Crime drama
- Created by: Dick Wolf; David Black
- Teleplay by: Dick Wolf; David Black
- Story by: Dick Wolf
- Directed by: Rick Rosenthal
- Starring: William Russ; Whip Hubley; Benjamin Bratt; Don Franklin; Craig Hurley; Jeff Kaake; James Pax; Nia Peeples; Thomas Mikal Ford
- Music by: Basil Poledouris; Jimmy Jam; Terry Lewis

Production
- Executive producer: Dick Wolf
- Producers: Lynn Guthrie; Daniel Sackheim; Richard Wechsler; Victor Davich
- Cinematography: Roy H. Wagner, ASC
- Editor: Arthur W. Forney
- Running time: 100 minutes
- Production companies: Wolf Films; Universal Television

Original release
- Network: NBC
- Release: September 22, 1989

Nasty Boys is a 1989 American television pilot from NBC, about a North Las Vegas narcotic unit of six undercover police officers who fought crimes against drugs and illegal automatic weapons. It became a TV series in 1990.

== Production ==
The Nasty Boys pilot was created by Dick Wolf (who would later create Law & Order) and David Black.

The Nasty Boys pilot partial cast list included Thomas Mikal Ford as the lead villain Payday, T. Rodgers as Busy Bee, and Nia Peeples as Serena, wife of Eduardo Cruz (Benjamin Bratt).

Three years after playing "Hollywood" Neven in the film Top Gun, actor Whip Hubley starred in the Nasty Boys pilot as Matt Morrissey, a dual lead with Jeff Kaake who played the character Matt's brother, Paul Morrissey.
