= Knightwatch =

American drama television series

- Genre: Drama
- Created by: Kevin Rodney Sullivan
- Starring: Benjamin Bratt; Calvin Levels; Don Franklin; Paris Vaughan; Joshua Cadman
- Composer: Stanley Clarke
- Country of origin: United States
- Original language: English
- No. of seasons: 1
- No. of episodes: 9

Production
- Running time: 60 minutes
- Production companies: Astor III Productions; MGM/UA Television Productions

Original release
- Network: ABC
- Release: November 10, 1988 – January 19, 1989

Knightwatch is an American drama television series that aired on ABC from November 10, 1988 until January 19, 1989 as part of its fall 1988 lineup. It had been promoted as an original series in light of summer reruns continuing into the fall due to the 1988 Writers Guild of America Strike.

== Summary ==
Knightwatch centers around the activities of the "Knights of the City", a volunteer group set up to assist law enforcement. It was largely made up of ex-gang members (and was modeled after a similar real-life group, the Guardian Angels); the program focused on its charismatic leader, Tony Maldonado (Benjamin Bratt). Operating out of donated space in the basement of a church, the group practiced martial arts and other unarmed techniques since they were not commissioned police officers and did not use firearms. Keeping young people with violent pasts from reverting to this pattern in their new-found calling was a constant challenge to Tony, as were the interpersonal relationships constantly developing among his young colleagues.

Knightwatch was a Nielsen ratings failure. It struggled in its timeslot, airing against NBC's The Cosby Show and A Different World and CBS's 48 Hours. It was cancelled after 3 months on the air.

== Cast ==
- Benjamin Bratt as Tony Maldonado
- Don Franklin as Calvin Garvey
- Paris Vaughan as Leslie Chambers
- Joshua Cadman as Jason Snyder
- Ava Haddad as Casey Mitchell
- Calvin Levels as Mark 'Burn' Johnson
- Samantha Mathis as Jacquline 'Jake' Monroe
- Harley Jane Kozak as Barbara 'Babs' Shepard

== Episodes ==
No.	Title	Directed by	Written by	Original release date	U.S. viewers (millions)
1	"Knights of the City"	Unknown	Unknown	November 10, 1988	10.4
2	"Friday Knight"	Unknown	Unknown	November 17, 1988	10.3
3	"Codes"	Unknown	Unknown	December 1, 1988	9.1
4	"Knight Before Christmas"	Unknown	Unknown	December 8, 1988	8.8
5	"Hard Day's Knight"	Unknown	Unknown	December 15, 1988	6.9
6	"Repo Man Blues"	TBA	TBA	TBA	N/A
7	"Lost Weekend"	Unknown	Unknown	January 5, 1989	8.5
8	"Cops: Part 1"	Unknown	Unknown	January 12, 1989	9.2
9	"Cops: Part 2"	Unknown	Unknown	January 19, 1989	8.8
