= Trucker (film) =

- Theatrical release poster
- Directed by: James Mottern
- Written by: James Mottern
- Produced by: Celine Rattray; Galt Niederhoffer; Daniela Taplin Lundberg; Scott Hanson
- Starring: Michelle Monaghan; Nathan Fillion; Benjamin Bratt; Joey Lauren Adams; Jimmy Bennett
- Cinematography: Lawrence Sher
- Edited by: Deirdre Slevin
- Music by: Mychael Danna
- Production company: Plum Pictures
- Distributed by: Monterey Media (U.S.)
- Release date: April 23, 2008 (Tribeca Film Festival)
- Running time: 90 minutes
- Country: United States
- Language: English

Trucker is a 2008 independent drama film by Plum Pictures written and directed by James Mottern, and produced by Scott Hanson, Galt Niederhoffer, Celine Rattray and Daniela Taplin Lundberg. It stars Michelle Monaghan, Nathan Fillion and Benjamin Bratt.

== Plot ==
Diane Ford (Michelle Monaghan) is a long-haul truck driver. She spends her off time having one-night stands and drinking with her married neighbor, Runner (Nathan Fillion), who's in love with her. Her routine life is upset when her ex-husband Len (Benjamin Bratt) sends their 11-year-old son Peter (Jimmy Bennett) to stay with her while he is fighting against cancer.

== Cast ==
- Michelle Monaghan as Diane Ford
- Nathan Fillion as Runner
- Benjamin Bratt as Leonard "Len" Bonner
- Joey Lauren Adams as Jenny Bell
- Jimmy Bennett as Peter Bonner
- Bryce Johnson as Rick
- Matthew Lawrence as Scott
- Brandon Hanson as Tom
- Maya McLaughlin as Molly
- Ricky Ellison as Robert
- Johnny Simmons as Teenager 1
- Stephen Sowan as Teenager 2
- Dennis Hayden as Trucker
- Mika Boorem as Young Woman
- Franklin Dennis Jones as Jonnie
- Amad Jackson as Doctor

== Production ==
The film was shot on location in Hawthorne, CA, Bloomington, CA, and Mira Loma, CA. Other portions of the film were shot in the Coachella Valley, California.

Trucker had a reported budget of under $1.5 million.

Actress Michelle Monaghan earned her commercial driver's license so she could drive a semi-trailer truck for her role; the movie was shot using authentic footage of her doing so.

== Reception ==
On the review aggregator website Rotten Tomatoes, 58% of 36 critics' reviews are positive, with an average rating of 5.8/10. The website's consensus reads: "Excellent performances by Michelle Monaghan and Nathan Fillion and keenly-observed details of small town life elevate this otherwise predictable and inconsistent melodrama." Metacritic, which uses a weighted average, assigned the film a score of 61 out of 100, based on 13 critics, indicating "generally favorable" reviews.

Roger Ebert chose it as one of his top ten independent films for 2009.

== Awards ==
List of awards for the film:

- Michelle Monaghan – Excellence in Acting Award – Vail Film Festival
- Winner – Best Narrative Feature Film – Woods Hole Film Festival
- Official Selection Tribeca Film Festival
- Official Selection Austin Film Festival
- Official Selection Oxford Film Festival
- Official Selection Florida Film Festival
- Official Selection Vail Film Festival
- San Diego Film Critics: Best Actress (Michelle Monaghan)
