= Travis Fine =

American actor (born 1968)

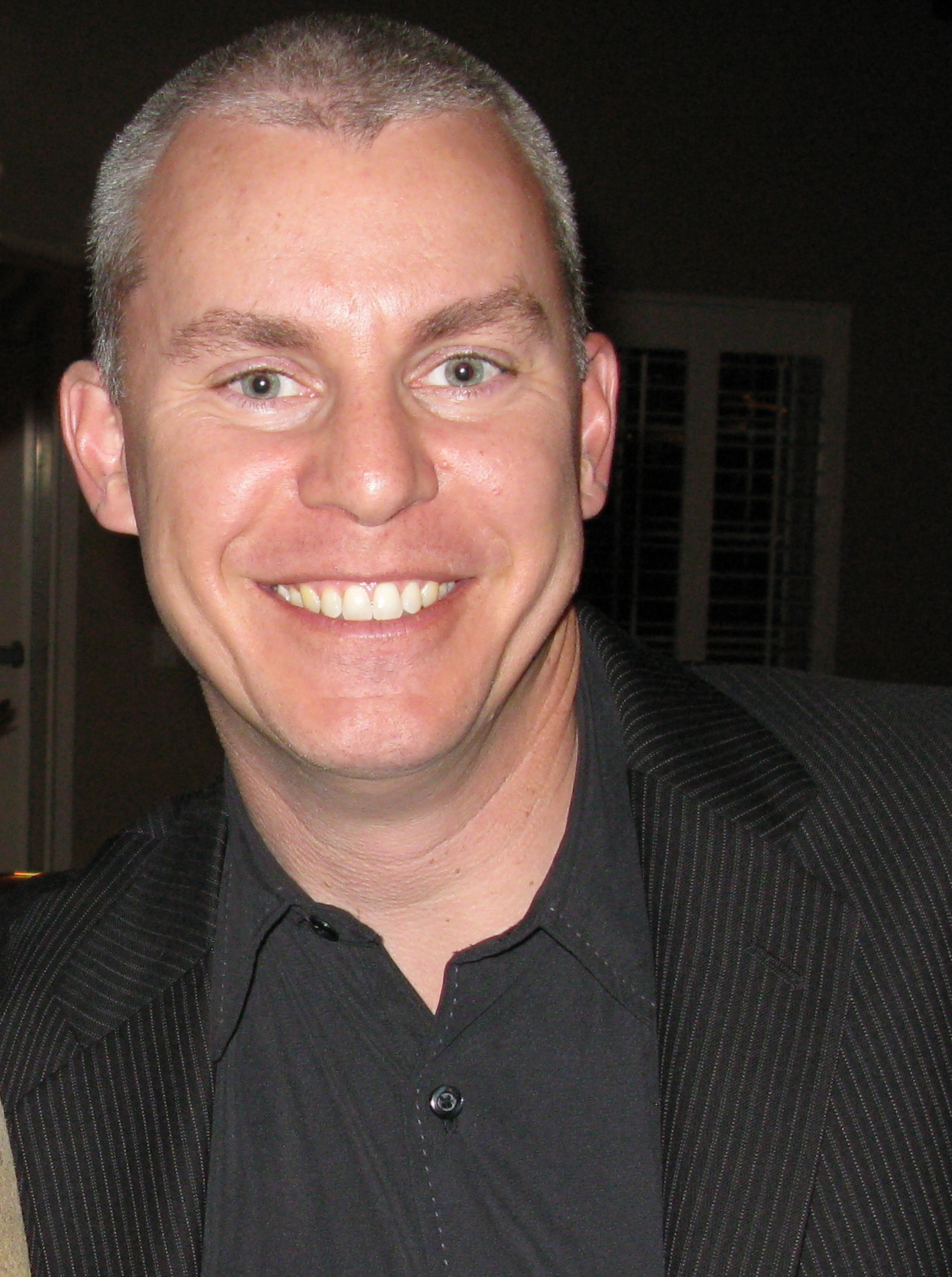
- Travis Fine (2009)
- Born: Travis Lane Fine; June 26, 1968 (age 58); Atlanta, Georgia, U.S.
- Occupations: Actor; writer; director; producer
- Years active: 1980–present
- Spouses: Jessica Resnick (m. 1993; div. 1995) Kristine Hostetter (m. 2002)

Travis Lane Fine (born June 26, 1968) is an American actor, writer, director and producer, perhaps best known for his film Any Day Now, and for his roles in Girl, Interrupted and The Young Riders.

== Early life ==
Fine was born in Atlanta, Georgia, the second son of Maxine Parker Makover and Terry Fine, a professional golfer. His parents divorced when he was six years old. At 15, he moved to Los Angeles. He went to Beverly Hills High School and attended Pitzer College for a year.

== Career ==
=== Acting career ===
Fine's acting career started at the age of seven when he was cast as John Henry in a stage production of Member of the Wedding at the Alliance Theatre in Atlanta. Over the next few years, he starred in theatre productions at the Alliance Theatre, the Children's Theatre Company in Minneapolis and at Beverly Hills High School, including stagings of A Christmas Carol, Peter Pan, Oliver!, Macbeth, Legend of Sleepy Hollow, On Golden Pond, Tom Sawyer, Grease, and Amadeus (in which he played Mozart). His on-screen debut came at the age of twelve in A Time for Miracles starring Lorne Greene.

In 1989, Fine gained attention as the mute and bald Pony Express rider Ike McSwain, on ABC's Western series The Young Riders.

In 2002, Fine started a new career in commercial aviation by attending ATP flight school. In 2003, he was hired as a first officer flying Embraer regional jets for Chatauqua Airlines, although he said he "ha[s] not ruled out doing more acting" and he continues writing screenplays.

=== Filmmaking career ===
Fine sold his first screenplay, The Lords of the Sea (written in 1994), to Howard Koch Jr., after which he was hired to write episodes for Diagnosis: Murder and Dr. Quinn, Medicine Woman. In 1996, he attended New York Film Academy, where he wrote, directed and produced several short films. A year later, he wrote, produced and directed his first feature-length film, The Others, a high school comedy.

In 2009, Fine wrote and directed The Space Between, starring Melissa Leo. In 2012 he co-wrote, produced and directed Any Day Now, an LGBT film set in the 1970s, starring Alan Cumming, Garret Dillahunt, Isaac Leyva, and Frances Fisher. Fine produced the film with his wife Kristine.

== Personal life ==
On Valentine's Day, 1993, Fine married Jessica Resnick. The couple divorced in 1995. On June 29, 2002, he married Kristine Fine (née Hostetter). He has two daughters, born in 1994 and 2004, and a son, born in 2007. Fine is Jewish and bisexual.

== Filmography ==
=== Film ===
Year	Title	Director	Writer	Role	Notes
1991	Child's Play 3	No	No	Lt. Col. Brett C. Shelton	
1994	Two Shows Daily	Yes	Yes		Short film
1994	Whisper in My Ear	Yes	Yes		Short film
1995	10:18	Yes	Yes		Short film
1997	The Others	Yes	Yes	VTV Cameraman	
1998	The Thin Red Line	No	No	Pvt. Weld	
1999	Girl, Interrupted	No	No	John	
1999	The Ride	Yes	Yes		
2000	We Married Margo	No	No	Basketball Friend	
2001	Jack the Dog	No	No	Buddy	
2001	Tomcats	No	No	Jan	
2010	The Space Between	Yes	Yes	Airline Pilot	
2012	Any Day Now	Yes	Yes		
2020	Two Eyes	Yes	Yes		

=== Television ===
Year	Title	Role	Notes
1987	Cagney & Lacey	Teenager #2	1 episode
1988	TV 101	Strange Looking Kid	1 episode
1989–1991	The Young Riders	Ike McSwain	51 episodes
1992	Cruel Doubt	James 'Moog' Upchurch	2 episodes
1992	Quantum Leap	Will Kinman	2 episodes
1993	They've Taken Our Children: The Chowchilla Kidnapping	Rick Schoenfeld	TV movie
1994	Menendez: A Killing in Beverly Hills	Erik Menendez	TV movie
1994	Diagnosis: Murder		Writing credit – 1 episode
1995	My Antonia	Harry Paine	TV movie
1995	Naomi & Wyonna: Love Can Build a Bridge	Michael Ciminella	TV movie
1996	The Lazarus Man	Frank	1 episode
1995–1997	JAG	Various roles	2 episodes
1997	The Pretender	Brian Stoffel	1 episode
1998	Vengeance Unlimited	Capt. Aaron McClane	1 episode
1999	Shake, Rattle and Roll: An American Love Story	Mookie Gilliland	TV movie
2000	The President's Man	Lieutenant	TV movie
2000	Lessons Learned		TV movie
2001	CSI: Crime Scene Investigation	Kenny Berlin	1 episode
2000–2001	Family Law	Tim Whitman	3 episodes
