= North Las Vegas Police Department =

Police department in North Las Vegas

North Las Vegas Police Department (NLVPD)
- North Las Vegas Police Department patch
- Common name: North Town Police, North Las Vegas Police
- Abbreviation: NLVPD
- Motto: "Committed to Excellence"

Agency overview
- Formed: 1946
- Employees: 398

Jurisdictional structure
- Operations jurisdiction: North Las Vegas, Nevada, United States
- Area: 100.48 mi (161.71 km)
- Population: 242,975 (2017)
- Legal jurisdiction: North Las Vegas, Nevada
- Governing body: Council-Manager
- General nature: Civilian police

Operational structure
- Headquarters: 2332 N. Las Vegas Blvd, North Las Vegas, NV 89030
- Police Officers: 292
- Civilians: 103
- Mayor of North Las Vegas responsible: Pamela Goynes-Brown
- Agency executives: Col . Jacqueline Gravatt, Chief of Police; Lt. Col Michael Harris, Assistant Chief of Police

Facilities
- Area Commands: 2
- Detention Centers: 1
- Dogs: 5

Website
- North Las Vegas Police Department Recruiting website

North Las Vegas Police Department (NLVPD) is the police department of the City of North Las Vegas in Clark County in southern Nevada.

Although North Las Vegas and Las Vegas are both within Clark County, and share city limit boundaries, NLVPD is not part of the larger Las Vegas Metropolitan Police Department, despite being part of the same metropolitan statistical area.

== History ==
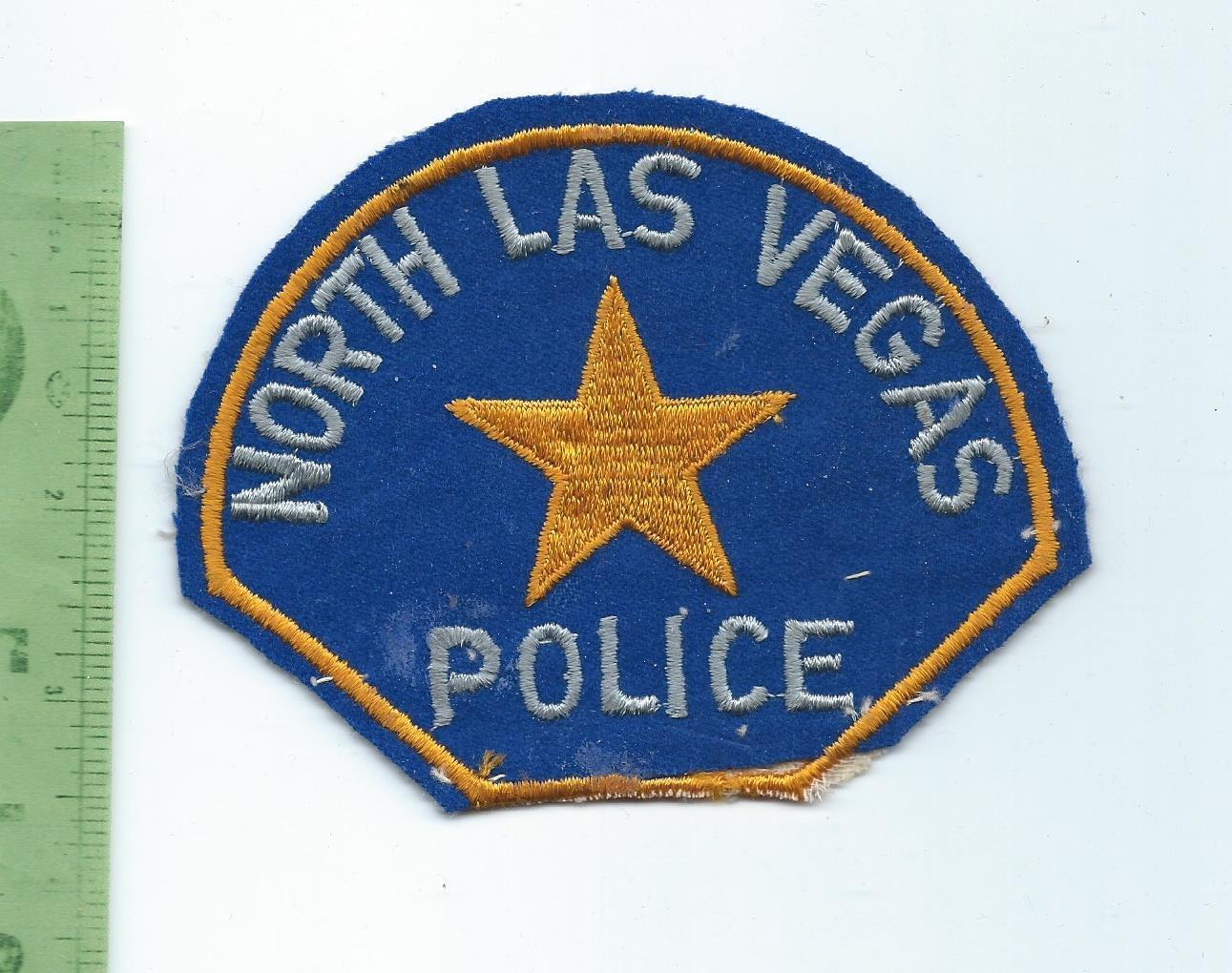
Original NLVPD patch

NLVPD was established in 1946 to serve the growing community of North Las Vegas, which at that time consisted of four square miles and had a population of around 3,000. Since then, NLVPD has grown dramatically to keep pace with the growth of North Las Vegas and the rest of Clark County.

As of 2016, NLVPD provided law enforcement services to an area of 100.48 square miles (260.2 km^{2}) and a population of approximately 233,808 citizens. As of July 2016, NLVPD had 309 commissioned personnel (Police and Detention Officers), and 106 civilian support personnel. The agency grew rapidly, adding 150 officers during the period 2006-2009. However, the number of personnel was reduced during the Great Recession.

In 2004 NLVPD created a website to promote recruiting, JoinNLVPD.com.

== Structure ==
The Department is led by a chief of police, who reports to the city manager.

Under the chief are one assistant chief, and four subordinate captains who run day-to-day department operations in three bureaus: Operations (2), Investigations, and Detention Services. A civilian deputy director manages Administrative Services.

- Operations Command is divided into two geographical area commands, operating from separate facilities. These are the Northwest Area Command (NWAC) and the South Area Command (SAC). The Traffic Division also belongs to the Operations Command.
- Investigative Command includes the Detective Bureau, Crime Scene Investigations Bureau, Special Weapons and Tactics (SWAT), Problem-Solving Unit (PSU), K-9 Unit, and Narcotics Investigations Division.
- Detention Command Detention services are conducted at the Las Vegas city jail in a shared services agreement. 48 NLVPD employees work in that facility.
- Administrative Command includes the Communications Division (911 emergency dispatch), Animal Control Division, Resource Management Division, Community Services Division, Records Division, Validations Office, the Victim Witness Program, and Police Department Training Division.

The Special Assignments Unit (SAU) includes the Public Communications Office (public information officer, recruiting), and Field Training and Evaluation Program (FTEP). The SAU is supervised by a sworn police supervisor who reports to the Chief of Police.

=== Ranks ===
Title	Insignia
Chief	
Assistant Chief	
Captain	
Lieutenant	
Sergeant	
Detective	
Officer	

== Other programs ==
- Chief's Advisory Council
- Línea Comunitaria Latina (Latino Community Connection)
- Citizens' Academy
- Explorer Program
- Citizen's Patrol

== Line of duty deaths ==
As of 2025, 4 officers of the North Las Vegas Police Department have been killed in the line of duty.

== In popular culture ==
The Department has been portrayed in reality television programs such as Fugitive Strike Force and COPS. It was also the inspiration for the short-lived television series Nasty Boys.
