= Benjamin Bratt =

American actor (born 1963)

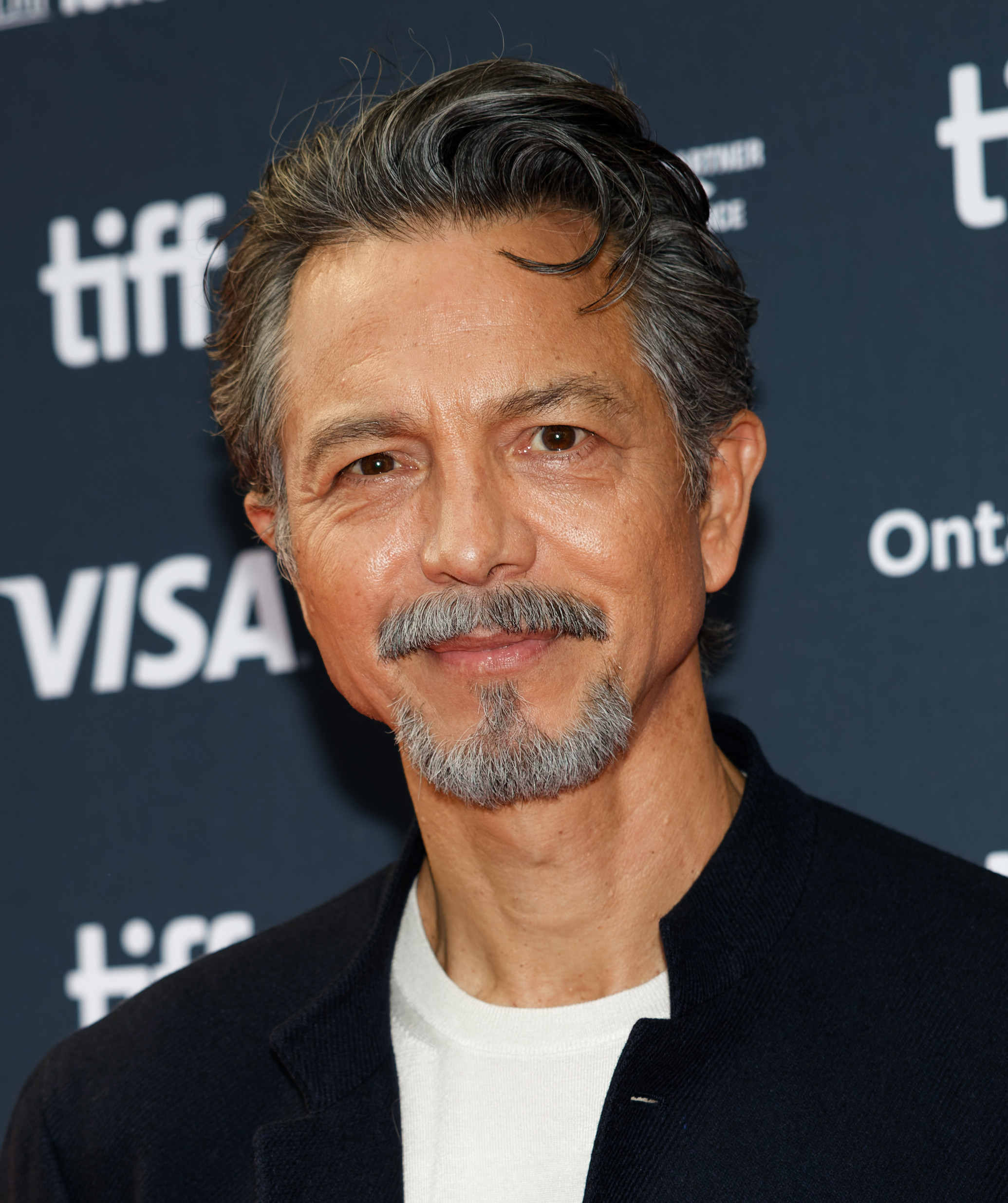
- Bratt at the 2024 Toronto International Film Festival
- Born: December 16, 1963 (age 62); San Francisco, California, U.S.
- Education: University of California, Santa Barbara (BFA); American Conservatory Theater
- Occupation: Actor
- Years active: 1987–present
- Spouse: Talisa Soto (m. 2002)
- Children: 2
- Relatives: Kauchani Bratt (nephew)

Benjamin Bratt (born December 16, 1963) is an American actor. He is known for playing Paco Aguilar in Blood in Blood Out. He had supporting film roles in the 1990s in Demolition Man (1993), Clear and Present Danger (1994) and The River Wild (1994). From 1995 to 1999, he starred as NYPD Detective Reynaldo Curtis on the NBC drama series Law & Order, for which he received a nomination for the Primetime Emmy Award for Outstanding Supporting Actor in a Drama Series.

In the 2000s, Bratt appeared in Miss Congeniality (2000), Traffic (2000), Piñero (2001), Catwoman (2004), Trucker (2008), and Snitch (2013), among other films. On television, Bratt has portrayed Dr. Jake Reilly on ABC's Private Practice (2011–2013), Steve Navarro on 24: Live Another Day (2014), Jahil Rivera on Star (2016–2018) and Senator Bail Organa on Andor (2025). He has also done voice acting in the Cloudy with a Chance of Meatballs film franchise (2009–2013), Despicable Me 2 (2013) and the Coco film franchise (2017-2029).

== Early life and education ==
Bratt was born on December 16, 1963, in San Francisco, California the third of five children of Eldy (née Banda), a nurse and political activist, and Peter Bratt Sr., a sheet metal worker. His mother was born in Lima, Peru, and is of Quechua descent. She moved to the United States with her family at age 14. His father has English, German, and Austrian ancestry. His paternal grandfather, George, was a Broadway actor.

An activist for Native American rights, Bratt's mother took Bratt, age six, and her other children to participate in the 1969 Native American occupation of Alcatraz. Led by young people from San Francisco, it raised national awareness of issues facing Native Americans and attracted participants from across the country.

Bratt attended Lowell High School in San Francisco, where he was a member of the Lowell Forensic Society. Bratt earned a B.F.A. at the University of California, Santa Barbara in 1986, where he joined the Lambda Chi Alpha fraternity. Enrolled in the M.F.A. program at the American Conservatory Theater in San Francisco, he left before receiving his degree to star in the 1988 television film Juarez.

== Career ==
=== Early work ===
Bratt started his professional acting career at the Utah Shakespeare Festival, where he played supporting roles in Much Ado About Nothing, Richard III and The Comedy of Errors during their 1987 season. He starred in the 1988 television film Juarez which received critical acclaim. He then landed a supporting role in the television film Police Story: Gladiator School. He had his first film role as Esteban in Lovers, Partners & Spies, which did not perform well at the box office. Bratt worked extensively in television, with roles in the Knightwatch and Nasty Boys series. In 1989, he starred in the film Nasty Boys, based on the television series.

=== Hollywood breakthrough and success ===
After several low-budget films and television films, including One Good Cop and Shadow Hunter, in 1993, Bratt appeared in two Hollywood films. He portrayed a gang member turned LAPD officer named Paco Aguilar in Blood in Blood Out, and Officer Alfredo Garcia in Demolition Man. The following year, he played supporting roles in the popular films The River Wild, Clear and Present Danger, and James A. Michener's Texas.

Returning to television, he played Detective Reynaldo Curtis in the series Law & Order replacing Chris Noth, which gained him international recognition. He reprised the role in Homicide: Life on the Street and Exiled: A Law & Order Movie. For his role, he received three American Latino Media Arts Awards, three Screen Actors Guild Awards nominations, and a Primetime Emmy Award nomination.

In 1999, Bratt decided to leave Law & Order. "I've felt like it was time to get back home to my family," Bratt said. "How do you walk away from the best job in the world and a group of people that you've grown to love? It's not easy, and it was an extremely difficult decision that I had to make." On May 26, 1999, Bratt's final episode was aired. In 2009, Bratt returned as the now-retired Curtis on Law & Order, where he was reunited with his former boss, Lt. Anita Van Buren (S. Epatha Merkerson), in the episode that aired on December 11, 2009. He returned to his film career that same year.

=== Later work ===
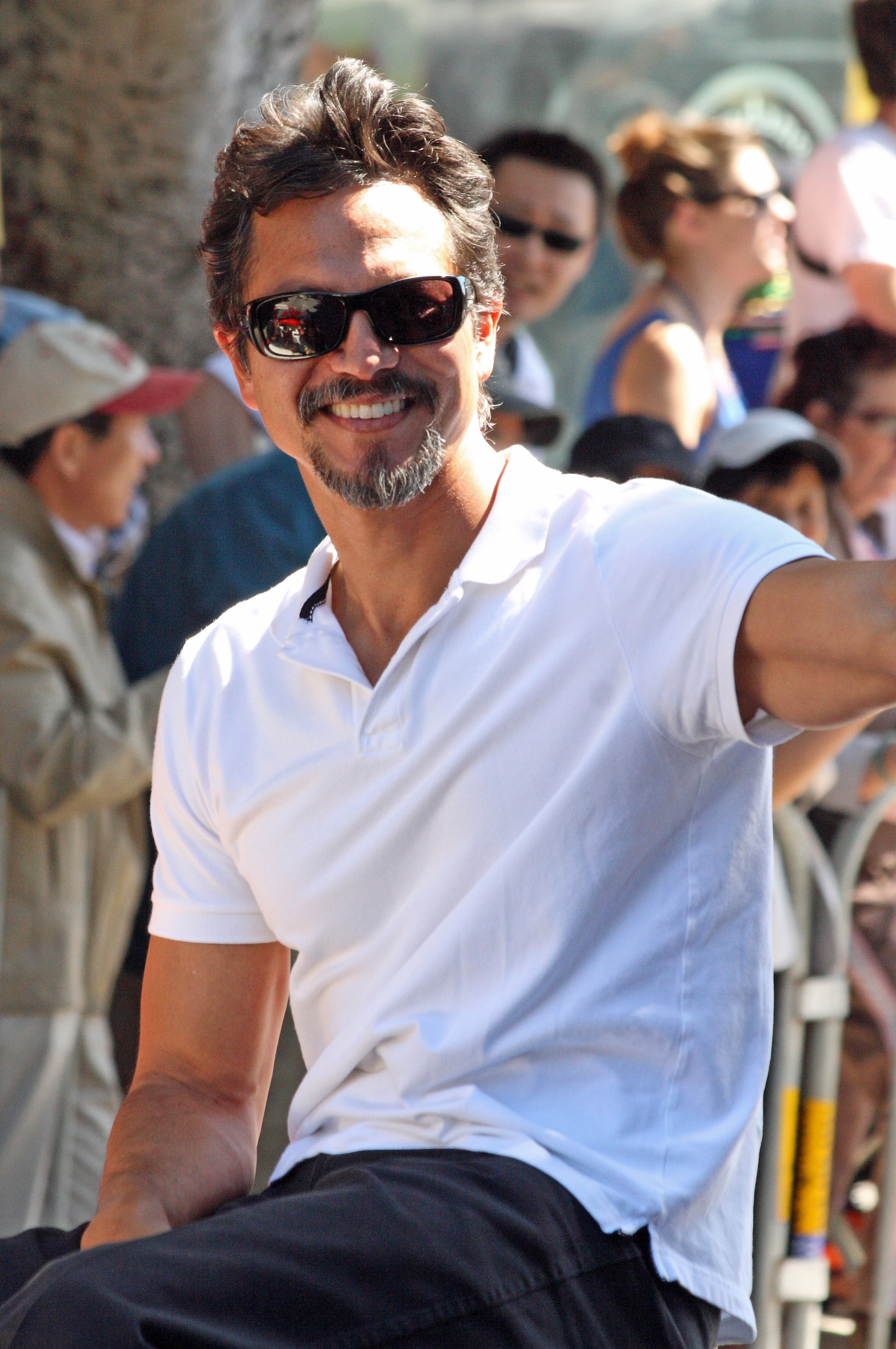
Bratt at the 2010 Carnaval San Francisco

In 2000, Bratt appeared in The Next Best Thing. That same year, he played opposite Sandra Bullock in the romantic comedy Miss Congeniality and had a small role in the ensemble work Traffic. In 2004, the actor co-starred in Catwoman. Bratt often portrays Hispanic characters, especially in his later work. Bratt said, "I've played 'Latin-looking spiv, third from the right’ so many times I can't count." In 2001, he starred in the biopic film Piñero, for which he received an American Latino Media Arts Award for Outstanding Actor in a Motion Picture. He played Puerto Rican actor and poet Miguel Piñero. Piñero was bisexual and when talking about Bratt having to portray his bisexuality, Bratt stated that this was "certainly something I wasn't afraid of." He went on to say, "Whether you're talking about Miguel's sexuality or his time spent in jail or his petty crime or his drug addiction, each one of those things is a component that makes up the entirety of the man." In 2009, Bratt performed in The People Speak, a documentary feature film that uses dramatic and musical performances of the letters, diaries, and speeches of everyday Americans, based on historian Howard Zinn's A People's History of the United States. That year he starred in and produced the film La Mission, directed by his brother, Peter Bratt. His later films include The Woodsman, Thumbsucker, The Great Raid, Trucker, Snitch, Ride Along 2, The Infiltrator, and Doctor Strange.

Bratt has appeared in several television shows since 2000, including starring as William Banks in The Cleaner, Dr. Jake Reilly in Private Practice, and Jahil Rivera on Star. He appeared in such series as Frasier, Modern Family, 24: Live Another Day, DMZ, and Poker Face.

Bratt has been featured in several animated feature films, which include El Macho, the main antagonist of Despicable Me 2. He played Manny the cameraman in Cloudy with a Chance of Meatballs and reprised his role in its sequel Cloudy with a Chance of Meatballs 2. Also, in 2015, he voiced Superman in Justice League: Gods and Monsters. In the 2017 film Coco, Bratt voiced Ernesto de la Cruz, the main antagonist of the film who was a Mexican folk legend and the idol of the film's main protagonist, Miguel. Bratt sings "Remember Me", a song in the film that is sung by many other characters throughout and won Best Original Song at the 2018 Academy Awards and the film won Best Animated Feature.

In 2025, Bratt joined the cast of the Disney+ Star Wars series Andor for its second season, portraying Senator Bail Organa, who had previously been played by Jimmy Smits in prior Star Wars productions.

== Activism and philanthropy ==
Bratt has been active in the American Indian Movement and supports such causes as the American Indian College Fund.

He narrated We Shall Remain (2009), a PBS miniseries about Native Americans, and part of its American Experience.

Bratt has supported and served as a board member of the San Francisco Bay Area's Friendship House Association of American Indians and the Native American Health Center. Bratt also has supported area organizations such as the Tribal Athletics Program, and United Indian Nations.

In 2002, Bratt and Priscilla López received the Rita Moreno Award for Excellence from the Hispanic Organization of Latin Actors (HOLA).

In 2017, Bratt served as consulting producer for the film Dolores, which explores the life of Dolores Huerta, an American labor leader and civil rights activist. The film received critical acclaim and several awards.

In 2023, Bratt co-executive produced Wings of Dust, a documentary about water contamination in the Peruvian community of Espinar.

== Personal life ==
From 1998 to 2001, Bratt dated actress Julia Roberts.

In 2002, he began dating actress and former Bond girl Talisa Soto; they married on April 13 in San Francisco. The two had met ten years earlier during a casting audition. During the filming of Piñero (2001) they began to develop a relationship. Their first child, a daughter, was born on December 6, 2002; their second child, a son, was born on October 3, 2005.

In 2024, Bratt was awarded an honorary doctorate by San Francisco State University.

== Filmography ==
=== Film ===
Key
†	Denotes films that have not yet been released

Year	Title	Role	Notes
1988	Lovers, Partners & Spies	Esteban	
1990	Bright Angel	Claude	
1991	One Good Cop	Detective Felix	
1991	Chains of Gold	Carlos	
1993	Blood in Blood Out	Paco Aguilar	
1993	Demolition Man	Officer Alfredo Garcia	
1994	Clear and Present Danger	Captain Ramírez	
1994	The River Wild	Ranger Johnny	
1996	Follow Me Home	Abel	Also producer
2000	The Next Best Thing	Ben Cooper	
2000	The Last Producer	Damon Black	
2000	Red Planet	Lieutenant Ted Santen	
2000	Miss Congeniality	FBI Agent Eric Matthews	
2000	Traffic	Juan Obregón	
2001	Piñero	Miguel Piñero	
2002	Abandon	Detective Wade Handler	
2004	The Woodsman	Carlos	
2004	Catwoman	Detective Tom Lone	
2005	Thumbsucker	Matt Schramm	
2005	The Great Raid	Lieutenant Colonel Henry Mucci	
2007	Love in the Time of Cholera	Dr. Juvenal Urbino	
2008	Trucker	Leonard 'Len' Bonner	
2009	Cloudy with a Chance of Meatballs	Manny (voice)	
2009	The People Speak	Himself	
2009	La Mission	Che Rivera	Also producer
2013	Snitch	Juan Carlos 'El Topo' Pintera	
2013	The Lesser Blessed	Jed	
2013	Despicable Me 2	Eduardo Pérez / El Macho (voice)	
2013	Cloudy with a Chance of Meatballs 2	Manny (voice)	
2015	Justice League: Gods and Monsters	Lor-Zod / Hernan Guerra / Superman (voice)	
2016	Ride Along 2	Antonio Pope	
2016	Special Correspondents	John Baker	
2016	The Infiltrator	Roberto Alcaino	
2016	Doctor Strange	Jonathan Pangborn	
2017	Shot Caller	Sheriff Manny Sanchez	
2017	Coco	Ernesto de la Cruz (voice)	
2017	Dolores	—N/a	Consulting producer
2019	A Score to Settle	Q / San Quentin	
2020	Best Summer Ever	Daphne's Dad	
2022	Wings of Dust	—N/a	Short film; executive producer
2022	Dead for a Dollar	Tiberio Vargas	
2024	Mother of the Bride	Will Jackson	
2024	Millers in Marriage	Johnny	
2026	Balls Up	Señor Santos	
TBA	Ally Clark †		Post-production

=== Television ===
Year	Title	Role	Notes
1987	Juarez	Sergeant Rosendo Juarez	Television film
1988	Police Story: Gladiator School	Officer Dave Ramirez	Television film
1988–1989	Knightwatch	Tony Maldonado	9 episodes
1989	Nasty Boys	Eduardo Cruz	Television film
1989–1990	Nasty Boys	Eduardo Cruz	Main role
1990	Capital News	Carlos Torres	Episode: "Pilot"
1993	Shadowhunter	Nakai Twobear	Television film
1994	Texas	Benito Garza	Television film
1995–2009	Law & Order	Detective Reynaldo "Ray" Curtis	Main role (seasons 6–9); guest role (season 20)
1996	Late Night with Conan O'Brien	Detective Reynaldo "Ray" Curtis	Episode: "Jim Breuer/Matt Frewer/Spacehog"
1996	Woman Undone	Jim Mercer	Television film
1996–1999	Homicide: Life on the Street	Detective Reynaldo "Ray" Curtis	3 episodes
1998	Exiled: A Law & Order Movie	Detective Reynaldo "Ray" Curtis	Television film
2001	After the Storm	Arno	Television film
2003	Frasier	Kevin (voice)	Episode: "The Doctor Is Out"
2005–2006	E-Ring	Lieutenant Colonel Jim Tisnewski	Main role
2008	The Andromeda Strain	Dr. Jeremy Stone	2 episodes
2008–2009	The Cleaner	William Banks	Main role; also producer
2009	American Experience	Narrator	3 episodes
2010–2020	Modern Family	Javier Delgado	Recurring role
2011–2013	Private Practice	Dr. Jake Reilly	Main role
2014	24: Live Another Day	Steve Navarro	Miniseries
2015	Justice League: Gods and Monsters Chronicles	Lor-Zod / Hernan Guerra / Superman (voice)	Episode: "Bomb"
2016–2018	Star	Jahil Rivera	Main role
2021	Soul of a Nation	—N/a	Episode: "Soul of a Nation Presents: Corazón de América – Celebrating Hispanic Culture"; director
2022	DMZ	Parco Delgado	TMiniseries
2023	Poker Face	Cliff LeGrand	5 episodes
2023	Skull Island	Cap (voice)	Recurring role
2024	Loot	Himself	Episode: "Mr. Congeniality"
2025	Andor	Bail Organa	3 episodes
TBA	The Land		Recurring role

=== Video games ===
Year	Title	Role	Notes
2026	Disney Speedstorm	Ernesto de la Cruz (voice)	
2027	Kingdom Hearts IV	Ernesto de la Cruz (voice)	English version

== Awards and nominations ==
Year	Award	Category	Work	Result	Ref.
1996	NCLR Bravo Awards	Outstanding Actor in a Drama Series	Law & Order	Nominated	
1997	Screen Actors Guild Awards	Outstanding Performance by an Ensemble in a Drama Series	Law & Order	Nominated	
1998	Screen Actors Guild Awards	Outstanding Performance by an Ensemble in a Drama Series	Law & Order	Nominated	
1998	American Latino Media Arts Awards	Outstanding Actor in a Drama Series	Law & Order	Won	
1999	Screen Actors Guild Awards	Outstanding Performance by an Ensemble in a Drama Series	Law & Order	Nominated	
1999	American Latino Media Arts Awards	Outstanding Actor in Made-for-Television Movie or Mini-Series	Exiled: A Law & Order Movie	Won	
1999	American Latino Media Arts Awards	Outstanding Actor in a Drama Series	Law & Order	Won	
1999	Primetime Emmy Awards	Outstanding Supporting Actor in a Drama Series	Law & Order	Nominated	
2001	Screen Actors Guild Awards	Outstanding Performance by a Cast in a Motion Picture	Traffic	Won	
2001	Golden Raspberry Awards	Worst Screen Combo	The Next Best Thing (shared with Madonna)	Nominated	
2001	Blockbuster Entertainment Awards	Favorite Supporting Actor – Comedy	Miss Congeniality	Won	
2002	American Latino Media Arts Awards	Outstanding Actor in a Motion Picture	Piñero	Won	
2002	Hispanic Organization of Latin Actors Awards	Rita Moreno Award for Excellence		Won	
2005	Golden Raspberry Awards	Worst Screen Combo	Catwoman (shared with Halle Berry)	Nominated	
2009	Imagen Awards	Best Actor/Television	The Cleaner	Nominated	
2009	PRISM Awards	Performance in a Drama Multi-Episode Storyline	The Cleaner	Nominated	
2009	American Latino Media Arts Awards	Year in TV Drama – Actor	The Cleaner	Won	
2010	Imagen Awards	Best Actor – Film	La Mission	Won	
2010	Oaxaca FilmFest	Best Actor	La Mission	Won	
2012	American Latino Media Arts Awards	Favorite TV Actor – Drama	Private Practice	Nominated	
2012	Red Nation Film Festival	Outstanding Supporting Actor in Television Mini-Series/MOW/Television Show	Private Practice	Nominated	
2013	Imagen Awards	Best Actor/Television	Private Practice	Nominated	
2019	News and Documentary Emmy Awards	Outstanding Business and Economic Documentary	Dolores	Nominated	
2022	Imagen Awards	Best Supporting Actor – Drama (Television)	DMZ	Nominated	
2023	Imagen Awards	Best Supporting Actor – Comedy (Television)	Poker Face	Won	
2024	Hollywood Critics Association Awards	Best Supporting Actor in a Streaming Comedy Series	Poker Face	Nominated	
