= Fast Forward (film) =

1985 film directed by Sidney Poitier

- Theatrical poster
- Directed by: Sidney Poitier
- Written by: Timothy March; Richard Wesley
- Produced by: Melville Tucker; John Veitch
- Starring: John Scott Clough; Don Franklin
- Cinematography: Matthew F. Leonetti
- Edited by: David E. Blewitt; Harry Keller; Art Seid
- Music by: Tom Bähler; Jack Hayes; Tom Scott
- Production companies: Columbia Pictures; Delphi III Productions; Verdon-Cedric Productions
- Distributed by: Columbia Pictures
- Release date: February 15, 1985
- Running time: 113 minutes
- Country: United States
- Language: English
- Box office: $2,791,350

Fast Forward is a 1985 dance film directed by Sidney Poitier. In the film, a dance troupe from Ohio comes to New York to compete in a national talent competition.

== Plot ==
"The Adventurous Eight," a group of singing and dancing teenagers from Sandusky, Ohio, crave stardom so badly that they spend their spare time rehearsing original songs and dance routines every day after school. The group has eight members: Matt, Michael, June, Debbie, Rita, Francine, Meryl and Valerie.

A tacit promise of an audition from Mr. Sabol, a well-known dance executive, leads them to New York city, which they are not able to reach before he dies. At his company headquarters, the group gets a meeting with the new CEO, Clem Friedkin. Friedkin tells them the show they arrived to perform in has been postponed for three weeks and he doubts they would make it past the first round. After being pressed by the group, Friedkin promises that if they are still in town when he returns in three and a half weeks, he will give them five minutes to audition.

The group agrees to do whatever it takes to stay in town. After three days of cleaning the filthy apartment they can afford, they want to eat more than fast food. Matt comes up with a plan to eat steak that night: dancing for tips in a fancy restaurant. The number goes off well, and they get to sit around and eat.

Over the next couple of weeks, the Adventurous Eight continue to raise money by passing out business cards while dancing in front of crowds in hopes of getting paying gigs. They land a gig at famous dance club The Zoo, where they run into a rival dance crew who is more street savvy and dances rings around them. Furious, Michael demands they learn more current dance moves, so they are never shown up again. They also need to do that to be ready for the contest.

Furthering their issues, the male tenants of the building keep harassing the female members of the group, and one of the girls breaks a car window fighting them off. Two of their parents are called to get them out of jail. After some pleading, they allow their daughters to stay until the contest is over. Matt finds himself tempted by Susan, a young woman who hires the group to dance for a party she is tasked with coordinating. After their performance at the party, she pulls Matt away from the rest of the group to pay him and the two start making out. He fails to wipe her lipstick off and, after a heated argument, his girlfriend June decides to leave the group and return to Sandusky. The rest of the girls convince her to stay during a late night out drinking.

Michael asks Matt if he thinks they are ready for the contest and they agree they are, but they have something to do first. They return to The Zoo and challenge the rival dance crew, this time coming out on top with their new dance moves. However, when they return to see Friedkin, he refuses to give them the audition because Susan's mother made a call. They find Mrs. Sabol and convince her to assist them in getting into the contest (she calls Susan's mother for a reference and gives them a shot since they have never agreed on anything) after she sees them perform. Later, she goes to see Friedkin and discovers he has rigged the contest in favor of pre-selected entertainers who are guaranteed to make a lot of money for the company.

After returning to the apartment, she convinces the group to take a chance with her and allow her to be their manager. The night of the contest, she disguises herself to get in and brings the group. She then contacts her people to get them on stage. Matt tells June he's going to leave the group. She thinks he is lying and doing it for Susan, but Michael divulges that Susan married her boyfriend after using Matt to make him jealous. The group gets on stage and performs successfully. Meanwhile, Mrs. Sabol informs Friedkin that she is going to begin taking back control of her company. Matt and June reconcile then brings Mrs. Sabol on stage crediting her, before the group performs an encore.

== Cast ==
- John Scott Clough - Matt Sherman
- Don Franklin - Michael Stafford
- Tamara Mark - June Wolsky
- Tracy Silver - Meryl Stanton
- Cindy McGee - Francine Hackett
- Gretchen F. Palmer - Valerie Thompson
- Monique Cintron - Rita Diaz
- Debra Varnado - Debbie Hughes
- Irene Worth - Ida Sabol
- Sam McMurray - Clem Friedkin
- Karen Kopins - Susan Granger
- Constance Towers - Jessie Granger
- Michael DeLorenzo - Caesar Lopez

== Soundtrack ==
The soundtrack album was released on Qwest Records following the release of the film. A music video for the modest hit "Do You Want it Right Now" by Siedah Garrett was produced. The song reached #3 on the US Hot Dance Music/Club Play and #63 on the US R&B Charts. Quincy Jones and Tom Bahler acted as executive producers of the album.

Track listing:

1. "Breakin' Out" - Kip Lennon – 3:06 (M. Vieha/J. Ingram/O.E. Brown/B. Walsh). Produced by Mark Vieha and Brock Walsh.
2. "Do You Want it Right Now" - Siedah Garrett – 5:36 (C. Burton/N. Straker). Produced by John "Jellybean" Benitez.
3. "Long as We Believe" - Siedah Garrett and David Swanson – 4:06 (P. Glass/N.M. Walden/W. Afanasieff/T. Bahler/S. Garrett). Produced by Narada Michael Walden.
4. "Curves" - Siedah Garrett – 5:00 (P. Glass/N.M. Walden). Produced by Narada Michael Walden.
5. "Taste" - Siedah Garrett and David Swanson – 5:28 (D. Swanson/S. Garrett). Produced by Narada Michael Walden.
6. "Showdown" - Pulse featuring Adele Bertei – 5:43 (Jellybean/S. Bray/Toni C.). Produced by John "Jellybean" Benitez.
7. "Survive" - Kip Lennon – 3:40 (T. Bahler/B. Walsh). Produced by Brock Walsh.
8. "Fast Forward" - Kip Lennon – 4:01 (B. Walsh/T. Bahler/J. Van Tongeren/B. Hull). Produced by Brock Walsh.

== See also ==
- List of American films of 1985
