= Nasty Boys (TV series) =

- Created by: Dick Wolf; David Black
- Developed by: Victor N. Davich; Richard Wechsler
- Starring: Don Franklin; Jeff Kaake; Benjamin Bratt; Craig Hurley; Nia Peeples; Dennis Franz; James Pax; Sandy McPeak
- Opening theme: "Nasty" performed by Lisa Keith
- Composer: Basil Poledouris
- Country of origin: United States
- Original language: English
- No. of seasons: 1
- No. of episodes: 13

Production
- Running time: 60 minutes
- Production companies: Wolf Films; Universal Television

Original release
- Network: NBC
- Release: February 19 – May 18, 1990

Nasty Boys is an American action drama television series based on the real life Narcotics Officers of the North Las Vegas Police Department. It follows the 1989 film Nasty Boys and aired on NBC from February 19 to May 18, 1990.

== Overview ==
The innovative cops were known locally as the NTNB which stood for the North Town Narcotics Bureau but quickly were nicknamed the North Town "Nasty Boys" by the local drug dealers because of the unit's all black hooded raid uniforms and their quick breaching methods for serving search warrants. The unit caught the attention of the producers of "The Reporters" while they were in Las Vegas for an unrelated show. It was the practice of the unit at the time to allow the local press to ride with them and tape their raids and "Reversals", that's where the cops take over a drug sales location and then pretend to be the drug sellers busting the arriving buyers one by one. Then with the help of the local NBC affiliate would air the bust on the 11:00 p.m. news with the opening, "The Nasty Boys shut down another drug sales location at ..." The Reporters aired a segment showcasing the Nasty Boys serving warrants and speaking their "Say No To Drugs" presentation to local adult and children's organizations.

Two of the undercover narcotics officers, Jimmy Jackson and Larry Bradley, began the anti-drug presentations with a rap song, BUSTED, written by Bradley and sung by three of them. This was followed by T-shirts that read, "BUSTED by the Nasty Boys" and another showing a photo of the hooded team with the caption "We Make House Calls!". The NBC affiliate KVBC produced several award-winning anti-drug Public Service Announcements that featured real-life footage of the Nasty Boys making busts, one of which shows the North Las Vegas Chief of Police looking into the camera, with the heavily armed team behind him, saying, "If you sell drugs in North Las Vegas, we'll be knocking at your door."

== Cast ==
- Don Franklin as Alex Wheeler
- Benjamin Bratt as Eduardo Cruz
- Craig Hurley as Danny Larsen
- James Pax as Jimmy Kee
- Jeff Kaake as Paul Morrissey
- Dennis Franz as Lieutenant Stan Krieger
- Nia Peeples as Serena Cruz
- Sandy McPeak as Chief Bradley

Jimmy Jackson and Larry Bradley were technical advisors/actors.

== Episodes ==
=== Pilot Movie ===
No. in season	Title	Directed by	Written by	Original release date
Pilot	"Nasty Boys"	Rick Rosenthal	Story by : Dick Wolf; Teleplay by : Dick Wolf and David Black	September 22, 1989

=== Series ===
No. in season	Title	Directed by	Written by	Original release date
1	"Fire and Ice"	Rob Cohen	Story by : Dick Wolf; Teleplay by : Robert Palm	February 23, 1990
2	"End Game"	Vern Gillum	Story by : Jack Richardson; Teleplay by : David Black & Michael Duggan	March 2, 1990
3	"The Good, the Bad and the Nasty"	James Quinn	Story by : Michael Duggan & Robert Palm & Daniel Sackheim; Teleplay by : Brad Markowitz & Robert Glass	March 9, 1990
4	"Last Tango in Vegas"	Janet Greek	Story by : Dick Wolf; Teleplay by : Robert Palm	March 16, 1990
5	"Flesh and Blood"	James Quinn	Story by : Michael Duggan & Edward Tivnan; Teleplay by : Brad Markowitz	March 30, 1990
6	"The Candidate"	Vern Gillum	Story by : Dick Wolf & Michael Duggan; Teleplay by : Brad Markowitz & Robert Palm	April 6, 1990
7	"The Line"	Michael Fresco	Story by : Robert Glass & Edward Tivnan; Teleplay by : Michael Pavone & Dave Alan Johnson	April 20, 1990
8	"Home Again"	Aaron Lipstadt	Russell Levine	April 27, 1990
9	"Crossover"	Jim Johnston	Story by : Bob Roe; Teleplay by : Bob Roe & Robert Palm	May 11, 1990
10	"Desert Run"	James Quinn	Harv Zimmel	May 18, 1990
11	"Blaze of Glory a/k/a/ Kill or Be Killed"	Aaron Lipstadt	Part 1:René Balcer & Brad Markowitz, Part 2: Jonathan Glassner	Unaired
12	"Blaze of Glory a/k/a/ Kill or Be Killed"	Leo Penn	Part 1:René Balcer & Brad Markowitz, Part 2: Jonathan Glassner	Unaired

== Production and broadcast history ==
Producer Dick Wolf, of Miami Vice fame and later of Law & Order fame, noticed the Nasty Boys and proposed to the two North Las Vegas Narcotics Officers, Jimmy Jackson and Larry Bradley, who had produced the anti-drug song that a television show to be released by Universal Studios, and broadcast on the NBC network. Jackson and Bradley agreed and provided stories to the writers, were technical advisors and acted in the pilot and several episodes. A pilot episode was aired as a TV movie September 21, 1989, and 13 episodes aired as a mid-season replacement show. The show was not renewed because that same year, NBC had begun producing many of their own television shows and only renewed one non-NBC production that year.

The Nasty Boys featured a diverse North Las Vegas Police narcotics unit consisting of six undercover police officers who fought crime in drug-ridden neighborhoods using “unorthodox” methods. The show starred Benjamin Bratt, Don Franklin, Craig Hurley, Jeff Kaake, James Pax, and Dennis Franz, who played Lieutenant Stan Krieger. William Russ played Lieutenant Farlow in the pilot movie and was killed off unexpectedly.

Basil Poledouris composed most of the episode scores.

The theme song was "Nasty" by Janet Jackson, though the song was performed by Lisa Keith and the lyrics were changed to fit the TV series.
