= Kinjite: Forbidden Subjects =

1989 film by J. Lee Thompson

- Theatrical release poster
- Directed by: J. Lee Thompson
- Written by: Harold Nebenzal
- Produced by: Pancho Kohner
- Starring: Charles Bronson; Perry Lopez; James Pax; Peggy Lipton; Sy Richardson; Juan Fernández
- Cinematography: Gideon Porath
- Edited by: Mary E. Jochem; Peter Lee-Thompson
- Music by: Greg De Belles
- Distributed by: Cannon Films
- Release date: February 3, 1989 (U.S.)
- Running time: 97 minutes
- Country: United States
- Language: English
- Box office: 3,416,846 (U.S.)

Kinjite: Forbidden Subjects is a 1989 American action thriller film directed by J. Lee Thompson and starring Charles Bronson, Perry Lopez, James Pax, Peggy Lipton, Sy Richardson and Juan Fernández. The Japanese word kinjite (禁じて) translates to English as "forbidden move", hinting at the subject matter.

As Thompson's final film, it was the last project he and Bronson did together. Beginning with the movie St. Ives in 1976, their partnership spanned nearly 13 years.

== Plot ==
Hiroshi Hada, a Japanese businessman in a troubled marriage, sees a woman being groped in a crowded Tokyo subway. He is fascinated by the fact that she moans silently, involuntarily orgasms, but does not cry out or let people know she is being sexually molested. When Hada is transferred to Los Angeles, he has too much to drink at a business party and tries to imitate what he saw by groping a Caucasian school girl while riding a crowded bus. But unlike the Japanese woman that Hada saw in Japan, the American girl screams. Hada runs away, but is robbed and beaten by a mugger. Meanwhile, several innocent Asian men are beaten by bystanders who suspect that one of them is the man who groped the girl.

The girl happens to be Rita Crowe, the daughter of an LAPD vice-squad detective, Lt. Crowe, an officer with a strong sense of justice who is very protective of her. Shortly afterward, Fumiko, Hada's daughter, is kidnapped into a child prostitution ring led by the infamous "Pimp King" Duke. Crowe, who has developed a general dislike of the Japanese due to his daughter's incident, is assigned against his will to find the girl. His feelings about Japanese people start to change when he realizes that the Hadas care about their daughter as intensely as he cares for his daughter.

Crowe and his partner, Eddie Rios, eventually find Fumiko and rescue her from the pimp and his gang. They kill one member of the gang, but the others escape. The Hadas visit Crowe's house with gifts to show their appreciation for his work. Rita recognizes Hiroshi as the man who groped her on the bus—and he recognizes her—but neither one says anything. However, despite this apparently happy ending, Fumiko has been so traumatized by her experiences as a prostitute—she was raped by Duke and his gang members and then sold to customers of both sexes—that she commits suicide by an overdose.

Crowe and Rios decide to find Duke, and locate him on a boat in a harbor. In the ensuing fight, Duke and his remaining gang members kill Rios, but Duke eventually ends up in the harbor. Since Duke can't swim, Crowe has the option to let the gangster drown, but ends up dragging him out. However, as a way of "poetic justice", Crowe has Duke interned in a prison wing inhabited by sexually aggressive inmates; his designated cellmate makes several sexual allusions, leading Duke to realize that he is intent on raping him. As Duke screams in anguish, Crowe walks away in deep satisfaction.

== Cast ==
Credits from the AFI Catalog of Feature Films:

- Charles Bronson as Lieutenant Crowe
- Perry Lopez as Detective Eddie Rios
- Juan Fernández as "Duke"
- James Pax as Hiroshi Hada
- Peggy Lipton as Kathleen Crowe
- Sy Richardson as Lavonne
- Marion Kodama Yue as Karuko Hada
- Bill McKinney as Father Burke
- Gerald Castillo as Captain Tovar
- Nicole Eggert as DeeDee
- Amy Hathaway as Rita Crowe
- Kumiko Hayakawa as Fumiko Hada
- Michelle Wong as Setsuko Hada
- Jim Ishida as Nakata
- Sam Chew Jr. as McLane
- Michael Chong as Lt. Lim
- Tom Morga as Krieger
- Jerome Thor as Perverted gentleman
- Robert Axelrod as Security guard
- Alex Hyde-White as English teacher
- Danny Trejo as Inmate
- Marilyn Dodds Frank as Pedophile
- Jophery Brown and Clifford Strong as Duke's thugs

== Production ==
Filming started in June 1988. It was one of a number of movies made in Hollywood with Japanese themes around this time, others including Collision Course and Black Rain. The movie was meant to be shot back to back with The Golem which was to have the same star (Bronson), producer (Kohner) and director (Thompson) as Kinjite but that film was not made.

Bronson said the film was "a little more interesting than most I've been offered" because of its culture clash element. "It's from the point of view of a policeman who never read a business page in his life," Bronson said, "but he can see what's happening and he's not sure he likes it or understands it.. I keep looking desperately for scripts that haven't been done dozens of times before. I think guys keep writing from what they see on TV, copying what's already there."

The film was the ninth Bronson had made with J. Lee Thompson. The star preferred Thompson to Michael Winner, calling the latter "brazen when he's working in a street. He takes it over and he doesn't care about complaints. But it's tough shooting with him. He demands three takes of every shot and, if it's hard running or some other action, it gets to you. J. Lee only demands two."

== Reception ==
=== Critical response ===
The Los Angeles Times called the movie "a pretty odd, murky stew. If you think you might be offended by it, don't go. You will be. Thompson has always had an evil sense of humor, and the movie repeatedly crosses the line between dramatizing a situation and exploiting it, exposing racism or moral rot and almost indulging in it. But the disturbance you feel in watching "Kinjite" doesn't just come because it has a sordid subject, some bad scenes or a heavy cargo of shock and sleaze, but because it leaves us, much of the time, with no moral anchor."

In a retrospective review, Evan Dossey writes "What truly sets Kinjite apart and makes it recommendable amid Bronson’s typically lazy late work is simply the shamelessness of the entire ordeal. Crowe’s punishments are sometimes downright bizarre; have you ever seen a man swallow an entire watch? His political and social views are heinous and essentially unquestioned. The ending is truly shocking. There are no good guys in this movie, not really, but that’s also not any particular point Bronson and regular collaborating director J. Lee Thompson were trying to make. There’s nothing on Kinjite’s mind beyond exploiting the fears of the day to the meanest ends possible."
