= Jeff Kaake =

American actor (born 1959)

- Born: January 10, 1959 (age 67); Detroit, Michigan, U.S.
- Occupations: Actor, producer
- Spouse: Barb Kaake

Jeff Kaake is an American actor best known for his portrayal of Paul Morrisey in Nasty Boys and Thomas Cole in Viper.

== Filmography ==
=== Film ===
Year	Title	Role	Notes
1987	Death Blow: A Cry for Justice	Phil	
1990	Bad Influence	Man in Bar	
1990	Border Shootout	Phil Sundeen	

=== Television ===
Year	Title	Role	Notes
1984	Three's a Crowd	Paul	Episode: "James Steps Out"
1984–1989	Dynasty	Dennis Grimes / Male Socialite	4 episodes
1986	Club Med	Bart	Television film
1986	Dallas	Actor	Episode: "Proof Positive"
1986–1987	1st & Ten	Jamie Waldren	10 episodes
1987	Hunter	David Lawrence	Episode: "Requiem for Sergeant McCall"
1987	Our House	Zak McCullough	Episode: "Sunday's Hero"
1988	Houston Knights		Episode: "Crime Spree"
1989	Nasty Boys	Paul Morrissey	Television film
1990	Nasty Boys	Paul Morrissey	13 episodes
1990	Nasty Boys, Part 2: Lone Justice	Paul Morrissey	Television film
1991	Seeds of Tragedy	Coggins	Television film
1991	Murder, She Wrote	Eddie Wheaton	Episode: "A Killing in Vegas"
1992	Lady Boss	Eddie Kane	Television film
1993	The Return of Ironside	Mike Quinn	Television film
1993	Silk Stalkings	Peter Dexter	Episode: "To Serve and Protect"
1993–1994	Space Rangers	Capt. John Boon	6 episodes
1994	Melrose Place	Chas Russell	4 episodes
1994	Diagnosis: Murder	Sports Reporter Stan Bidell	Episode: "The Busy Body"
1994	Robin's Hoods	Richard	Episode: "Hell Hath No Fury"
1995	Renegade	Chief Mike Turner	Episode: "Liar's Poker"
1995	Hudson Street	Leonard Collins	Episode: "A Man's Man"
1995	Hart to Hart: Two Harts in 3/4 Time	Ronnie Scott	Television film
1996	The Sentinel	Lee Brackett	Episode: "Rogue"
1996–1998	Viper	Thomas Cole / Terry Hawkes	44 episodes
1999	The Dream Team	Zack Hamilton	Episode: "Pilot"
2003	Hollywood Wives: The New Generation	Gregg Lynch	Television film
2004	The Young and the Restless	Gabe / Enforcer	3 episodes
2015	Stormageddon	Captain Meadows	Television film
2015	The Advocate	Dr. R. Head	Television film
