= The Space Between (2010 film) =

2010 film by Travis Fine

- Directed by: Travis Fine
- Written by: Travis Fine
- Produced by: Kristine Fine; Travis Fine; Lynette Howell
- Starring: Melissa Leo; AnnaSophia Robb; Anthony Keyvan; Phillip Rhys; Hunter Parrish; Kyle Bornheimer; Kelli Williams; Don Franklin; Brett Cullen; Sayed Badreya
- Cinematography: Marc Shap
- Edited by: Tom Cross
- Music by: Joey Newman
- Production company: TSB Films
- Release dates: April 23, 2010 (Tribeca Film Festival); September 11, 2011 (United States)
- Running time: 86 minutes
- Country: United States
- Language: English

The Space Between is a feature film written and directed by Travis Fine that premiered at the 2010 Tribeca Film Festival. The film is a fictional account of a flight attendant who finds herself responsible for an unaccompanied minor on the morning of the September 11 attacks. It has won three film awards. It had its U.S. television premiere on the USA Network on Sunday, 11 September 2011, the tenth anniversary of the attacks.

== Plot summary ==
Montine McLeod (Melissa Leo) is a flight attendant who gets stuck with nine-year-old Pakistani-American Omar Hassan (Anthony Keyvan) after their flight from New York City to Los Angeles gets grounded in Longview, Texas on the morning of 11 September 2001. Omar is an unaccompanied minor; in the chaos that ensues, Montine becomes his temporary guardian. Montine later discovers that Omar's father works in the World Trade Center. She decides to drive the boy home after he informs her his father is at home waiting for him in New York. On the journey, they begin to bond and learn more about each other. Montine makes a stop on the way to New York as she receives a call that her mother is dying. Upon arriving at her mother's house, she finds her mother already dead. After dealing with her mother's death, she continues on the road to take Omar home. When they get there, they learn Omar's father has not been home in the two days since the destruction of the Twin Towers. Later that night, Montine receives a call from her employer and is forced to bring Omar with her. At the ensuing meeting, Montine is terminated for the unauthorized trip; Omar is taken from her and given to his school head master for the night before leaving for a new school the following day (the reason he was on the original flight). The day Omar is set to leave for Los Angeles, he locks himself in the bathroom and refuses to come out. Montine is asked to come; she coaxes Omar out of the bathroom and she walks him to his flight to Los Angeles.

== Cast ==
- Melissa Leo as Montine McLeod
- Anthony Keyvan as Omar Hassan
- Brad William Henke as Will
- AnnaSophia Robb as Samantha "Sam" Jean McLeod
- Phillip Rhys as Maliq
- Hunter Parrish as McDonough
- Kyle Bornheimer
- Kelli Williams as Junkie
- Don Franklin as Paul Ehrlich
- Brett Cullen as Used Car Salesman
- Sayed Badreya as Imam
