= Danny Quinn =

Italian-American actor

- Born: Daniele Anthony Quinn; 16 April 1964 (age 62); Rome, Italy
- Occupation: Actor
- Years active: 1986–present
- Spouses: Lauren Holly (m. 1991; div. 1993) Nancy Maamary (m. 2016)
- Children: 1
- Father: Anthony Quinn

Danny Quinn (born Daniele Anthony Quinn; 16 April 1964) is an Italian-born American actor.

== Early life and career ==
He is the son of Mexican actor Anthony Quinn. Since 1986, he has appeared in more than twenty films, including his role as Carlos in the cult film Band of the Hand.

== Personal life ==
From 1991 to 1993, Quinn was married to the actress Lauren Holly.

On 21 October 2016, he married in Verona, Italy, Nancy Maamary, who is Lebanese, and they have a daughter, Luna Quinn, born on 14 March 2018. Danny Quinn's most famous movies are Mary Magdalene from 2000 and Judas and Thomas from 2001. In all of the three movies he plays Jesus of Nazareth.

He received the America Award of the Italy-USA Foundation in 2019.

== Selected filmography ==
Year	Title	Role	Notes
1986	Band of the Hand	Carlos	
1988	Stradivari	Francesco	
1989	The Betrothed	Renzo Tramaglino	
1993	Space Rangers	Daniel Kincaid	TV
1999	David and Lola	David	Director, Writer
2000	Mary Magdalene	Jesus	
2001	Thomas	Jesus	
2001	Judas	Jesus	
