= Space Rangers (TV series) =

- Space Rangers cast
- Genre: Science fiction Action-Adventure
- Created by: Pen Densham
- Starring: Jeff Kaake; Jack McGee; Marjorie Monaghan; Cary-Hiroyuki Tagawa; Danny Quinn; Clint Howard; Linda Hunt; Gottfried John
- Country of origin: United States
- No. of episodes: 6

Production
- Running time: approx. 46 minutes
- Production companies: RHI Entertainment; Trilogy Entertainment Group

Original release
- Network: CBS
- Release: January 6 – January 26, 1993

Space Rangers is an American futuristic science fiction drama. The series aired on CBS in 1993. The show was created by Pen Densham and Trilogy Entertainment Group.

== Synopsis ==
In the year 2104, the Earth colony Fort Hope on the distant planet Avalon struggles to survive. A small force of police/marines called the "Space Rangers Corps" are the only line of defense for the colonists against crime and the perils of interstellar exploration. The series concentrates on Captain John Boon and his team of Rangers aboard Ranger Slingship #377.

== Cast ==
- Jeff Kaake as Captain John Boon
- Jack McGee as Doc Kreugar
- Marjorie Monaghan as Jojo Thorson
- Cary-Hiroyuki Tagawa as Zylyn
- Danny Quinn as Daniel Kincaid
- Clint Howard as Dr Mimmer
- Linda Hunt as Commander Chennault
- Gottfried John as Colonel Erich Weiss

== Planets ==
- New Venus -A former Earth colony that was overrun with Banshees. While most of the men elected to abandon the colony, the women chose to stay and fight off the invaders. As a result the colony became an Amazon-like matriarchy. Jojo Thorsen originates from this colony and harbors a deep hatred for Banshees.
- Skaraab -A desolate planet where the days are so hot that the suns burn away all surface life in a matter of one day. The planet's vegetation has to grow back overnight and is so aggressive that it will even consume animal tissue in order to survive. It is also home to an ancient Graaka burial temple.
- Earth -Home to the Space Rangers Corps & its Central Command. It is several weeks away at lightspeed from Fort Hope.
- Avalon -Home to our heroes' colony of Fort Hope. On the outside it looks much like the Painted Desert in the American southwest.
- Catraz -Penal colony. A place where the galaxy's worst are dumped off never to be heard from again. There are no guards and no ways to leave. The planet is ruled by anarchy among the inmates. One inmate named Rec heads the majority of factions on the planet. The name is no doubt derived from the former San Francisco prison of Alcatraz Island which also had the reputation for being impossible to escape.
- Blood Nebula -A favorite hiding spot for smugglers and slavers. Its red clouds jam most sensors making enforcement in this area difficult at best.
- Vee'Lon Prime -A wet, sandy, and tropical planet home to the reptilian Vee'Lons.

== Production ==
Space Rangers was produced as a six episode miniseries by CBS. Pen Densham claimed he developed the series over several years under its working title of Planetbusters with Densham emphasizing the focus of the show wasn't on pure science-fiction like Star Trek and was instead more focused on action-adventure.

== Episodes ==
No.	Title	Directed by	Written by	Original release date
1	"The Replacements"	Ben Bolt	Gregory Widen	January 6, 1993
The Rangers are assigned a new android troubleshooter, who they dub "Ringer" (as in Dead), while they try to uncover the reasons behind a mining ship's hijacking. They're convinced that the ship is being used by a Hobbaba crime lord named Isogul for smuggling a deadly drug known as "Exjay", but if they cannot prove it, they have to return it. They also discover that Colonel Weiss plans to eventually replace all human Space Rangers with androids.
2	"Banshees"	David Burton Morris	Herbert J. Wright	January 13, 1993
Colonel Weiss asks the Rangers to trap one of the deadly space predators known as Banshees - a request that Boon refuses until he learns a young boy (Rick Latini III) is trapped on an abandoned slaver spaceship in the Blood Nebula with some of the creatures. Once aboard the spaceship, they have difficulty finding him and learn the secret of his exceptionally long survival. They also have to worry about saving their own lives against creatures they know little about.
3	"Death Before Dishonor"	David Burton Morris	Ed Spielman & Howard Spielman	January 20, 1993
Captain Boon twice accidentally offends a race of reptilian warriors known as Vee'Lons. The Vee'Lon's dignitary Prince Gor'Dah (Sherman Howard), sentences Boon and his crew to death and declares war on Fort Hope & Central Command. After Central Command's Ambassador Hardcastle is assassinated, Chennault and Weiss are left alone to prevent an attack on Fort Hope. The crew's only way to avoid execution is for to Boon challenge the Prince Gor'Dah in a duel to the death in hand-to-hand combat.
4	"Space Rangers aka Fort Hope"	Mikael Salomon	Story by : Pen Densham; Teleplay by : Pen Densham & Jay Roach	January 27, 1993
A lone escape pod reaches Fort Hope, its passenger tells the Rangers of a transport ship that went down. The ship was carrying Boon's former captain ex-Ranger Decker (Wings Hauser) and Graaka High-Priest Nazzer (Pat Morita) as it went down on the desolate planet Skaraab, a lifeless, sun-scorched wasteland, that's also home to a sacred Graaka burial site. Boon picks up new team member Daniel Kincaid who is fresh out of the academy. Zylyn tells Boon a legend of an ancient weapon hidden on the planet a thousand years ago, and protected from intruders by deadly vegetation. The Rangers attempt a rescue mission that could cost them all their lives.
5	"To Be...or Not to Be"	Thom Eberhardt	Jess Hugh Mann	UNAIRED
A has-been comedian Lenny Hacker (Buddy Hackett) crash lands on prison planet Katraz on which there are no guards and from which no one ever leaves. Desperate to escape from yet another dress rehearsal for visiting General Kincaid (Danny's father), the Rangers undertake to rescue the comedian. General Kincaid holds Commander Chennault responsible for his son's safety. The team lands on the inhospitable penal colony and come face to face with its violent inhabitants, and the prisoners' vicious leader Rec.
6	"The Trial"	David Burton Morris	Story by : Pen Densham; Teleplay by : Gavin Scott	UNAIRED
Zylyn is accused of the murder of another Graakan. When they fail to find legal counsel for his defense, the rest of the Rangers are forced to defend him in court themselves. Convinced there is a conspiracy to bring discredit to the Graaka race, they hunt for evidence as to the identity of the real murderer. Meanwhile, Isogul, the ruthless Hobbaba crime lord, has a new card up his sleeve to destroy the Space Rangers' defense system from inside. His master plan is to take over control of Fort Hope, but the Rangers also have a plan of their own designed to stop Isogul's crime wave permanently.

== Media ==
The complete series was released for a short time on VHS tape. It was later released to DVD for Region 2.

On October 15, 2013, Mill Creek Entertainment released the complete series on DVD in Region 1. Oddly, the Mill Creek release contains two DVDs but contains all six episodes highly compressed onto the first disk, while the second disk has the same six episodes combined into three mini-movies of two episodes each. Furthermore, the Mill Creek release listed the episodes in the order they were intended to be watched in unlike the order they aired on TV. The Mill Creek release specifies the order as:

1. "Pilot" aka "Fort Hope"
2. "The Replacements"
3. "Banshees"
4. "Death Before Dishonor"
5. "The Trial"
6. "To Be Or Not To Be"

== See also ==
Star Rangers, a comic series from 1987–88 with similar characters and concepts.
