= Hercules and Xena – The Animated Movie: The Battle for Mount Olympus =

Hercules and Xena –; The Animated Movie: The Battle for Mount Olympus
- Digital release poster
- Directed by: Lynne Naylor
- Written by: John Loy
- Produced by: Lynne Naylor; Sam Raimi; Robert Tapert
- Starring: Kevin Sorbo; Lucy Lawless; Michael Hurst; Renee O'Connor; Kevin Smith; Alexandra Tydings; David Mackie
- Cinematography: Yoon Gun; Wan-Ryeok Yim; Hak-Su Yoon
- Music by: Joseph LoDuca
- Production companies: Universal Cartoon Studios; Renaissance Pictures
- Distributed by: Universal Studios Home Video
- Release date: January 6, 1998
- Running time: 80 minutes
- Country: United States
- Language: English

Hercules and Xena – The Animated Movie: The Battle for Mount Olympus (Note: The film is also known as Hercules and Xena: The Battle for Mount Olympus.) is a 1998 American animated action-adventure direct-to-video film starring the voices of Kevin Sorbo, Lucy Lawless, Michael Hurst, Renee O'Connor, Kevin Smith and Alexandra Tydings, all reprising their roles from the two live-action/special effects television series, Hercules: The Legendary Journeys and Xena: Warrior Princess. In the film, Zeus' wife Hera releases the four Titans after eons of imprisonment in a fit of jealousy, prompting Hercules and Xena to join forces and stop her. The film was produced and directed by Lynne Naylor.

== Plot ==
Long after Zeus stole the Cronus Stone from the Titans, he and Alcmene gave birth to a son named Hercules, who defeated a Hydra at an early age and became a hero. After Hercules defeats a sea serpent and is thanked by the local townspeople, Iolaus joins him. Hercules and Iolaus head to Thebes to see Alcmene, fighting a group of highwaymen along the way. Meanwhile, Xena and Gabrielle steal a bag of gold back from a trio of satyrs to return to Corinth. Ares appears and tells Xena there is a trap set for Hercules at Thebes. Xena wants Hercules to go because Thebes needs his help. Xena, angered by Ares' intentions to take her as his wife, argues with Gabrielle.

Hercules and Iolaus are working the fields at Alcmene's farm when Zeus descends to abduct Alcmene to take her to Mount Olympus, despite Hercules' attempts to stop him. Angered, Hercules decides to rescue her, despite Iolaus' observation that Alcmene seemed willing to go. Ares reveals to Zeus that he wants Xena and had tried to get her help to stop Hercules before he witnessed Zeus take Alcmene. Hera confronts Zeus before stealing the Cronus Stone, the stone that keeps the Titans in Tartarus. Hera summons the Titans out while Zeus checks on Alcmene, who has been shrunk and placed in a dollhouse castle for safety from Hera. Meanwhile, Aphrodite surfs down a mountain to warn Hercules about Hera, but he refuses to listen. Hera uses the Chronus to start an earthquake, causing the ground to split. A boy nearly falls into the lava pits, but is saved by Hercules and Iolaus. Xena and Gabrielle, in a nearby town, defeats three thugs who try to take advantage of the chaos caused by the earthquakes to do some looting. Hercules meets the Earth Titan Porphyrion as he emerges from the ground. Porphyrion tells Hercules to let him pass as his fight is with the gods on Mount Olympus. Hercules lets him past as long as he promises to leave the mortal world alone and take his fight to the gods as Hercules is not defending them. The Water Titan Tethys arises from the water as the Fire Titan Mnemosyne emerges from the volcano and the Air Titan Crius materializes from a tornado right in front of Xena and Gabrielle. The Titans plan their revenge on the gods for their humiliating defeat and imprisonment.

Zeus calls Artemis, Aphrodite and Ares together to fight the Titans and they hope Hercules will help them. Xena and Gabrielle are helping wounded people following the earthquake and Artemis decides to get Xena's help and transforms Gabrielle into a giant eagle as leverage. Xena flies on Gabrielle to the gods' home while Hercules climbs up. When Xena accuses Ares for what happened to Gabrielle, Artemis tells Xena the truth about her actions and offers a deal: Xena helps the gods fight the Titans and she'll revert Gabrielle back to normal.

The Titans reach Olympus and attack. Hercules rescues Alcmene after she fell out of the dollhouse and was returned to normal size and then departs, still refusing to help the gods against the Titans. Hera transforms Ares, Aphrodite, Artemis and Zeus into a goat, a cow, a rabbit, and a mouse, respectively after they are forced to flee Olympus. Gabrielle rescues Xena and Iolaus from the Titans. The others are dismayed that Hercules did not help the gods, which leaves Alcmene deeply upset with Hercules over his cold actions. When Xena and Ioalus arrive, she confronts Artemis and learns that she cannot turn Gabrielle or herself back due to the loss of the Cronus Stone as it was the source of their divine powers. Hercules finds out that Alcmene was sick and Zeus offered her immortality with him on Mount Olympus. Hercules is still angry at Zeus for abducting Alcmene in the first place, but begins to soften as he realizes his error in letting revenge poison him and not asking why Zeus took Alcmene in the first place, along with refusing to help protect Olympus from the Titans.

Hera scolds the Titans for wrecking Mount Olympus while they gloat over the defeat of the gods. However, behind Hera's back, when Tethys voices her disgust about her, Porphyrion assures her that Hera won't be giving them orders much longer. On Earth, Xena and Hercules reconcile and agree to help the gods get their home and Cronus Stone back. Hearing Xena's war cry as she, Hercules, and Iolaus head to Olympus on Gabrielle, Hera uses the Cronus Stone to strengthen the Titans, but she fails to force her will on the Titans. The Titans strip the stone away from Hera and shrink her into the dollhouse. The heroes ride Gabrielle to the mountain and fight the Titans. Hercules gets the Cronus Stone and tears it apart, which causes the Underworld caverns to open. Xena knocks Crius into the lava and Iolaus gets Tethys and Mnemosyne to collide and dissolve into the fiery pits. Porphyrion grabs Hercules, but is pulled into the air by Gabrielle. Gabrielle drops the Titan into the cavern, but though Porphyrion tries to drag them with him, Hercules stops him, but nearly falls to his death. However, Gabrielle saves Hercules, and drops him off on the gods' mountain in time to close the stone, locking the Titans in their prison. With the Titans imprisoned in Tartarus again, Hera's magic on the other gods is broken, and Zeus, Aphrodite, Artemis, and Ares are returned to their human forms. Zeus has a chance to gloat at his queen as she voices her annoyance over her defeat while still doll-sized. Artemis returns Gabrielle to normal.

Zeus and Alcmene go back to Olympus and Zeus welcomes Hercules to visit. Hercules heads off with Iolaus, Gabrielle, and Xena to Corinth to return a bag of gold and seek another adventure.

== Voice cast ==
- Kevin Sorbo as Hercules
- Lucy Lawless as Xena
- Michael Hurst as Iolaus
- Renee O'Connor as Gabrielle
- Alexandra Tydings as Aphrodite
- Kevin Smith as Ares
- Josephine Davison as Alcmene and Artemis
- Joy Watson as Hera
- Peter Rowley as Zeus
- David Mackie as Porphyrion
- Alison Wall as Tethys and Mnemosyne
- Ted Raimi as Crius
- George Ball as Porphyrion (singing voice)
- Roger Freeland as Crius (singing voice)
- Amanda McBroom as Mnemosyne (singing voice)
- B.J. Ward as Tethys (singing voice)

== See also ==
- List of films featuring Hercules
- List of animated feature-length films
