= Alison Wall =

New Zealand actress

- Born: February 1, 1966 (age 59); Auckland, New Zealand
- Years active: 1981–2001
- Awards: 1998 for Best Performer in Comedy for the TV Guide

Alison Wall (born 1966 in Auckland) is an actress and a comedian, best known for her role as Minya in the American TV series Xena: Warrior Princess.

== Biography ==
=== Career ===
Wall is a comedy veteran, having worked on New Zealand comedy shows Issues, That Comedy Show and Comedy Central – having later played the comedic Minya on the TV series Xena: Warrior Princess and voiced both the Greek Titanesses Tethys and Mnemosyne on the animated movie Hercules and Xena – The Battle for Mount Olympus (1998).

Wall hasn't acted since 2001.

== Filmography ==
Film and television
Year	Title	Role	Notes
1981	Prisoners	Elizabeth's friend	
1987-1989	Funny Business	Various	TV series
1990	1990: The Issues	Various characters	TV series
1991	Issues	Various characters	TV series
1992	More Issues	Various characters	TV series
1997	Xena: Warrior Princess	Minya	Episode: "A Day in the Life"
1998	Xena: Warrior Princess	Minya	Episode: "The Quill is Mightier..."
1998	Point your Toes, Cushla!	Mother	Short film
1998	Hercules and Xena - The Animated Movie: The Battle for Mount Olympus	Tethys/Mnemosyne (voice)	Video
1999	Greenstone	Lady Evelyn	TV series
1999	Xena: Warrior Princess	Minya	Episode: "The Play's the Thing"; Episode: "Takes One to Know One"
1999	Young Hercules	Galinthia	Episode: "The Head That Wears the Crown"
2000	Channelling Baby	Childbirth nurse #2	
2000	Topp Twins III	Doris Gilhooley; Bowling lady	Episode: "FARM the Musical"; Episode: "Bowls and Golf"
2001	Xena: Warrior Princess	Clea	Episode: "Send in the Clones"

=== Awards ===
Wall won on 1998 in the category Best Performer in the Comedy, in a vote made for the TV Guide.
