= List of Hercules: The Legendary Journeys and Xena: Warrior Princess characters =

Hercules: The Legendary Journeys is an American television series based on the tales of the classical Greek hero, produced from January 16, 1995, to November 22, 1999. It had two spin-off series: Xena: Warrior Princess, which ran from 1995 to 2001, and the prequel Young Hercules, which ran in 1998 and 1999. This list includes significant characters from all three series.

== Main characters ==
Main characters: (left to right) Gabrielle, Xena, Hercules and Iolaus

- Hercules (portrayed by Kevin Sorbo as an adult, Ian Bohen as young Hercules in flashbacks, Ryan Gosling as young Hercules in Young Hercules) - The demi-god son of Zeus and Alcmene and strongest man in the world, and arch-rival to his older half brother Ares, the God of War. The champion of man who defeated and reformed the once power-hungry warlord Xena making her see the errors of her ways that set her on her path of redemption.
- Iolaus (portrayed by Michael Hurst as an adult, and Dean O'Gorman as young Iolaus in flashbacks and in Young Hercules) - Hercules' sidekick, best friend, and companion.
- Xena (portrayed by Lucy Lawless) - Once a power-hungry warlord, she was shown the error of her ways by Hercules and later repented and renounced her old life as an evil warrior. However, as she was about to turn her back on her old life, she came across a group of young girls destined to be sold into slavery, one of which was Gabrielle, who later allied and morally guided Xena in her adventurous journeys. Xena is considered to be a counterpart of Hercules, despite her supposed pure-mortal blood-status. She is considered extremely powerful in the spiritual world, having defeated Alti on many occasions.
- Gabrielle (portrayed by Renee O'Connor) - One of a number of farm girls who were about to become slaves. She was rescued in Xena's first acts of good and immediately decided to remain with Xena as an ally. Though Xena initially resisted her, Gabrielle pushed her luck and impressed Xena enough to become her sidekick. She is Xena's moral guide, companion, and love interest.

== The Amazons ==
The Amazons are an all-female tribe who make frequent appearances in the series. They are first depicted as a large nation that spreads throughout the land and then later as a number of tribes scattered throughout the world, segregated by an unknown cataclysm from their distant past. The Amazons trace their creation to the goddess Artemis, and value an all-female society that strives to uphold the same rights and freedoms for women as those of men. Each tribe is headed by a queen, whose position may be either inherited, or passed on as a right of caste to any named successor. A queen's authority may also be openly challenged by another royal Amazon and her title relinquished if she is defeated in single combat.

Although several tribes are known in different countries, Xena deals prominently with the Greek Amazons and the Northern Amazons of Siberia. With her fighting skills and advocacy for women's rights, Xena bears a striking resemblance to the Amazons. But she is careful to emphasize that she is not an Amazon, nor does she deserve the honor of becoming one. She turns down offers to join the tribes, preferring an independent, nomadic lifestyle to the membership of a collective. The series reveals that some of the Amazons do not trust Xena because of atrocities she committed against them in her past, although most respect her abilities as a warrior.

Gabrielle, on the other hand, during her first encounter with the Greek Amazon tribe throws herself over an Amazon named Terreis to protect her from falling arrows. Although Terreis is already dying, she is impressed by Gabrielle's bravery and gives her right of caste. Terreis was the next in line to rule, and by giving Gabrielle the right, Gabrielle becomes an Amazon Princess of the Greek tribe.

This chance encounter leads to Gabrielle's acceptance into the Amazons, and with it she carries her title's duties and expectations. Although Gabrielle decides to continue to follow Xena on her adventures, she is occasionally called by her Amazon sisters in times of need or to fulfill her duties as royalty. The tribes also value Xena as an experienced warrior, and occasionally request her assistance.

Among the known Amazons are:

- Amarice (portrayed by Jennifer Sky) - She is an over-zealous young Amazon. She disputed Eli's philosophy of non-violence and criticized Gabrielle for following it. Amarice vowed to live her life in memory of "The Warrior Princess". Killed in battle.
- Chilapa (portrayed by Nicole Whippy) - The second-in-command to the residing Amazon queen Ephiny. When Ephiny is killed in battle at the hands of Brutus, Chilapa leads the Amazons until the return of Gabrielle, who is the true queen of that tribe. When Gabrielle decides to step down from her role as queen and remain with Xena, Gabrielle gives her Right of Caste to Chilapa to serve as official queen of that tribe.
- Lilith (portrayed by Susan Brady as an adult, Jodie Rimmer as a teenager) - Jason's first love, and mother of his daughter Seska.
- Melosa (portrayed by Alison Bruce) - The queen of an Amazon tribe of Greece. Her sister Terreis is killed by an arrow and protected by Gabrielle who bestows upon her her right of caste. Melosa upholds the right of caste despite protests from Ephiny.
- Princess Terreis (portrayed by Rebekah Mercer) - Princess of the Telaquire Amazons. Killed by Krykus in battle. She was replaced by Gabrielle.
- Queen Cyane I (portrayed by Victoria Pratt) - Queen of the Northern tribes. Killed by Xena under Alti's influence.
- Queen Cyane II (portrayed by Shelley Edwards) - Another queen of the northern tribes.
- Queen Cyane III (portrayed by Morgan Reese Fairhead) - The third and final queen of the Northern tribes.
- Queen Ephiny (portrayed by Danielle Cormack) - The proud and loyal Amazon queen of the Telaquire tribe. Although loyal to her tribe, she wanted to foster peace between her people and the Centaurs. She later marries a Centaur named Phantes, and bears him a centaur son named Xenan in honor of Xena. She is the queen of an Amazon tribe while Queen Gabrielle is away. She is later killed by Brutus and her spirit is later seen by Gabrielle.
- Queen Gwyn-Teir (portrayed by Kirstie O'Sullivan) - Queen of the Celtic tribes. Killed in battle and her body fed to a shark to save the other Amazons from shark's teeth.
- Queen Hippolyta (portrayed by Roma Downey) - Daughter of Ares and an unknown mortal woman. She is the queen of the Amazons.
- Queen Kanae (portrayed by Marise Wipani) - Queen of the Telaquire tribes.
- Queen Marga (portrayed by Sela Apera) - A queen of the Greek tribes who was killed by Prince Moloch.
- Queen Mawu-Ka (portrayed by Michelle Blanchard) - Queen of the African tribes. Killed in battle.
- Queen Mayam (portrayed by Tina Cleary) - The queen of a renegade outlaw Amazon tribe. She was responsible for blinding Ruun, killing his parents, and abducting his sister Siri. She was later killed in battle by Hercules.
- Queen Otere (portrayed by Sanelle Vosloo as a child, Sheeri Rappaport as adult) - A child who as an adult became a queen of the Northern tribes.
- Queen Varia (portrayed by Tsianina Joelson) - Another queen of the Greek tribes who trained by Xena after Marga's death.
- Solari (portrayed by Jodie Dorday) - An Amazon who befriends Gabrielle and supports her becoming Queen of the Amazons. Velasca declares her a traitor to the Amazon nation. In "A Necessary Evil", Solari aids in attacking Velasca and setting up a trap to slow her down. She was killed at the beginning of the episode "Endgame" by Brutus' troops.
- Tura (portrayed by Mia Korning) - Varia's younger sister. Killed in Livia's attack.
- Yakut (portrayed by Kate Elliott) - The shamaness of the Northern tribes who revived Alti's spirit for good without the knowledge of the danger. Killed in battle, but her spirit continued forever.

== Mortals ==
- 50 Daughters of King Thespius - 50 unnamed women who are King Thespius' daughters. When King Thespius became the King of Athens, his oldest daughter (portrayed by Nancy Schroeder) and her sisters pursued Hercules so that he would sire children with them. When they followed him to Traycus, they eventually turned their attention to Salmoneus. In "The Wedding of Alcmene," the 50 Daughters of King Thespius attended the Wedding of Alcmene where most of them met Domesticles. The lead sister asked Alcmene why Hercules was shy around her.
- Alcmene (portrayed by Jennifer Ludlam, Kim Michalis, Elizabeth Hawthorne, Liddy Holloway, Rachel Blakely, and Sharon Tyrrell in the TV series, voiced by Josephine Davison in the animated film) - Alcmene is the mother of Hercules and Iphicles through Zeus. Later on her life, Alcmene marries King Jason which resulted in Jason passing the crown to Iphicles. She later dies of a weak heart.
- Alti (portrayed by Claire Stansfield) - Alti is an evil shaman who sought revenge against the Siberian Amazon nation for expelling her from their tribe. She is repeatedly defeated by Xena and Gabrielle.
- Amphion (portrayed by Brad Carpenter) - A warrior who fought many battles alongside Hercules and Iolaus. During the Siege of Carthage, the men under his command disobeyed his orders and killed the women and children. Because of this, Amphion left the warrior business, became a holy man of peace, and settled in Plurabus. The then fell in love with Lea. The politician Tracius framed Amphion for killing Tallus and Shira. When Hercules and Iolaus found the Sword of Veracity, they proved Amphion's innocent and exposed Tracius as the true culprit. Afterwards, Amphion and Lea got married. In "The Wedding of Alcmene", Amphion officiated the wedding of Jason and Alcmene.
- Argonauts - A group of heroes who accompanied Jason, Hercules, and Iolaus in finding the Golden Fleece.
  - Archivus (portrayed by Tim Raby) - The Argonauts' bard and recorder. In "The Wedding of Alcmene", Archivus attended the wedding of Jason and Alcmene where he assisted in fighting off the mercenaries enlisted by Patronius.
  - Domesticles (portrayed by John Sumner) - The Argonauts' master of the discus. In "The Wedding of Alcmene", Domesticles attended the wedding of Jason and Alcmene and even spent time with the 50 Daughters of King Thespius. He later assisted in fighting off the mercenaries enlisted by Patronius.
  - Phoebe (portrayed by Willa O'Neill) - The daughter of the Argonauts' lookout Lycinus who accompanied the Argonauts into reclaiming the Golden Fleece from the Blood-Eye Cult following her father's death. In "The Wedding of Alcmene", Phoebe attended the wedding of Jason and Alcmene. She told Hercules that Echidna can't come as she is pregnant. Phoebe later assisted in fighting off the mercenaries enlisted by Patronius.
- Atalanta (portrayed by Corey Everson) - Atalanta is a Greek athlete, blacksmith, and female warrior exclusive in Hercules: The Legendary Journeys. She fell in love with Hercules right from her first appearance.
- Autolycus (portrayed by Bruce Campbell) - Autolycus is the self-proclaimed "King of Thieves" who has a kinder heart than he lets on. He is friends with Xena and Hercules, though they don't always trust him for his devious nature. In Greek mythology outside of the show, Autolycus is a demigod son of Hermes and Chione.
- Bellerophon (portrayed by Craig Parker) - Believes himself to be a son of Artemis by a mortal father. He swore to exterminate the Amazons after they abandoned Artemis as their Goddess of worship. When Bellerophon recognizes Xena among the Amazons he is attacking, he makes a plan to trap and kill her in retribution for killing his mother Artemis. When Xena prevails in battle, she gives Bellerophon the opportunity to live by giving up his fight against the Amazons, but he believes he can't be killed since he is a half-god which sealed his fate.
- Beowulf (portrayed by Renato Bartolomei) - A warrior who recruits Xena to kill the monster Grindl.
- Borias (portrayed by Marton Csokas) - A warlord who became good. He later became Xena's lover, and the father of Solan. He unsuccessfully tried to make numerous alliances during his expedition with Xena. He grew concerned with Xena's involvement with Alti, especially upon learning she was pregnant. As their relationship crumbled, he grew distant as Xena showed her power-mad true self. His end came during the Battle of Corinth while Xena was searching for the Ixion stone and took centaurs prisoners. Knowing their relationship was over, Xena refused to wait to give birth to their son or give him to Borias. After failing to convince Xena to not start a war with the centaurs, he betrayed her and became allies with the centaurs. During a night attack he tried to get Xena to leave with him, but Xena's servant Satrina crippled his knee by stabbing him in his leg and Dagninr easily killed him. Borias caught a glimpse of his son before bleeding to death. Borias never forgave himself for abandoning his original family.
- Belach (portrayed by Marton Csokas) - The firstborn son of Borias and his then-wife Natassa and older half-brother of Solan, whom he never met. Xena seduced his father away from him as a young boy and he and his mother fell into servitude. Ever since then, Belach has despised his father and Xena even more. Currently a wealthy lord and the spitting image of his late father Borias, whose name was never to be spoken, he married the love of his life, Leanna, who died giving birth to his only daughter Nica. She fell in love with a centaur named Xenan, Ephiny's now-adult son, whom he believed kidnapped her. Driven by grief and anger, he declared war on all centaurs, had his men hunt them down and exterminate them, and placed a bounty on Xenan. After his army discovered the secret camp where the centaurs were hiding, his army massacred every centaur there, leaving no survivors. He army threw the centaurs bodies into a pit to be discovered by Xena, Gabrielle, Xenan and Nica. Xena revealed that Nica was pregnant with Xenan's child; unable to change his mind, she captured and kidnapped him and revealed who she was. Xena took him back to camp to show him what he did and make Belach understand that Borias was a good man. Later he captured Xenan and demanded a trade for his daughter Nica; instead Xena was willing to trade Belach's life for the centaur. A fight broke out and Xena and Belach were about to kill each other, but Xena revealed to Belach how her relationship with Borias crumbled and how he tried to change, dying for his son. Xena takes full responsibility and blame. Belach finally forgives his father and Xena, lets Xenan go and gives him and Nica a new home in which to live.
- Brunhilda (portrayed by Brittney Powell) - A warrior woman who falls in love with Gabrielle during the ring trilogy of Xena episodes.
- Cyrene (portrayed by Darien Takle) - Mother of Xena. Tavern and inn-keeper, prominent figure in the village of Amphipolis.
- Dagnine (portrayed by Mark Ferguson) - Xena former's right-hand and former lieutenant during the Battle of Corinth. Fought and killed Borias in a duel. Dagnine searched and found the Ixion Stone that transformed him into a hideous, but super-powered centaur. He was killed by Xena.
- David (portrayed by Antony Starr) - An Israelite shepherd, poet, and musician. With the help of Xena, he is able to determine the weak spot on Goliath's forehead and kill him with his sling, defeating the Philistines.
- Deianeira (portrayed by Tawny Kitaen) - Deianeira was the wife of Hercules. She gave birth to his three children; Aeson, Klonus, and Ilea. She was known to be feisty when she met Hercules. However, Deianeira and her children were killed by Hera.
- Draco (portrayed by Jay Laga'aia) - Warlord enemy of Xena.

- Eli (portrayed by Timothy Omundson) - Mystical healer befriended by Xena and Gabrielle in India, who later martyrs himself to Ares.
- Eve (portrayed by Adrienne Wilkinson) - Xena's daughter who bears Callisto's soul. When Xena and Gabrielle were believed to be dead, the infant Eve was taken in by Octavius, who is later known as Augustus Caesar, and raised to become Livia, the ruthless and bloodthirsty Champion of Rome. The return of her mother eventually causes Livia to discard her role as the Champion of Rome and embrace her original name, Eve, and become the messenger of Eli. Known as the bringer of Twilight, Eve's life has been targeted since birth as Xena has the power to kill the Gods so long as her daughter is alive.
- Falafel (portrayed by Paul Norell) - A traveling merchant who opened food stands all over Greece. He was selling fast food falafels when he first met Hercules in "The Other Side." In "Once a Hero", Falafel was in Argos selling souvenirs like Hercules dolls and Argo models at the time of a 10-year Argonaut reunion. In "Promises", Hercules and Iolaus found that Falafel had set up a fast food stand on the path to Zebron. Iolaus was so hungry that he went against Hercules' advice not to order from Falafel's fast food stand. The food gave Iolaus stomach problems. In "The Wedding of Alcmene", Falafel was on the road selling tacos to Princess Dirce at the time when Iolaus was running to get Iphicles. Though Iolaus encouraged her not to eat the tacos, Princess Dirce did so anyway and later threw up when she joined Iolaus. Hearing about Jason and Alcmene's wedding, Falafel invited himself to it as a caterer where he made them a giant wedding cake. In "Doomsday", Falafel owed money to his creditors and disguised himself with a beard where he sold sea serpents with "Eyes and Fries" in Euboa. In "Surprise", Falafel became a friend of Hercules' family and catered to his birthday party. When Callisto poisoned the guests, Falafel tried to kill Iphicles, whom he saw as a pig. In "The End of the Beginning", Falafel was in Cyrenia trying to sell a device called the Falafelometer. Hercules had to step in to save him when a rowdy villager tried to eat one of Falafel's egg-laying chickens.
- Felicita (portrayed by Kyrin Hall) - Wife of Gladius and former personal slave to Postera, wife of Menas Maxius, the governor of Apropus. She fell in love with the slave, Gladius, and together they conceived a child. Maxius kept the couple separated and when the child was born, he banished Felicita and her son from the province; telling Gladius that they had died during childbirth. Eventually, Felicita returned to Apropus to free Gladius. She was waylaid by a highwayman and rescued by Hercules and Iolaus. She told them her story and they agreed to find and free Gladius along with all the other slaves. In the end, the heroes were able to free the slaves; re-uniting Felicita and her son with Gladius.
- Gladius (portrayed by Tony Todd) - A brave warrior who was imprisoned and made a slave for fifteen years by Menas Maxius and his wife Postera in the Roman province of Apropus. He was made to fight in brutal gladiatorial games against vicious animals and against other slaves. Once, after pleasing his captors, he was offered the company of a woman named Felicita who was one of Postera's personal slaves. The two fell in love and conceived a child. Maxius lied to Gladius, telling him that Felicita died in childbirth when (in reality) she had merely been banished from Apropus. A broken-hearted man with nothing left to live for, Gladius continued to fight as a gladiator until Hercules (who infiltrated Apropus as a slave) brought him the news that his wife and child were still alive. Gladius assisted Hercules in freeing the other slaves and overthrowing the Romans before he was finally re-united with Felicita and his son.
- Gurkhan (portrayed by Calvin Tuteao) - A warlord with a reputation for being one of the most illustrious men in North Africa and he owns a collection of wives. He has many loyal bodyguards who act as his decoys to hide his true identity. Gurkhan is responsible for raiding and killing many villagers in Gabrielle's hometown Potidaea. He beheads Gabrielle's mother and father and kidnaps her niece, Sara. When Gabrielle returns to her home village, she finds out from her sister that Gurkhan was responsible for the raid. Gabrielle travels alongside Xena, Eve, and Virgil to North Africa, where they free Sara and Gurkhan's other wives and trick Gurkhan's guards into killing him.
- Heliotrope (portrayed by Julie Collis) - A prostitute and a friend of Mica who worked at the Pleasure Palace owned by Salmoneus' brother-in-law in Enola. The two of them took a liking to Salmoneus and saved him when Pilot tried to have him hanged for refusing to pay protection money. In "The Wedding of Alcmene", Heliotrope was a guest at Jason and Almene's wedding.
- Ilainus (portrayed by Musetta Vander) - Champion of Athena and second-in-command of her army. She appears in the Xena episode "Amphipolis Under Siege".
- Ixion of Telyte (portrayed by Christopher Saunoa) - a homeless orphan who was part of a group of homeless villagers led by Broteas and was often picked on by the man, always protected by the former prostitute Jana who became like a big sister or mother figure to him. When Hercules came to aid him and the other villagers, he found himself looking up to the man and idolizing him; aiding him in standing up to Broteas which ultimately led to the former leader getting ousted and banished from the group before they reached their destinate at Calydon.
- Jana (portrayed by Portia Dawson) - a former prostitute who was part of a group of homeless villagers led by Broteas who loved soliciting her. She took care of the young orphan Ixion of Telyte, becoming a big sister or mother figure to him; connecting over how both were orphans. When Hercules comes to lead them to the city of Calydon for safety from Hera's wrath, due to Broteas having stolen a chalice of hers, she comes to gain feelings for him. After aiding Hercules in exposing Broteas' lies and ending with his banishment, she and the others are led by Hercules to Calydon where they can live new lives. Although saddened when he has to leave to continue aiding the people of Greece, she expresses hope of seeing him again and gives him an affectionate kiss which he accepts.
- Jonathan (portrayed by Dale Corlett) - Son of Saul and crown prince of the Israelites, Jonathan leads their resistance against the occupying Philistines. He is killed by Goliath, who crushes him under a thrown chariot.
- Joxer (portrayed by Ted Raimi) - Joxer is a loyal friend to both Xena and Gabrielle. He is in love with Gabrielle, but his love is unrequited, so Joxer settles for being a good friend. Joxer comes from a ruthless warlord family, but he is the Black Sheep. He eventually marries Xena look-alike Meg and is the father to Virgil. Joxer is killed by Livia while he tries to protect Gabrielle. He is eventually reincarnated in modern America as a woman named Annie Day. When she believed herself to be the recent Xena vigilante depicted in the news, her boyfriend, Harry O'Casey, accompanied her to a past-life counsellor. It was then discovered that she was in fact the reincarnation of Joxer and Harry was that of Xena. Later, Ares swapped the souls of she and Harry.
- Julius Caesar (portrayed by Karl Urban) - Roman general and statesman and the Conqueror of Gaul. Once a lover and now enemy of Xena. Just like his historical counterpart, Julius Caesar was assassinated by a group of senatorial conspirators led by Brutus and Cassius on the Ides of March, 44 BC.
- King Iphicles (portrayed by Kevin Smith) - Half-brother of Hercules. His father is Amphitryon and his mother is Alcmene. Iphicles became a successor to Jason after the latter married Alcmene.
- King Jason (portrayed by Jeffrey Thomas at middle-age, Chris Conrad at young-adult) - The legendary ruler of Corinth and Argos, hero to Hercules, and leader of the Argonauts. Jason later gave up his crown to Iphicles and married Alcmene.
- King Sisyphus (voiced by Ray Henwood in "Death in Chains" and "Highway to Hades," Charles Siebert in "Ten Little Warlords") - The King of Corinth who cheated death and ran afoul of Xena and later Hercules. King Sisyphus was marked for death following a disagreement with Zeus. The first time, he cheated death by chaining up Celeste. Xena freed Celeste from her chains, but Sisyphus got away. The second time, King Sisyphus tricked a man named Timuron into taking his place. Hades enlists Hercules to apprehend King Sisyphus in three days, with failure meaning that Timuron will be condemned to Tartarus. Since his wife Karis was barren, King Sisyphus was told by the Oracle of Delphi to mate with Timuron's widow Daphne in to produce an heir. With help from Karis, Daphne, and Iolaus, Hercules apprehended King Sisyphus and handed him over to Hades. Hades instructs Charon to take King Sisyphus to Tartarus. King Sisyphus escaped from the Underworld and stole the Sword of Ares. He held a contest in which whoever slayed the Barrachus would win the Sword of Ares. While still trapped in Callisto's body, Xena worked with Ares to win the contest even when the truth of the Barrachus was revealed. When Xena and Ares win the contest, King Sisyphus admitted that Hades cut a deal with him to become the new God of War if he delivers the world's ten best warriors to him. After Xena gives Ares his sword back, King Sisyphus disappears back to Tartarus.
- Kirin (portrayed by Sam Jenkins) - princess of Castus, was once married to Prince Mileus who died in a war, leaving her to raise her two sons Protos and Macareus with the aid of her mother-in-law, Queen Parnassa. The queen takes advantage of an amnesiac Hercules (after Hera wiped his memory) and tried to brainwash him into believing he was her deceased son Mileus, with Princess Kirin to pose as his wife. The queen did not count on the princess gaining legitimate feelings for Hercules. Unable to bear the deception and wanting Hercules to love her as himself, the princess helps him get his memory back. Together, they overthrow the queen, with Kirin taking her place as ruler.
- Lao Ma (portrayed by Jacqueline Kim) - Lao Ma is a woman of peace and wisdom and wife of Laozi. She is one of the influential figures in Xena's life. Lao Ma possesses great spiritual power, which she tried to teach to Xena. Lao Ma in the Herc-Xenaverse is the true founder of Daoism.
- Lea (portrayed by Kim Michalis) - A young woman from Thrace whose parents were killed by the crooked politician Tracius. Upon arriving in Plurabus, she fell in love with Amphion even when Tracius framed him for the deaths of Tallus and Shira. Posing as a Hestian Virgin, she assisted Hercules and Iolaus into searching for the Sword of Veracity. Once the Sword of Veracity was in their possession, Lea, Hercules, and Iolaus exposed Amphion's innocence and exposed Tracius as the true culprit. Afterwards, Amphion and Lea got married. In "The Wedding of Alcmene," Lea was with Amphion when they were invited to the wedding of Jason and Alcmene. While Amphion officiated the wedding, Lea assisted in Iphicles' coronation.
- Lila (portrayed by Willa O'Neill) - Gabrielle's sister. She is a warm and adoring sister to Gabrielle, but conventional by comparison. She lives at home in Potidaea with their parents Herodotus and Hecuba. At first she resents Gabrielle leaving her, but when Gabrielle returns and helps to save their village, Lila soon develops a high regard for the maturity and the skills that Gabrielle has acquired over the course of her adventures with Xena. She catches up with Gabrielle whenever she can and at one point she travels from Potidaea to Amphipolis to attend a surprise birthday party for her. Many years later after Lila married and had a daughter named Sara, things went dark when her daughter was kidnapped by slave traders and sold to Gurkhan, a notorious warlord. With her sister and Xena temporarily missing, her parents and husband decided to take action into their own hands. The trio traveled hoping to get her back, but Gurkhan was quick to have her family beheaded. When Gabrielle and Xena were found alive, the two promised Lila to retrieve Sara.
- Lilith (portrayed by Jodie Rimmer and Susan Brady) - A friend of Hercules, Iolaus, Jason and cadet at the academy. Unbeknownst to their friends, Jason and Lilith began secretly dating, or "going steady" as Jason referred to it, before Lilith left the academy once more for an Amazon lifestyle. She soon discovered that she was pregnant with Jason's daughter, Seska, but decided to raise the child as an Amazon, with no need for a father. Lilith briefly reunited with Jason many years later when he became the new Headmaster at the academy. She introduced him to their daughter during this time. Lilith and Seska would later settle down in a village some distance away, where Seska briefly and illegally joined a coven of witches.
- Lyceus (portrayed by Aaron Devitt) - The younger brother of Xena and Toris. He was killed by Cortese.
- Mabon (portrayed by Nicko Vella) - A 10-year-old boy who is a Druid and the Keeper of Wisdom. Mabon is modeled after the Celtic god Mabon.
- Marcus (portrayed by Bobby Hosea) - an arms dealer who was later redeemed and a very close acquaintance and lover of Xena's, and probably a family friend since he knew Xena's mother. At some point in their relationship he claimed she tricked him. He was also Xena's true love mentioned in the scrolls, and Xena admitted her feelings when she and Marcus briefly rekindled their love. He was killed protecting a kidnapped princess and sent to Tartarus, but as a ghost was able to reach for Xena's help to save the Underworld, which was in chaos. He was given temporary life to help Xena stop a killer who stole Hades' Helmet of Invisibility, and the Underworld was taken over and set right. In order to rejudged by Hades, Xena had to kill Marcus, now a permanent resident in the Elysian Fields, and they shared a final kiss before she left the Underworld to return to the world of the living, knowing they would be reunited. Xena mentioned him as one of the victims whose life was stolen by Celestia along with her son and younger brother.
- M'Lila (portrayed by Ebonie Smith) - A runaway Gaelic slave girl from Egypt who teaches Xena how to use pressure points, and many other moves, in the season 2 episode "Destiny". M'Lila frees Xena from crucifixion in this episode, and is killed by Caesar's men while protecting her, which is what turns Xena evil. M'Lila's shirt design is what Xena later bases her armor on.
- Meg (portrayed by Lucy Lawless) - One of the many Xena look-alikes in the series. She first appears in the episode "Warrior... Princess... Tramp" where she is hired to impersonate Princess Diana, another Xena lookalike who had previously asked Xena to impersonate her as protection from assassins. She appears again during an incident involving a fourth Xena look-alike, Leah, a priestess dedicated to Hestia. Meg runs a brothel and has a bad reputation as a harlot and a petty thief. Ultimately she has a good heart, working alongside Xena and Gabrielle on numerous occasions. Later in life she marries Joxer and raises three children with him (presumably adopted, as Meg mentioned in one episode she was infertile).
- Mica (portrayed by Katherine Ransom) - A prostitute and a friend of Heliotrope who worked at the Pleasure Palace owned by Salmoneus' brother-in-law in Enola. The two of them took a liking to Salmoneus and even saved him when Pilot tried to have him hanged for refusing to pay protection money. In "The Wedding of Alcmene", Mica was a guest at Jason and Almene's wedding.
- Minya (portrayed by Alison Wall) - A common woman who yearns to be a fierce warrior like Xena. However, her attempts at heroics often end in comic relief. She is from the village of Laurel and is initially involved with fellow villager Hower, although later in the series she begins traveling and realizes she is a "thespian" after becoming involved with an actress named Paulina.
- Najara (portrayed by Kathryn Morris) - A strange warrior woman who is led through life by Djinn. She leads a group of warriors to fight for the light against evil. Xena discovers that Najara is not as good as she appears to be. Najara gives wrongdoers the chance to repent and turn to the light, but if they refuse or she senses their conversion is not pure, she then kills them. Xena eventually incarcerates her.
- Natassa (portrayed by Kim Michalis) - She was Borias's wife and the mother to his first son Belach. They split up when she discovered his affair with Xena and spit in Borias's face after he told her he wouldn't have cheated if she was more a woman. She and Belach fell into servitude after Borias abandoned them, and it is unclear if she ever forgave him.
- Nebula (portrayed by Gina Torres) - A female pirate who is the half-sister of Gilgamesh and princess of Sumeria.
- Perdicas (portrayed first by Anton Bentley and later by Scott Garrison) - Gabrielle's fiancé, but she is reluctant to marry him and runs away to travel with Xena instead. After Gabrielle left, Perdicas becomes a soldier to "toughen up." He meets with Gabrielle while fighting at Troy. He later appears again and tells Gabrielle that he is disillusioned with military service and is tired of killing. He asks Gabrielle to marry him, and she accepts. But soon after their wedding, he is killed by Xena's nemesis Callisto.
- Princess Dirce (portrayed by Lisa Chappell) - The daughter of King Meneleus of Cryos. She first appeared where she acted as the defense attorney for Iolaus when he was framed by Autolycus. After Autolycus was exposed as the culprit, Princess Dirce agreed to have her father rewrite the laws of Cryos. In "The Wedding of Alcmene", Princess Dirce encountered Iolaus while dining at Falafel's stand when he was going to get Iphicles to succeed Jason. In "Hercules on Trial", Princess Dirce was called to Athens by Iolaus when Hercules was being prosecuted by Spencius, who claimed that Hercules' heroism is costing the lives of those who try to be like him.
- Rena of Corinth (portrayed by Simone Kessell) - The stepdaughter of the warlord Gorgas who fell in love with Iphicles when he was posing as Hercules. She forgave Iphicles and went on to marry him. In "The Wedding of Alcmene", Rena was present at Jason and Alcmene's wedding and also when Jason crowned Iphicles the new King of Corinth. In "Love Takes a Holiday", Iolaus mentioned that King Iphicles and Rena are having a child. In "War Wounds", Rena was mentioned to have died of a disease when King Iphicles was away negotiating a dispute. King Iphicles never forgave himself for not being by Rena's side during her last day.
- Rheanna (portrayed by Audie England) - a rebel who led a fight against the corrupt king Melkos, and continued to lead it even after her lover Jordis was presumed dead. Hercules came to aid her and her people in the rebellion, the two growing feelings for one another. It is discovered Jordis is alive, and together they manage to defeat Melkos. She and Hercules part on good terms, the hero feeling the land was in good hands under her leadership.
- Salmoneus (portrayed by Robert Trebor) - A salesman who is always on the lookout to make a quick dinar and not above tricking people by selling faulty goods. Also a friend to Xena and Hercules. Occasionally, Salmoneus shows some caring and kindness.
- Solan (portrayed by David Taylor and Nicko Vella) - Xena and Borias' son who was raised by the centaur Kaleipus following Borias' death. Although he never knew his father Borias because he died on the day he was born, he heard about his good deed to the centaurs and also knows that his father did many terrible things before he became good. He was murdered by Gabrielle's evil demi-god daughter Hope, but his spirit later creates the Land of Illusia to help Xena and Gabrielle make amends for their friendship and past. His soul was trapped in the underworld after he refused to be sent to The Elysian Fields because he didn't want to forget his time with Xena. Xena eventually gets his soul to the Elysian Fields and he names Xena's daughter Eve. He is also the younger half-brother of Lord Belach, whom he never met.
- Tara (portrayed by Shiri Appleby) - A young girl who meets Xena and Gabrielle as they are asked to return the urn of Apollo. She initially tries to fight Gabrielle in order to take her place. Later she becomes a shop assistant in a town that prohibits dance.
- Tiresias (portrayed by Norman Forsey) - a blind prophet or seer who delighted in prognostications of "gloom and doom". He encountered Hercules in Parthus and accompanied him as he led a group of homeless villagers to the charmed city of Calydon. Tiresias later met Hercules in Meliad. He predicted horrible events would occur at a festival honoring Dionysus but in the end, he helped Hercules to stop Ares from infecting the populace of the city with his evil. He is joined by the dog Leucosia, a former human (played by Emma Turner) maiden from Parthus whom Zeus once fancied only to be cursed into a dog form by a jealous Queen Hera.
- Virgil (portrayed by William Gregory Lee) - The eldest son of Joxer and Meg. Virgil lives with his parents and younger brother and sister at the family's inn. Virgil is an aspiring poet and warrior. After his Joxer is reunited with Xena and Gabrielle, Virgil joins them on their quest to find Xena's long-lost daughter Eve. Virgil witnesses Joxer's death at the hands of Eve, then known as Livia, Champion of Rome.

== Gods ==
=== Olympians ===
Olympian Gods Ares and Aphrodite as seen in the Xena episode "The Quill Is Mightier..."

- Aphrodite (portrayed by Alexandra Tydings) - Aphrodite is the Greek Goddess of Love and child of Zeus and Dione. She is the half-sister of Hercules and other gods. Doesn't care about exposing her lingerie. Her son is Cupid (AKA Eros), the God of Love. She is depicted as a Valley girl. She is married to Hephaestus.
- Apollo (portrayed by Scott Michaelson) - Apollo is the Greek God of the Sun and Arts and son of Zeus and Leto. Unlike actual Greek mythology, Apollo is one of the rudest and most arrogant gods on Olympus.
- Ares (portrayed by Kevin Smith) - Ares is the Greek God of War. He is the half-brother of Hercules and other gods. He is known to be served by Discord, Strife, and Deimos. Ares is considered to be easily swayed, joining forces with Dahak at one point. Most of the gods dislike him, and he is taunted relentlessly by Athena. His unrequited love for Xena is a recurring theme between the two characters. In episodes like "Yes Virginia, There is a Hercules" and "For Those of You Just Joining Us", Ares was shown to interact with Kevin Sorbo, and stated that the actor was a form of Hercules.
- Artemis (portrayed by Josephine Davison in Xena, portrayed, voiced by Rhonda McHardy in Hercules and the animated movie, and portrayed by Anna Bernard in Young Hercules) - The twin sister of Apollo and child of Zeus and Leto, Artemis is the Greek Goddess of the Hunt and Moon, and is also the patron deity of the Amazons. Artemis once joined forces with Xena, Gabrielle, Iolaus, and others to battle the Titans that Hera had unleashed. Upon enlisting Hermes as her messenger, Artemis enlisted the aid of Hercules to reclaim her sacred bow after Autolycus stole it from her temple and sold it to Discord.
- Athena (portrayed by Amanda Lister, Jane Fullerton-Smith, and Paris Jefferson) - Athena is the Greek Goddess of Wisdom, Warfare, and Weaving. She is the daughter of Zeus and Metis. Athena is more understanding and caring than most other Olympian gods and in return she is beloved by mortals and is the one that even gained Xena's regard and respect.
- Bacchus (portrayed by Anthony Ray Parker and Kevin Smith) - The God of Wine. In this show, Bacchus is depicted as having an appearance of a ram-horned demon and is an outcast of the Olympians. He is often accompanied by his vampiric followers, the Bacchae.
- Celesta (portrayed by Kate Hodge) - The Goddess of Death and sister of Hades. King Sisyphus once chained her so that no one could die.
- Cupid (portrayed by Karl Urban) - The God of Love and the son of Aphrodite. As part of a plot to kill his uncle Hercules, his grandmother Hera curses him into becoming a green-eyed monster if he fell in love with a mortal who did not return his love. The curse appears when he falls in love with the beautiful mortal girl Psyche, who had feelings for Hercules. Hercules' whose feelings toward Psyche are platonic until he is enchanted into falling in love with her. Though the spell on Hercules is removed and Psyche realizes her feelings for Cupid, Aphrodite decides to make Psyche immortal to break the curse on Cupid after realizing the sincerity of Cupid and Psyche's feelings for one another.
- Deimos (portrayed by Joel Tobeck) - Deimos is the Greek God of Terror. He is Strife's cousin and is the twin brother of Phobos. Deimos is known for his annoying laughter and idiotic ideas.
- Demeter (portrayed by Sarah Wilson) - Sister of Zeus and Goddess of Agriculture. She bore Zeus a daughter named Persephone.
- Discord (portrayed by Meighan Desmond) - Discord is the Greek goddess of Discord and Retribution. She always tried to earn Ares' favor, constantly fighting with Strife and later Deimos for the position of Ares' second-in-command. Discord also had a bitter rivalry with Aphrodite.
- Fatuus (portrayed by Philip Grieve) - The God of Prophecy. He can only predict the future if the prophecy is bad.
- Fortune (portrayed by Lori Dungey) - The goddess of Luck. When Iolaus blamed himself for being unable to save a woman's life, Fortune granted him the request of memory loss so that he wouldn't be plagued by the event. Later at Hercules' request, she restored Iolaus' memories.
- Hades (portrayed by Mark Ferguson, Erik Thomson, and Stephen Lovatt) - Hades is the God of the Underworld. Though he is Zeus' older brother, he appears to be much younger. As in Greek mythology, Hades was responsible for abducting Persephone and making her his wife.
- Hephaestus (portrayed by Julian Garner and Jason Hoyte) - The God of Fire and the Gods' blacksmith. He is considered to be an ugly god and was disowned by Zeus and Hera because of it. Despite his appearance, Hephaestus was married to Aphrodite. Hephaestus created many weapons or equipment throughout the show such as: the Sword of Hephaestus (as seen in "Prometheus"); the Chains of Hephaestus (as seen in "Prometheus"; "Looking Death in the Eye," and "Motherhood"); the Metal of Hephaestus (as seen in "The Dirty Half Dozen" and "The Deliverer"); the Eye of Hephaestus (as seen in "The Xena Scrolls"); the Shield of Perseus (as seen in "Love Takes a Holiday"); the Metal Panther (as seen in "Love Takes a Holiday"); the Armor of Hephaestus (as seen in "Love Takes a Holiday"); Galatea (as seen in "Cyrano de Hercules"), and Hercules' gauntlets.
- Hera (portrayed by Meg Foster in the TV series, voiced by Joy Watson in the animated movie) - Hera is the Queen of the Olympian gods and the wife of Zeus. Hera is Hercules' jealous stepmother. Hera has many followers where some of them pray to her for help in defeating Hercules. During her fight with Hercules, Hera was tossed into Tartarus by Hercules. Zeus later used Evander to free Hera, who had no memory of her past actions until Ares obtained help from the Fates to restore her memories. After helping to keep Evander alive, Hera drops her vendetta against Hercules.
- Hermes (portrayed by Murray King) - The son of Zeus and the Pleiad Maia. He serves as the Messenger of the Gods. In "Porkules," Hermes delivered a message to Hercules stating that Artemis' bow had been stolen. Iolaus and Autolycus once borrowed his winged sandals.
- Lachrymose (portrayed by John Gadsby) - The God of Despair who isn't very good at promoting it.
- Momus (portrayed by Ranald Hendriks) - The God of Satire, Mockery, and Censure. He is also associated with writers and poets. Momus was a close friend of Apollo's and could often be found in one of Apollo's temples. He was often exiled from Mount Olympus for mocking the other gods.
- Morpheus (portrayed by Stephen Lovatt) - The God of Dreams. Strife once told Morpheus to give Hercules a nightmare where he kills Serena in her sleep.
- Nemesis (portrayed by Karen Witter, Teresa Hill, Kimberly Joseph, and Charmaine Guest) - Nemesis is the Greek Goddess of Divine Justice and Retribution. She was Hercules' childhood friend and sweetheart. Hera once sent her to kill Hercules. When she failed to do that, Hera rendered Nemesis mortal and created the Enforcer to take her place. She later gave birth to Evander.
- Persephone (portrayed by Andrea Croton) - Daughter of Zeus and Demeter. She is married to her uncle Hades as in the myths after he abducted her.
- Poseidon (voiced by Charles Siebert in the first appearance, Rick Jacobson in the fourth appearance) - Poseidon is the God of the Sea and the brother of Zeus. He is made completely of water, stands 30 feet tall, carries a yellow trident, and wears a crown.
- Strife (portrayed by Joel Tobeck) - Strife is the Greek God of Strife. He is the cousin of Deimos. Strife constantly tagged along with Ares in his numerous plans to fight Hercules and Xena, but he usually bumbled the operations. Butting heads on occasion with Discord, who also wanted attention from Ares, Strife usually tried Ares' patience. Strife was seemingly killed by Callisto when she stabbed him with a dagger that was stained with the Golden Hind's blood (the only thing that could kill a god). He is seen alive in the future aiding his uncle Ares.
- Triton (portrayed by Bruce Hopkins) - A sea god who is the brother of Poseidon and the father of the mermaid Nautica.
- Zeus (portrayed by Anthony Quinn in the TV movies, Peter Vere-Jones in "Judgement Day," Roy Dotrice in Season 4, John Bach in "Valley of the Shadow," Charles Keating in "Full Circle" and "God Fearing Child", voiced by Peter Rowley in the animated movie) - Zeus is the King of the Olympian Gods. After impregnating Alcmene, he had never been there for Hercules. However, he intended on making up for it. Zeus was portrayed as a caring father who frequently drops in on Hercules. However, he refused to help Hercules with the loss of Deianeira, Serena, or his children since he says that a god cannot bring anyone who has been killed by another god back to life. Hercules and Zeus reconcile in the end and form the longed for father-and-son bond.

=== Norse ===
- Baldur (portrayed by Rupert Cox) - Baldur is the Norse God of Light. He is the youngest and third son of Odin and Frigga. His brothers are Loki and Thor. Baldur is one of the few gods in the world who care about mortals. Baldur and Hercules each had exactly the same dream at the same time, in which Baldur asks Hercules to help him just before he dies. Hercules travels to the Norseland after the dream, and meets Baldur. After Baldur is killed, Hercules must learn who did it and why. Hercules ends up changing the past with the paint of Fate, he saves Baldur's life, and stops Ragnarök, the Twilight of the Gods.
- Frigga (portrayed by Donogh Rees) - The Norse Goddess of Marriage and the Sky, the wife of Odin.
- Loki (portrayed by Ian Hughes) - Loki is the Norse God of mischief. He and Dahak team up in an attempt to start Ragnarök.
- Norns - The Norse counterparts of the Fates.
- Odin (portrayed by Peter McCauley in Hercules: The Legendary Journeys, Alexander Peterson in Xena: Warrior Princess) - Odin is the father of the Norse Gods, and Ruler of Asgard and Valhalla.
- Thor (portrayed by Ben Reed) - Thor is the Norse Thunder God and son of Odin and Jord. He is pictured to be big, powerful and short-tempered, preferring to solve things with force.

=== Hindu ===
- Hanuman - The Hindu monkey god.
- Indrajit - The king of demons.
- Krishna
- Rama
- Shakti - Takes the form of a female army leader.
- Tataka - The possessed Gabrielle when she is worshiped as a goddess and a Devi.

=== Other Gods ===
- Callisto (portrayed by Hudson Leick and Lucy Lawless) - Callisto is born as a mortal and loses her family at an early age when Xena's army razes Callisto's village Cirrha. Her hatred towards Xena fuels her motivation to kill in Xena's name. She hates Xena, but despises Hercules and often works as Hera's assassin to destroy both of them. Callisto is given immortality by Hera, but Hercules traps her in a cavern, which Xena reluctantly frees her from. Xena offers her a chance at godhood, in exchange for getting rid of the newly immortal Velasca, only to trap both of them in lava. Callisto meets Gabrielle's daughter, Hope, and conspires to kill Solan and Xena. She is pushed aside by Hope and Xena agrees to grant Callisto her well-deserved oblivion in exchange for killing Hope. When Gabrielle pushes Hope and herself into Dahak's fiery pit, Callisto quickly changes her mind, only for Xena to stab her with the hind's-blood dagger. Callisto is later redeemed by Xena and is reincarnated as Eve, Xena's daughter.
- Cabiri (voiced by Donogh Rees) - An elemental force which predates the Gods. She is said to be an ally of Hephaestus. Hercules knocked down some pillars in her ruins to get her to listen to his plea to make another trident to save Triton's life.
- Dahak (portrayed by Michael Hurst and Mark Newnham) - Dahak is a powerful godly entity that is bent on evil, chaos, and destruction. He impregnated Gabrielle, the Battling Bard of Potidaea, with his evil daughter. When Gilgamesh killed Iolaus, the evil god took control over Iolaus' body. Dahak had made his way into killing the Sumerian Gods and the Druids. He almost eliminated the Norse Gods and the Greek Gods, but was stopped by the combined effort of Hercules and Iolaus in a spiritual battle.
- Dumuzi - A Sumerian god who acts as the Gatekeeper of the Underworld.
- Kernunnos (portrayed by Stuart Devenie) - Kernunnos is the horned god of Celtic polytheism. He is a nature god associated with fertility.
- Mephistopheles (portrayed by Anthony Ray Parker) - Mephistopheles was the King of Hell until he was killed by Xena and replaced by the Archangel Lucifer.
- Velasca (portrayed by Melinda Clarke) - Velasca served time as an Amazon queen after defeating her adoptive mother Queen Melosa for the crown. Also during her time as a deity, she dubs herself the "Goddess of Chaos".
- The One God - The One God, though never seen, is the ruler of Heaven and is usually represented through the Archangel Michael. Like Dahak, he is one of the original Gods. His connections with the birth of Jesus were shown in "A Star to Guide Them".

== Demigods ==
- Deon (portrayed by David Drew Gallagher) - Son of Aphrodite and Jacobus. He has the power to order people to follow his commands.
- Eryx the Boxer (portrayed by Jorge Gonzales) - The son of Aphrodite and King Butes. He is later killed by Hercules.
- Evander (portrayed by Rachel Ackerly and Rose Schicker) - Evander is the demigod son of Nemesis and Ares. His powers mainly consist of whatever he imagines turns into reality, which makes him a valuable asset for Ares. Zeus once used him to free Hera from Tartarus and Evander unknowingly released the Titans Helios and Oceanus.
- Hope (portrayed by Amy Morrison and Renee O'Connor) - The daughter of Dahak and Gabrielle, she possessed a link to the powers of Dahak, telekinesis and telepathy. She killed Solan, Xena's son. She and Ares have a monster child, which kills Hope when Gabrielle tricks the monster and stabs it.
- Morrigan (portrayed by Tamara Gorski) - She is the half god/half mortal counterpart to Hercules, appearing at first as evil, working as an assassin for the Irish Gods. Hercules quickly comes to understand why she is doing it and helps her to overcome her dark side and become the Druid of Justice.

== Strange World inhabitants ==
The inhabitants of the Strange World are the opposites of the normal reality:

- The Sovereign (portrayed by Kevin Sorbo) - In an alternate reality, Hercules became the tyrannical Sovereign and never became the people's champion upon being twisted down this path by his Cheiron. Following Dahak's defeat, Ares kills him before escaping the prison dimension. In scenes where Kevin Sorbo portrayed Hercules, the Sovereign was portrayed by Patrick Kake.
- Aphrodite II (portrayed by Alexandra Tydings) - In the alternate reality, Aphrodite is the Queen of the Olympian Gods.
- Ares II (portrayed by Kevin Smith) - In the alternate reality, Ares II is the God of Love.
- Falafel II (portrayed by Paul Norell) - In the alternate reality, Falafel was a chef who was considered the best. During Nebula II's reign, Falafel II hosted "Wheel of Misfortune," a twisted game show in which "contestants" were brutally killed for the enjoyment of the audience.
- Gabrielle II (portrayed by Renee O'Connor) - In the alternate reality, Gabrielle II was the Sovereign's executioner.
- Iolaus II (portrayed by Michael Hurst) - In the alternate reality, Iolaus was a court jester of the Sovereign who is secretly aligned to the rebels.
- Joxer II (portrayed by Ted Raimi) - In the alternate reality, Joxer is the leader of the resistance against the Sovereign.
- Nebula II (portrayed by Gina Torres) - At the time when Sovereign was missing, the alternate Nebula ruled her world and once collaborated with Ares to keep the Gods imprisoned sometime after Dahak's defeat.
- Xena II (portrayed by Lucy Lawless) - In the alternate reality, Xena was the Sovereign's lover.

== Titans ==
Xena's Titans: Hyperion, Thea and Crius

The following Titans appear in both shows:

- Atlas (portrayed by David Press) - Atlas was a field general for Cronus during the fight against the Gods. He was frozen in ice by Zeus, but later freed by Helios under Ares' orders. Hera accidentally turns Atlas to stone and now he holds up Mount Olympus.
- Crius (portrayed by Edward Campbell in the TV series, voiced by Ted Raimi in the animated movie) - Crius was one of the Titans who favored the humans. He was accidentally freed from his stone imprisonment by Gabrielle and later killed by Hyperion during an argument over the humans. In the animated movie, Crius appears with the depiction of a Wind Titan. He is portrayed as being extremely stupid and somewhat romantically linked to Mnemosyne. He is dark blue in color, with a light grey underbelly and hands and small horns. In some scenes he is portrayed as having a pot belly, and in others he is in good shape. His form is later altered by Hera using the Cronus Stone, giving him large wings, a very loud scream and other wind related abilities. This transformation leaves him as more of an animal than the others, walking on all fours and speaking in only screams. He is the least reluctant of the group to accept these new forms, going as far as to say in his sleep, "no, I don't want to change". He is the first of the group to be thrown into Tartarus.
- Cronus - Former ruler of the Titans. Cronus is the father of Zeus and thus the father of the Greek gods as well. He once took out one of his ribs (with the artifact now known as the Rib of Cronus) to dispose of his father Uranus. Cronus is defeated by Zeus shortly after the Titans defeat Dahak and is sentenced to an eternity in Tartarus.
- Gaia - The personification of Earth and the mother of the Titans. She is referred to several times, but never seen.
- Helios (portrayed by Phil Grieve) - A Titan who is the physical incarnation of the sun. He is among the Titans that Evander frees from Tartarus when he uses his powers to bring back Hera. Helios uses his powers to thaw Atlas from his frozen imprisonment. Helios and Oceanus are defeated by Hercules when he causes them to collide in their tornado forms.
- Hyperion (portrayed by Mark Raffety) - The Titan of the Sun. He was turned to stone by the Gods, but accidentally restored by Gabrielle.
- Mnemosyne (portrayed by Claire Stansfield in the TV series, voiced by Alison Wall in the animated film) - A fiery Titan who is trapped in a cave. Hercules seeks her out for advice on how to defeat Dahak. Aside from Zeus, she is the only living being to witness Dahak's first defeat and is accessible from the mortal realm. In the animated film, Mnemosyne appears as a fiery Titan with fiery hair who is freed by Hera. Hera later used the Cronus Stone to alter her form to having brown hair, beast-like legs, a devil-like tail, and markings on her face. Iolaus defeated her and Tethys by causing them to collide and drift into Tartarus.
- Oceanus (portrayed by Andrew Kovacevich) - A Titan who personifies the oceans. He is among the Titans that Evander frees from Tartarus when he uses his powers to bring back Hera. Helios and Oceanus are defeated by Hercules when he causes them to collide in their tornado forms.
- Porphyrion (voiced by David Mackie) - In the animated movie, Porphyrion is depicted as a Titan that has the element of Earth. He was freed from Tartarus by Hera and seeks to claim the Cronus Stone. Hercules runs into him and is allowed to go free as he isn't defending the Olympian Gods. When Hera uses the Cronus Stone to alter the Titans' appearances, Porphyrion's form is altered to appear with horns, empty wings, and one large "trunk" instead of legs. He manages to steal the Cronus Stone from Hera and shrink her with it. With help from Gabrielle's eagle form, Hercules sends Porphyrion back into Tartarus.
- Prometheus (portrayed by Mark Ferguson and John Freeman) - A Titan who gave fire to the humans. Hera stole a torch from his lair causing all the fire to slowly die out. Prometheus was later trapped by Hera to rob humanity of his gift of fire and healing. He was freed by the joint effort of Xena and Hercules.
- Tethys (voiced by Alison Wall) - A female Titan that appears in the animated movie. She is a watery Titan who is the most humanoid of the four Titans. Hera later used the Cronus Stone to alter Tethys' appearance which gave her a mermaid-like fin that sprouts octopus tentacles instead of legs. Unlike the other Titans, she is pleased with her makeover. Iolaus defeats her and Mnemosyne by causing them to collide and drift into Tartarus.
- Thea (portrayed by Amanda Tollemacke) - A female Titan associated with sight and shining light of the clear blue sky. She was turned to stone by the Gods, but accidentally restored by Gabrielle.
- Typhon (portrayed by Glenn Shadix) - An extremely gentle giant and the husband of Echidna. Typhon is first seen being rescued by Hercules from his imprisonment inflicted by Hera. Hercules managed to reunite him with Echidna. Typhon is shown to have a twin brother named Typhoon.
- Typhoon (portrayed by Glenn Shadix) - The twin brother of Typhon. This Titan lives in a cloud castle and abducts a human woman named Leanna to be his bride. He and Leanne live together guarding the last three unhatched Harpy eggs.

== Mythological creatures ==
- Angel - The Angels are the common inhabitants of Heaven.
- Antaeus (portrayed by Mark Newnham) - An Earth Giant who is the son of Poseidon and Gaia. He guards the shortcut to Mount Aethion and collects skulls of those who dare to trespass his domain. Antaeus was considered invincible, for he gathers his strength from the ground. With Deianeira's help, Hercules was able to defeat him and left his remains on top of his "trophies".
- Arachne (portrayed by Josephine Davison) - A half-woman, half-spider creature. In this show, Arachne was once a queen who didn't want her daughter to upstage her beauty and had her drowned in the ocean. Zeus turned her into a half-woman half-spider creature and banished her to a deserted island in the Charybdian Sea. When a shipload of pirates landed on the island to bury their treasure, Arachne began to kill them. She laid eggs inside their bodies, planning to grow an army of spiders to rule over. Hercules and Iolaus landed on the island shortly after the pirates and with the help of the pirate captain Nebula, they defeated Arachne by burning her and her webs.
- Archangel - The Archangels are the fighting forces of Heaven. Some Archangels are recruited from exceptional souls that must pass a grueling test of moral conviction. Others are born from the Lights of the Powers Above. The Archangels are more powerful than Demigods and a few of them possess enough power to rival the Gods. The Archangels resemble the Guardian Angels, but have black wings with emerald streaks on them and wear elaborate plate armors.
  - Lucifer (portrayed by Alex Mendoza in the first appearance, Joel Tobeck in the second appearance) - An Archangel that Michael sent to trap Xena in Hell. Due to the machinations of Xena, Lucifer was transformed into the new King of Hell following Mephistopheles' death.
  - Michael (portrayed by Charles Mesure) - The Commander of the Archangels. He once released the Four Horsemen from their seals and ran afoul of Hercules, Iolaus, and Ares. After Hercules sacrifices himself to stop Death, Michael reveals that it was a test to determine if mankind can survive. Michael then returned Hercules and Iolaus to the living. Michael later encountered Xena and Gabrielle when they were crucified by Julius Caesar and sent to Heaven. He helped Xena rescue Gabrielle from Hell and reunited a reformed Callisto with her family.
- Archdemon - A race of elite demons that live in Hell.
- Ares Monster (portrayed by Mark Newnham, voiced by Al Chalk) - A full-armored monster associated with Ares. In the toyline, it was immortalized as "Ares."
- Ares' Snake - A giant snake that guards the Urn of Zeus in Ares' Cave.
- Argo - A palomino horse, and the cavalry horse of Xena. Argo can sense danger, use martial arts, and issue commands to other horses. During the 25 year sleep of Xena and Gabrielle, Joxer would ride Argo to find them until Argo died of old age. Before Argo died, she had a daughter whom Joxer named Argo II.
- Argo II - During the 25 year sleep, Argo died of old age and had a daughter whom Joxer named after Argo and never let anyone ride her. When Xena returns, Argo II is her new Cavalry horse.
- Armor of Hephaestus - A group of living armors that were forged by Hephaestus. In "Love Takes a Holiday," Iolaus fights a group of these armors.
- Bacchae - The bloodthirsty vampire slaves of Bacchus.
- Banshee - A race of shade-like beings.
- Blue Serpent - A sea serpent that works for the Blue Priest and Hera. It swallowed Deianeira and Hercules when they were en route to Troy. Hercules managed to kill the Blue Serpent by wrapping himself around the Blue Serpent's heart.
- Braxus (voiced by an uncredited Lucy Lawless) - A young dragon that was used by Adamis. Braxus was being controlled by Adamis' lies that Hercules killed his mother. When Braxus meets Hercules and Iolus, they try to convince Braxus that they didn't kill her. When Adamis and his men battle Hercules and Iolus, Adamis admits that he killed Braxus' mother. Furious upon hearing this, Braxus engulfs Adamis in a fireball and befriends Hercules and Iolus.
- Centaurs - A race of creatures that are part human and part horse.
  - Cassius (portrayed by Julian Arahanga) - A centaur and student of Ceridian. He was angered by the discrimination against Centaurs that was rampant in Greece and plotted to go to war with the local humans when they and their magistrate Gredor wouldn't let the centaurs drink from the town fountain.
  - Ceridian (portrayed by Tony Blackett) - An elderly centaur who was a teacher and mentored many important students including Hercules, Jason, Asclepius, and Theseus. Ceridian was a father figure to Hercules whenever Zeus was unavailable to him. Hercules once told him that he was the best father anyone could have. When Ceridian was dying, he asked Hercules to help him with Cassius who was about to bring war to the local village. Hercules managed to stop the war and Cassius, Hercules, and Theseus were all present when Ceridian died. In Greek mythology, the actual trainer of Hercules was Chiron.
  - Cheiron (portrayed by Nathaniel Lees) - A centaur that is a great and powerful warrior. He opened up Cheiron's academy to train young warriors. Cheiron had many famous students including Jason of Corinth, Hercules, Iolaus, and Yvenna. When it came to the Hercules: The Legendary Journeys episode "The Academy," it was mentioned that Cheiron is dead.
  - Deric (portrayed by Peter Muller) - A centaur who worked on a farm that was owned by Penelope's father in Nespa. In "The Wedding of Alcmene", Deric later attended the wedding of Jason and Alcmene. He couldn't bring Lyla and Kefo with him as they were visiting his cousin Phantes. During the ceremony, Deric recognized Sera as a spy of Hera's at the Slaughter of Biblos and warned Hercules as Perfidia attacked.
  - Kaleipus (portrayed by Paul Gittins in "Orphan of War" and "Past Imperfect," Jeff Boyd in "Maternal Instincts") - A noble centaur who was a good friend of Kaleipus. He wears an eyepatch over his left eye ever since Borias deflected Xena's dagger towards it. After Borias died, Xena left the newborn Solan in his care. Kaleipus didn't tells Solan that Xena was his biological mother; instead he told him his mother was killed by Borias. Xena later helped Kaleipus and Solan against Dagnine.
  - Kefor (portrayed by James Croft) - A young centaur who is the son of Deric and Lyla.
  - Nemis (portrayed by Cliff Curtis) - A centaur who was the twin brother of Nessus. He wanted revenge on Hercules for the death of Nessus. Nemis was later killed in a cave-in when he sacrificed his life to hold up the cave ceiling so that Hercules could get out.
  - Nessus (portrayed by Cliff Curtis) - A centaur who was a farmhand for Hercules and Deianeira. He has a twin brother named Nemis. Nessus tried to rape Deianeira and was shot by an arrow by Hercules. As he laid dying with his blood getting on Deaneira's dress, Nessus prayed to Hera to make the blood on Deianeira's dress poisonous.
  - Phantes (portrayed by Colin Moy) - A noble centaur and son of Tildus who was framed for the murder of the Amazon Terreis. Phantes was later killed by the Mitoan dogs during the Thessalian and Mitoan Civil War. In "The Wedding of Alcmene", Phantes was mentioned to be Deric's cousin.
  - Tildus (portrayed by David Ashton) - A centaur commander who is the father of Phantes. He once fought Xena's army.
- Cerberus - A three-headed dog that is the son of Echidna and Typhon. He guards the entrance to the Underworld to prevent the living from entering and the dead from leaving.
- Cloud Serpent - A giant snake that lived in the clouds outside of Typhon's castle.
- Cyclopes - A race of one-eyed giants.
  - Cyclops of Traycus (portrayed by Richard Moll) - This Cyclops was picked on in his youth by the people of Traycus as seen in "Eye of the Beholder." He was brought in by Castor who used him to guard Hera's Sacred Vineyard. The Cyclops was defeated by Hercules who couldn't bring himself to vanquish the Cyclops. The villagers became more friendly towards the Cyclops when he helps Hercules defeat Hera's Executioners where Hercules even threw the Cyclops enough to crush the Chief Executioner.
  - Conjunctivus (portrayed by Patrick Wilson) - A Cyclops that was blinded by Xena during her warlord days.
  - Polyphemus - A Cyclops who is the son of Poseidon. In the Xena: Warrior Princess episode "Ulysses," Xena learned during dialogue between her, Ulysses, and Poseidon that Odysseus blinded Polyphemus.
- Demon - A race of creatures that live in Hell.
- Destroyers - Six monstrous creatures that are the children of Ares and Hope.
- Dryad - A race of winged creatures that guard the lair of Bacchus.
- Echidna (portrayed by Bridget Hoffman) - Echidna is the infamous Mother of All Monsters. She was married to Typhon, but Hera trapped him. Echidna became evil and used her children for the same purpose and Hercules was forced to kill them all. Echidna took it upon herself to kill Hercules in front of his mother Alcmene so Alcmene could see how it feels. Echidna turns good when Typhon is brought back to her.
- The Fates - The Fates are the embodiment and manifestation of fate itself. It was the Fates that first warned Zeus of the "Twilight of the Gods."
  - Clotho (portrayed by Rebecca Kopacka, Leah Mizrahi, and Samantha Adriaanse) - A young girl who spins the thread representing a life.
  - Lachesis (portrayed by Chloe Jordan and Micaela Daniel) - A motherly figure who measures the thread.
  - Atropos (portrayed by Elizabeth Pendergrast) - A crone who cuts the thread to end a life.
- Four Horsemen - Four skeletal horsemen that represent War, Famine, Pestilence, and Death. They were once used by the Archangel Michael in a plot to end the world. When Hercules sacrifices himself to stop Death, Michael states that this was a test to see if humanity can be given another chance, in which Hercules succeeded. The Four Horsemen were assumed to have been resealed afterwards.
  - War - The Horseman who engineers a massive and bloody battle between the armies of King Lineus and King Valtel.
  - Famine - The Horseman who engineers a massive famine.
  - Pestilence - The Horseman who engineers a massive plague.
  - Death - The Horseman who would kill all of humanity.
- Furies - The Furies are creatures that invoke retribution on anyone that does any wrongdoing.
  - Alecto (portrayed by Asa Lindh) - The leader of the Furies. She deems Xena guilty of the charges and drives her insane.
  - Tisiphone (portrayed first by Celi Foncesca and later by Annmarie Dennis) - Member of the Furies.
  - Megaera (portrayed first by Graciele Heredia and later by Smeta Choto) - Member of the Furies
- Ghidra - A two-headed, fire-breathing reptile creature with a scorpion-like tail that is one of Hera's "pets." In the event that its tail was cut off, it would grow back. It attacked many villages before being slain by a younger Hercules, Iolaus, and Jason.
- Giant - The Mediterranean Giants are much like humans, but are larger and stronger. Giants can measure up to 15 to 20 ft. and weigh about 2800 pounds.
  - Gareth (portrayed by Jim Ngaata) - A Giant who was responsible for killing Goliath's family. He was later killed by Xena who avenged Goliath's family.
  - Gargan (portrayed by Onno Boelee) - A Giant who attacked a town in Hercules and the Lost Kingdom where he was looking for Hercules. Gargan is killed by Hercules using Gargan's own club against him.
  - Goliath (portrayed by Todd Rippon) - A Giant that encountered Xena during her time as a warlord. Goliath's family was previously killed by Gareth. He was later killed by David of the Israelites as he tells Xena to avenge his family. In "A Day in the Life," Xena accomplishes Goliath's dying wish by slaying Gareth.
  - Talos (portrayed by Shane Dawson) - In this show, Talos is an ordinary giant who was in the employ of Ares where he guarded the Golden Fleece. He was later killed by Hercules.
- Golden Hinds - In this show, the Golden Hind is a golden creature that is part female human and part deer. Their blood is poisonous to Gods.
  - Hellene (portrayed by Amber Sainsbury) - A Golden Hind and a devotee of Artemis that Hercules met in his youth.
  - Serena (portrayed by Sam Jenkins and Kara Zediker) - Serena was the last of the Golden Hinds. She was turned into a human by Ares. Hercules fell in love with Serena and gave up his powers so he could marry her. She was murdered by Ares and Strife. When Autolycus used the Cronus stone to bring Hercules back in time, he saw how Serena was brought into Ares' services after her family was killed by Zeus. When Serena was wounded by Ares' dagger, Hercules strangled Ares and forced him to eliminate Serena's Golden Hind side making her completely human. When Hercules returned to the present, Serena was married to someone else.
- Graegus - The Dog of War who is a pet of Ares.
- Grindl - A creature that created from The Ring.
- Guardian Angel - The Guardian Angels are recruited from the souls or the occasional living being that arrive in Heaven.
  - Laura (portrayed by Angela Gribben) - Xena's Guardian Angel.
  - Leif (portrayed by David de Lautour) - Gabrielle's Guardian Angel.
- Harpies - A race of monsters that attacked Leanna's village. The villagers made a deal with Hades to withdraw the Harpies to the Underworld if Leanna would go live with Typhoon.
  - Fee - A Harpy that was born in Typhoon's cloud castle.
  - Fie - A Harpy that was born in Typhoon's cloud castle.
  - Foe-Fum - A Harpy that was born in Typhoon's cloud castle.
- Hydra - A Polycephaly serpent that is said to be spawned from the "Infernal Regions." The Lernaean Hydra is the daughter of Echidna and Typhon. She was killed by Hercules and Iolaus. In "Pride Comes Before a Brawl," Iolaus finds another one in a cave near Thrace. This Hydra is left alive due to a lack of fire to burn the wounds.
- Krafstar (portrayed by Marton Csokas) - A human who has a demon form called the Deliverer (performed by Anthony Ray Parker, but also voiced by Marton Csokas). He is associated with a cult that worships Dahak and once tricked Gabrielle into thinking that he is associated with the One God. He was killed when Xena threw him into Dahak's flames.
- Lead Bounty Hunter (performed by Julian Arahanga) - A creature that works for Hera. It led a bunch of bounty hunters to look for Hercules and a group of homeless people who are heading to Calydon. Hercules defeated the Lead Bounty Hunter and his men who then exploded. In the toyline, the Lead Bounty Hunter was immortalized as "Mole Man."
- Mandragora Lizard - A lizard-like creature that sprouts from the roots of a mandrake.
- Mermaid - A creature that is half-woman, half-fish.
  - Nautica (portrayed by Angela Dotchin) - A mermaid who is the daughter of Triton. Poseidon gave Nautica a heart so pure that it warms the oceans.
- Mesomorph - The Mesomorph is a monster that was once a man. In "Let the Games Begin," Ares turned several Elean soldiers into Mesomorphs in order to fight Hercules at the Olympian Games.
- Metal Panther - A metallic panther that was forged by Hephaestus. In "Love Takes a Holiday", Iolaus fought and defeated the panther in defense of his grandmother Leandra.
- Minotaur - A creature with the head of a bull and the body of a man.
  - Gryphus (performed by Anthony Ray Parker, voiced by Al Chalk) - The son of Zeus who was once a man and said to be more handsome than Adonis. When he began to lead people away from the worship of the Olympians and killed those who opposed him, Zeus punished him by turning him into a Minotaur and imprisoning him in a Labyrinth in Alturia. Gryphus remained imprisoned for one hundred years until Andius and Danion accidentally set him free. Gryphus was bent on revenge and in order to hurt Zeus, he targeted Hercules. Hercules had to kill Gryphus to prevent him from killing any more people. When Gryphus charged toward Hercules after mentioning that he is Hercules' half-brother, Hercules was unable to fight back. After Gryphus threatened to kill Iolaus, Hercules threw Gryphus onto a stalagmite, impaling him as Zeus arrived. Zeus states that Gryphus was already dead when he started to lead people away from the Olympians and that it didn't have to end this way. When Gryphus asks Zeus not to let him die like this, Zeus changes Gryphus back into a human upon his death as Gryphus' dead body disappears into the mist.
  - Hera's Minotaur (performed by Anthony Ray Parker) - A Minotaur that was created by Hera in "The Sword of Veracity." There was a second Minotaur (performed by Shane Dawson) that Hera also created to be the assistant of this Minotaur. Hercules and Iolaus manage to outsmart and defeat both Minotaurs by tricking them into killing each other.
- Mummy (performed by Mark Newnham) - The mummy of the ancient ruler Ishtar.
- Nemean Lion - Hercules had once slain this monster and still had its pelt in his possession.
- Obie - Short for Obstetrius, Obie is the offspring of Echidna and Typhon. Echidna didn't want to give him to Hera after what happened to her other children. Klepto kidnapped Obie, intending to give him to Warlord Bluth for the same reasons. However, in the time Klepto and Obie were together, they grew fond of one another. Once Klepto apologized for his wrongdoing, Echidna and Typhon accepted him as Obie's babysitter.
- Perfidia - A giant sea serpent used by the Blue Priest to kill Hercules at the wedding of Jason and Alcmene. Hercules managed to kill the Perfidia from within by severing its spine.
- Primord - A race of hominids that are a cross between man and beast. A tribe of Primords lived near Zebron where they were befriended by Tarlus. Several of these were executed by King Beraeus when he was searching for Ramina. Primords were capable of making guttural sounds, but not of speech.
- Pyro (portrayed by Daniel Batton) - A fire monster summoned by Hera and given to her disciple Zandar to use against Hercules. Hercules was able defeat him by capturing him in a barrel and cutting off his supply of oxygen.
- Sand Rays - A race of stingray-like creatures that live in the sands of a deserted island.
- Sand Shark - A deadly creature that lives in the sands of the island Golgoth.
- Satyr - A creature with the upper body of a human and the legs of a goat.
  - Cheiron (portrayed by Kevin Atkinson) - An immortal Satyr who was a friend of Hercules. He was left with a debilitating mortal wound across his stomach after accidentally being struck by Hercules' sword. After many journeys to find a cure, Hercules managed to finally cure Cheiron of his wounds with the Circle of Fire which rendered him human. His name is not to be confused with the centaur Cheiron.
  - Clarin and Cletis (portrayed by Darren Warren and Daniel Warren) - Twin Satyrs who once swindled Pyturis in a drinking contest when he wasn't looking where one of them would take the other's place. Their trick did not work on Hercules.
- She-Demon (portrayed by Nicky Mealings) - A female monster who serves Hera. She resembles a human woman from the waist up, and has a cobra/rattlesnake body and tail. She is the daughter of Echidna and Typhon. She-Demon wears a long dress and lures men close with promises of love. Once they step onto her dress, she stabs them with the tip of her tail and turns them to stone. Hercules dodges the tail and it turns the She-Demon to stone, turning her victims back to normal.
- Sirens - A race of women with beautiful singing voices. Poseidon enlisted them to use their voices on Ulysses.
- Skeleton Warriors - A bunch of Skeletons that work for Hera. They were summoned by Marcus to fight the Argonauts when the heroes returned from their second expedition. The Skeleton Warriors were all defeated by Hercules, Jason, and the Argonauts.
- Stymphalian Bird - A bird-like creature that is the offspring of Echidna and Typhon. Hera corrupted it to serve her and terrorize Stymphalian Swamp. It attacked Hercules and a group of homeless people while they are heading to Calydon. Hercules defeated the Stymphalian Bird by throwing it into the quicksand.
- Subterranean Serpent - An underground serpent that lives in an abandoned castle in Cyros after its inhabitants fled from it.
- Valkyries - Female Warriors with supernatural powers who work for the Norse god Odin.
  - Grinhilda - Once the leader of the Valkyries, she transformed into a monster when Xena forced her to wear the ring forged by the Rhinegold. She was pregnant at the time and her baby Grindl transformed into a monster as well. She returns as commander to Odin's army after Xena changes her back into a Valkyrie.

== Modern mortals ==
- Kevin Sorbo (portrayed by himself) - The actor who portrays Hercules and is secretly the real Hercules which he conceals from his fellow workers as he keeps quoting "I'm just an actor."
- Alex Kurtzman (portrayed by Ted Raimi) - A writer at Renaissance Pictures.
- Annie Day (portrayed by Lucy Lawless) - Thought herself to be the reincarnation of Xena, but was actually a reincarnation of Joxer the Mighty. Ares later corrected this by swapping the souls.
- B.S. Hollinsfoffer (portrayed by Robert Trebor) - The fictional head of Universal Studios that the workers at Renaissance Pictures answer to.
- Beth Hymson (portrayed by Gina Torres) - A casting director for Renaissance Pictures.
- David Scott Pollison (portrayed by Joel Tobeck) - An office assistant for Renaissance Pictures.
- Eric Gruendemann (portrayed by Willy De Wit) - An on-set producer for Renaissance Pictures.
- Harry O'Casey (portrayed by Ted Raimi) - A dentist who is romantically involved with Annie. He later revealed to be the true reincarnation of Xena. Ares later corrected this by swapping their souls.
- Jack Kleinman (portrayed by Ted Raimi) - A descendant of Joxer in the 1940s.
- Janice Covington (portrayed by Renee O'Connor) - An archaeologist in the 1940s.
- Jerry Patrick Brown (portrayed by Kevin Smith) - A writer and producer of Hercules: The Legendary Journeys who has an affinity for paintball.
- John Smythe (portrayed by Mark Ferguson) - An archaeologist in the 1940s.
- Liz Friedman (portrayed by Hudson Leick) - A producer and writer for Hercules: The Legendary Journeys. She hired Alex Kurtzman and Roberto Orci due her being their babysitter when they were young.
- Mattie Merrill (portrayed by Renee O'Connor) - A psychologist who is the reincarnation of Gabrielle.
- Norma Bates (portrayed by Tamara Gorski) - A member of Renaissance Pictures' security force.
- Melinda Pappas (portrayed by Lucy Lawless) - A linguist and translator in the 1940s.
- Melissa Blake (portrayed by Lisa Chappell) - The assistant of Robert Tapert.
- Paul Robert Coyle (portrayed by Michael Hurst) - A writer for Hercules: The Legendary Journeys.
- Robert Tapert (portrayed by Bruce Campbell) - The producer at Renaissance Pictures and the executive producer of Hercules: The Legendary Journeys.
- Roberto Orci (portrayed by Paul Glover) - A writer at Renaissance Pictures.
- Ted Kleinman (portrayed by Ted Raimi) - A Hollywood television developer and the grandson of Jack Kleinman.

== See also ==
- Greek mythology
- Roman mythology
- Similarities between Roman, Greek, and Etruscan mythologies
