= Monster Ark =

American television movie

- Promotional poster
- Written by: Berkeley Anderson; Declan O'Brien
- Directed by: Declan O'Brien
- Starring: Renee O'Connor; Tim DeKay
- Theme music composer: Claude Foisy
- Country of origin: United States
- Original language: English

Production
- Producers: Jeffery Beach; Phillip J. Roth; Thomas P Vitale
- Cinematography: Anton Bakarski
- Editor: Matt Michael
- Running time: 84 minutes
- Production company: Sci Fi Pictures

Original release
- Network: Sci Fi Channel
- Release: August 9, 2008

Monster Ark is a television film that first aired on the Sci-Fi Channel on August 9, 2008. It was directed by Declan O'Brien and Renee O'Connor, Tim DeKay and Tommy Lister starred.

== Plot ==
An archaeologist team finds what appears to be new undiscovered Dead Sea Scrolls in the Qumran Ruins, Israel. The scrolls are that of a much earlier Book of Genesis that claims that Noah had an ark before the famous Noah's Ark which was used to store the only surviving Nephilim. When they find this ark though, they have released it into the world, and the only way to stop it is to use Noah's Staff.

== Cast ==
- Tim DeKay as Dr. Nicholas Zavaterro
- Renee O'Connor as Dr. Ava Greenway
- Tommy 'Tiny' Lister as Sergeant Major Gentry (credited as Tommy Lister Jr.)
- Amanda Crew as Joanna
- Carlos Leon as Belus
- Bill Parks as Russell
- Richard Gnolfo as Wilson
- Tommy Nohilly as Coles
- Vlado Mihailov as Martinez (credited as Vlado Mihaylov)
- Mike Straub as Hutch (credited as Michael Straub)
- Stefan Shterev as Insurgent #1 (credited Stefan Shtereff)
- Bashar Rahal as Insurgent #2 (credited as Bashar Rahad)
- Hristo Mitzkov as Belus' Lieutenant (credited as Hristo Motzkov)
- George Zlatarev as Captain Backhar
- Velislav Pavlov as Laborer
- Dan Yarmolyuk as Mr. Fasanella
- Chris Thompson as Mr. Windheim
- Todd Jensen as Cain
- Atanas Srebrev as Noah
