= Tsianina Joelson =

American actress

- Born: Tsianina Marie Means; January 16, 1975 (age 51); Coquille, Oregon, U.S.
- Other name: Tsianina Lohmann
- Occupations: Actress, Fitness Model, Fitness Contestant, Dance Instructor, Model
- Years active: 1993–2010
- Height: 5 ft 8 in (1.73 m)
- Spouses: Greg Joelson; Michael Lohmann

Tsianina Joelson, or Tsianina Lohmann (pronounced "Cha'-nee-na", born Tsianina Marie Means on January 16, 1975) is an American former actress, fitness model, and former beauty queen.

Joelson was born in 1975 in Coquille, Oregon to Ken and Betty Means. She was crowned Miss Coos County in 1993. She was married to fellow Oregonian Greg Joelson (played four games in NFL in 1991) when she won Fitness America's Miss Fitness USA competition in 1997. She married Michael Lohmann in 2004.

Joelson was the co-host of the short-lived summer 1998 MTV series The Daily Burn. Her most recognized movie role is for the 2000 film Bring It On, where she played wealthy cheerleader Darcy. From 2000-2001 she also had four appearances in the role of Varia, an Amazon, on Xena: Warrior Princess in the 6th and final season.

== Filmography ==
=== Film ===
Year	Title	Role	Notes
2000	Boys and Girls	Girl in Bar	
2000	Bring It On	Darcy	
2000	Held for Ransom	Marianne Donovan	
2001	American Pie 2	Amy	
2001	I Shaved My Legs for This	Adrienne	
2001	Girl's Best Friend	Sandra Lacy	
2005	The Rain Makers	Karen	
2009	According to Greta	Stacy	

=== Television ===
Year	Title	Role	Notes
1998	Malibu, CA	Megan	"Scott's Old Girlfriend"
2000	Zoe, Duncan, Jack and Jane	Maja	"My Dinner with Abby"
2000-2001	Xena: Warrior Princess	Varia	Recurring role
2001	Special Unit 2	Julie	"The Skin"
2001	Men, Women & Dogs	Angie	"A Bulldog Scorned"
2001	CSI: Crime Scene Investigation	Megan Treadwell	"Caged"
2004	Hollywood Division	Dana Cassidy	TV film

== See also ==
- List of female fitness & figure competitors
