= Alexandra Tydings =

American actress

- Born: Alexandra Huntingdon Tydings; Washington, D.C., U.S.
- Education: Brown University
- Occupations: Actress; director; producer; writer
- Years active: 1993 – 2008, 2018

Alexandra Huntingdon Tydings is an American actress, director, writer, producer, and activist, best known for her role as Greek Goddess Aphrodite on the television series Hercules: The Legendary Journeys and its spin-off, Xena: Warrior Princess.

== Personal life ==
Alexandra Tydings was born in Washington, D.C. She has four half-sisters and one half-brother, and is the daughter of former Maryland U.S. Senator Joseph Tydings and his second wife, Terry Lynn Huntingdon Tydings; she is the granddaughter of former Maryland U.S. Senator Millard Tydings. She is a graduate of Sidwell Friends School and Brown University, with a degree in film and critical theory. She speaks English, French and Spanish.

Tydings counts Katharine Hepburn and Kevin Spacey among her favorite actors. She told Whoosh, a Xena fansite, that she most enjoys the research and collaborating process of acting and that auditioning is her least favorite part of theater arts. She competed in Irish dancing as a child, and performed with The Royal Ballet of London at the Kennedy Center. Dance led to performance of all kinds; in addition to acting, she was the singer and bassist of bands Annabelle Kickbox and She's Seen You Naked.

Whoosh points out that Tydings maintained a vegetarian diet for 14 years, and that she enjoys gardening.

== Career ==
After graduating from Brown University, Tydings moved to Hollywood to pursue an acting career. In her first major feature film, she played opposite Woody Harrelson in Oscar winner Michael Cimino's The Sunchaser (1996), which premiered at the Cannes Film Festival. She has since performed in dozens of roles in film, television and theater, including six years as a series regular on Xena: Warrior Princess and Hercules: The Legendary Journeys where she played Aphrodite, the Greek Goddess of love.

In 2015, Tydings wrote and directed The Trial of Hanna Porn, a multi-media piece on abortion, which won the Best of Fringe award at the Charm City Fringe Festival. She then went on to write, direct and produce Rainbow Bridge, an independent film about two women advocating for abortion in the United States.

== Filmography ==
Film and television
Year	Title	Role	Notes
1993	Alice	Alice	
1993	Angst	Rebel Girl	
1993	Queerbait	Arial	
1993	Walking on Sunshine		TV pilot
1993	Red Shoe Diaries	Cecelia; Lynn	Episode: "Love at First Sight"; Episode: "Burning Up"
1995	Vanishing Son	Tina	Episode: "Win, Place or Dead"
1996	The Sunchaser	Victoria Reynolds	
1996-1999	Hercules: The Legendary Journeys	Aphrodite	9 episodes
1997	Party of Five	Kerry	Episode: "Handicaps"
1997-2001	Xena: Warrior Princess	Aphrodite	11 episodes
1998	Hercules and Xena – The Animated Movie: The Battle for Mount Olympus	Aphrodite (voice)	Video
1998	Hercules: The Legendary Journeys	Katherine (voice)	Episode: "Porkules"
1998	Hercules: The Legendary Journeys	Katherine	Episode: "One Fowl Day"
1998	Hotel del Sol	Nina	TV pilot
1999	Dodge's City	Cricket	TV pilot
2001	Sheena	Elena	Episode: "The Treasure of Sienna Mende"
2002	Another Pretty Face	Jill Trent	TV movie
2008	The Wire	Arts Editor	Episode: "React Quotes"
