= Gabrielle (Xena: Warrior Princess) =

Fictional human female

- Renee O'Connor as Gabrielle
- First appearance: Sins of the Past (1995)
- Last appearance: A Friend in Need, part 2 (2001)
- Created by: Robert Tapert
- Portrayed by: Renee O'Connor

In-universe information
- Species: Human
- Occupation: Warrior, bard
- Affiliation: Xena, Lila, Joxer, Eli, Perdicas, the Amazons
- Weapon: Staff, sai
- Children: Hope (daughter by Dahak)

Gabrielle is a fictional character played by Renee O'Connor in the American fantasy TV series Xena: Warrior Princess (1995–2001). She is referred to by fans as the Battling Bard of Potidaea. Her trademark weapons are the Amazon fighting staff and later, the sais. She was also an Amazon Princess and later an Amazon Queen. The character's development and progression is a story that spans the entire show's run, with her first appearance in "Sins of the Past" seeing her as a naive farm girl, and the final episode, "A Friend In Need (Part 2)", seeing her as a fully formed but rational warrior, set to follow in Xena's footsteps.

The dwarf planet Eris and its moon Dysnomia had the interim names "Xena" and "Gabrielle" until they were officially named. She was listed in AfterEllen.com's Top 50 Favorite Female TV Characters.

== Creation and production ==
O'Connor was chosen to play the role after she impressed producers with her performance in the Hercules television movie The Lost Kingdom.

In the two musical episodes, Gabrielle's singing voice was mainly provided by Susan Wood. (This may be because in another brief musical portion of the fourth season episode "If the Shoe Fits..", Renee O'Connor's voice sounded like that of an opera singer.) In the episode "Lyre, Lyre, Hearts on Fire", O'Connor sang the chorus in "War" and the rap lead in "Gettin' Ready".

Gabrielle is the French feminine form of the given name Gabriel, the Archangel, from the Hebrew meaning "messenger of God". The Greek transliteration of "Gabrielle" would be Γαβριέλα, (Gavriela). In Xena's Italian dub, the character was renamed "Olimpia."

== Character history ==
=== From farm girl to warrior ===
When Gabrielle first meets Xena, she is a farm girl living in the village of Potidaea. She and her sister, Lila, along with several other village girls, have been kidnapped by the men of the warlord, Draco, to be sold as slaves. Xena intervenes and rescues them. Awed by her fighting skills, Gabrielle decides that she wants to become a warrior too. She also wants to avoid the marriage that her parents, Herodotus and Hecuba, have arranged for her with her childhood friend Perdicas. Gabrielle insists on following an initially reluctant Xena on the road. The two women soon develop a strong bond of love and friendship.

=== The Battling Bard of Potidaea ===
Gabrielle starts the series as a young adult who more or less stands behind Xena, and relies on Xena to protect her. Later on in the series, she acquires a quarterstaff from the Greek Amazons and starts to use it as both a defensive and offensive weapon, displaying some skill in using the staff. As the series goes on, Gabrielle's skills with the staff continue to develop. In one episode, Gabrielle takes on numerous soldiers and single-handedly attempts to rescue Xena's presumed dead body. Two episodes later she is seen blocking an arrow in flight with her staff. Later on, Gabrielle also adds kicks and minor acrobatics to her fighting abilities. Under the tutelage of Xena, she becomes worthy of many foes.

While in India, Gabrielle is thrown through time by the Darsham, Naiyima to save Xena's soul. It is said that their souls are together throughout time. In this next life Xena is the Mother of Peace, Arminestra and Gabrielle is Shakti, a Warrior Prince of India. At the end of season 4, Gabrielle shows a leap in her warrior abilities. After months of following her path of the Way of Love, Gabrielle picks up the sword of a paralyzed Xena and fights off a large group of Roman soldiers, killing several of them. After her first kill in Season 3, she is forcibly impregnated by an evil god called Dahak, giving birth to a daughter whom she names Hope. It turns out that her child is evil and murderous. Xena and Gabrielle have a falling out when Hope (at the time having aged rapidly to nine years old over the course of three months) kills Xena's son Solan, and almost kill each other but are finally reconciled. Hope later returns as an adult twin of Gabrielle. Xena and Gabrielle sometimes antagonize each other and when Xena travels to China alone without Gabrielle to avenge her spiritual mentor, Lao Ma, she goes to China to stop Xena from carrying out her plan.

By season 5, Gabrielle starts to fight with her sai, incorporating more acrobatic abilities, such as performing a wall run and back flip. In addition to sai and sometimes a new casual staff, she can use a large array of weapons with proficiency. Gabrielle also fights against warriors with notable skill; she defeats the warrior Mavican and stands against Ares and Hades (two gods) in battle for a period of time, before they defeat her. She also fights in a sword duel with Brutus, Caesar's former right hand and one of the leaders of Rome, eventually killing him. Gabrielle's abilities throughout the series are noticed by the God of War who seeks her out as his new protégée. It is mentioned later by Gabrielle that Xena trained her throughout the years, although there have only been a few episodes that actually show Xena giving her any sort of martial arts training. One of Gabrielle's biggest fights in the series is her fight against fellow Amazon queen, Varia. They fight in an enclosed arena in a match in which Eve's life is at stake, and they appeared to be at a stand-off before she is beaten by Varia. Gabrielle takes the loss graciously and continues to grow in skill over the remaining season.

== Characterization ==
In the opening episode, she displays a remarkable ability to talk her way out of fearsome or difficult situations: she talks a Cyclops out of eating her, and makes an ally of him; talks an old man into giving her a lift; talks a violent crowd out of killing Xena; and talks her way into joining Xena as her traveling partner.

Besides her persuasive ability, she also reads and writes - rare skills for that time, loves to tell stories, and has some musical ability. As she travels with Xena, she records their adventures on a series of scrolls, with an eye for flair and drama. Occasionally her tendency to exaggerate and glamorize the facts gets her into trouble. She is also shown telling stories for money in an inn. In other episodes she wins a place in the Athens City Academy for Performing Bards, is a famous playwright, is a theatrical director, plays the pan pipes with considerable skill, and is the only person able to recite a magical scroll with the correct accents.

Despite Gabrielle's ascendancy as a warrior (in the episode "The Ides of March" she slew nine Roman legionaries), her role as a bard remains important. About a year into her travels with Xena, her scrolls about Xena's exploits begin to gain popularity, apparently helping, according to Ares, turn Xena into a legend. After their 25-year sleep, Gabrielle finds out that her stories had been read as far away as North Africa where they were popular among nomad tribes.

According to an episode set in modern times, Gabrielle's scrolls were preserved for thousands of years and discovered during World War II by modern archeologists who were descendants of Xena, Gabrielle, and Joxer. The scrolls found their way to Hollywood, where they formed the basis of the television series. This leads into an entire small story-arc in which the modern-day reincarnations of Xena, Gabrielle and Joxer meet and interact. Xena and Gabrielle's reincarnations pair up to make their own names for themselves, instead of living in their father's shadows. Joxer's reincarnation is a hardcore fan of the show.
