= Xena: Warrior Princess =

American fantasy television series (1995–2001)

- Opening sequence title card
- Genre: Sword and sorcery
- Created by: John Schulian; Robert Tapert
- Developed by: R.J. Stewart; Sam Raimi
- Starring: Lucy Lawless; Renee O'Connor
- Composer: Joseph LoDuca
- Country of origin: United States
- Original language: English
- No. of seasons: 6
- No. of episodes: 134 (list of episodes)

Production
- Executive producers: Robert Tapert; Sam Raimi
- Production location: New Zealand
- Running time: 45–48 minutes
- Production companies: Renaissance Pictures; Universal Television

Original release
- Network: Syndication
- Release: September 4, 1995 – June 18, 2001

Related
- Hercules: The Legendary Journeys; Young Hercules; Hercules and Xena – The Animated Movie: The Battle for Mount Olympus

Xena: Warrior Princess is an American sword-and-sorcery television series filmed in New Zealand, which aired in first-run syndication from September 4, 1995, to June 18, 2001. Critics have praised the series for its strong female protagonist, and it has acquired a strong cult following, attention in fandom, parody, and academia, and has influenced the direction of other television series.

Writer-director-producer Robert Tapert created the series in 1995 under his production tag, Renaissance Pictures, with executive producers R. J. Stewart (who developed the series along with Tapert) and Sam Raimi. The series narrative follows Xena (played by Lucy Lawless), an infamous warrior looking to be redeemed for her past sins against the innocent by using her formidable fighting skills to aid those who are defenseless. Her companion Gabrielle (played by Renee O'Connor) grows from a simple farm girl into an Amazon warrior and Xena's comrade-in-arms during the series; her initial naïveté helps to balance Xena and assists her in recognizing and pursuing the greater good. In 2012, star Lawless asserted that her character, Xena, was from "ancient Bulgaria, Thrace", when the character is stated in the series to come from the ancient Greek city of Amphipolis, which is located in the nearby region of Central Macedonia in modern Greece. However, at the time, Amphipolis was, in fact, a Thracian city which was inhabited by Greeks, so it is likely that she was Thracian by birth, and Greek by culture.

The show is a spin-off of the television series Hercules: The Legendary Journeys; the saga began with three episodes in Hercules in which Xena was a recurring character originally scheduled to die in her third appearance. Aware of the character's sudden popularity among the public, the producers of the series decided to launch a spin-off series based on her adventures. Xena became a successful show which has aired in more than 108 countries around the world since 1998. In 2004 and 2007, it ranked #9 and #10 on TV Guide's Top Cult Shows Ever and the title character ranked #100 on Bravo's 100 Greatest TV Characters. Xena's success has led to hundreds of tie-in products, including comics, books, video games and conventions, realized annually since 1998 in Pasadena, California, and in London.

The series overtook its predecessor in ratings and in popularity. In its second season, it became the top-rated syndicated drama series on American television. For all six years, Xena remained in the top five. Cancellation of the series was announced in October 2000, and the series finale aired in the summer of 2001. On August 13, 2015, NBC Entertainment chairman Bob Greenblatt said a Xena reboot was in development, with Raimi and Tapert returning as executive producers, with the show's debut sometime in 2016. Javier Grillo-Marxuach was hired as writer and producer for the reboot, but left the project in April 2017 because of creative differences. In August 2017, NBC announced that it had cancelled its plans for the reboot for the foreseeable future.

== Shooting locations ==
"In a time of ancient gods, warlords and kings, a land in turmoil cried out for a hero. She was Xena, a mighty princess forged in the heat of battle. The power, the passion, the danger. Her courage will change the world!"

— opening narration, read by Don LaFontaine.

Xena: Warrior Princess is set primarily in a fantasy version of ancient Greece (sometimes alluding to Roman Greece) and was filmed in New Zealand. Some filming locations are confidential, but many scenes were recorded in places such as the Waitākere Ranges Regional Park, part of the Auckland Regional parks often credited at the end of the episodes.

The Ancient Greece depicted in the show is largely derived from historical locations and customs, modifying known places and events – battles, trading routes, towns, and so on – to generate an attractive fictional world. The settlements are presented as a mixture of walled villages and rural hamlets set in a lush green, mountainous landscape. They are often seen under attack from warlords, and travelling between them involves frequent encounters with small bands of outlaws. All of the main towns are named after historic towns of Ancient Greece, and exhibit some of their essential characteristics – Amphipolis (birthplace of Xena), Potidaea (birthplace of Gabrielle), Athens (birthplace of Joxer), Corinth, Delphi, and Cirra (birthplace of Callisto) which was burnt to the ground by Xena's army.

As the show progressed, however, events took place throughout more modern times and places, from Cleopatra's Alexandria to Julius Caesar's Rome. The mythology of the show transitioned from that of the Olympian Gods to include Judeo-Christian elements. Eastern religions were touched on as well, disregarding concerns about the accuracy of the setting. One episode, "The Way", which loosely interpreted elements of Hinduism as major plot points, generated controversy, requiring the producers to add a disclaimer at the head of the episode and a tag explaining the episode's intentions at its end.

Mythological and supernatural locations are presented as equally real, physical places, often accessed through physical portals hidden in the landscape such as lakes and caves. They include the Elysian Fields, Tartarus, the River Styx, Valhalla, Heaven and Hell. The inhabitants of such places – gods, mythological beings and forces – are for the most part manifested as human characters who can move at will between their domains and the real world. Ares, the Greek God of War, for instance, is an egotistical man who wears studded black leather, and Aphrodite, Goddess of Love, is a California Valley girl who uses typical Valley girl slang and dresses in flowing, translucent pink gowns.

== Production ==
=== Series format ===
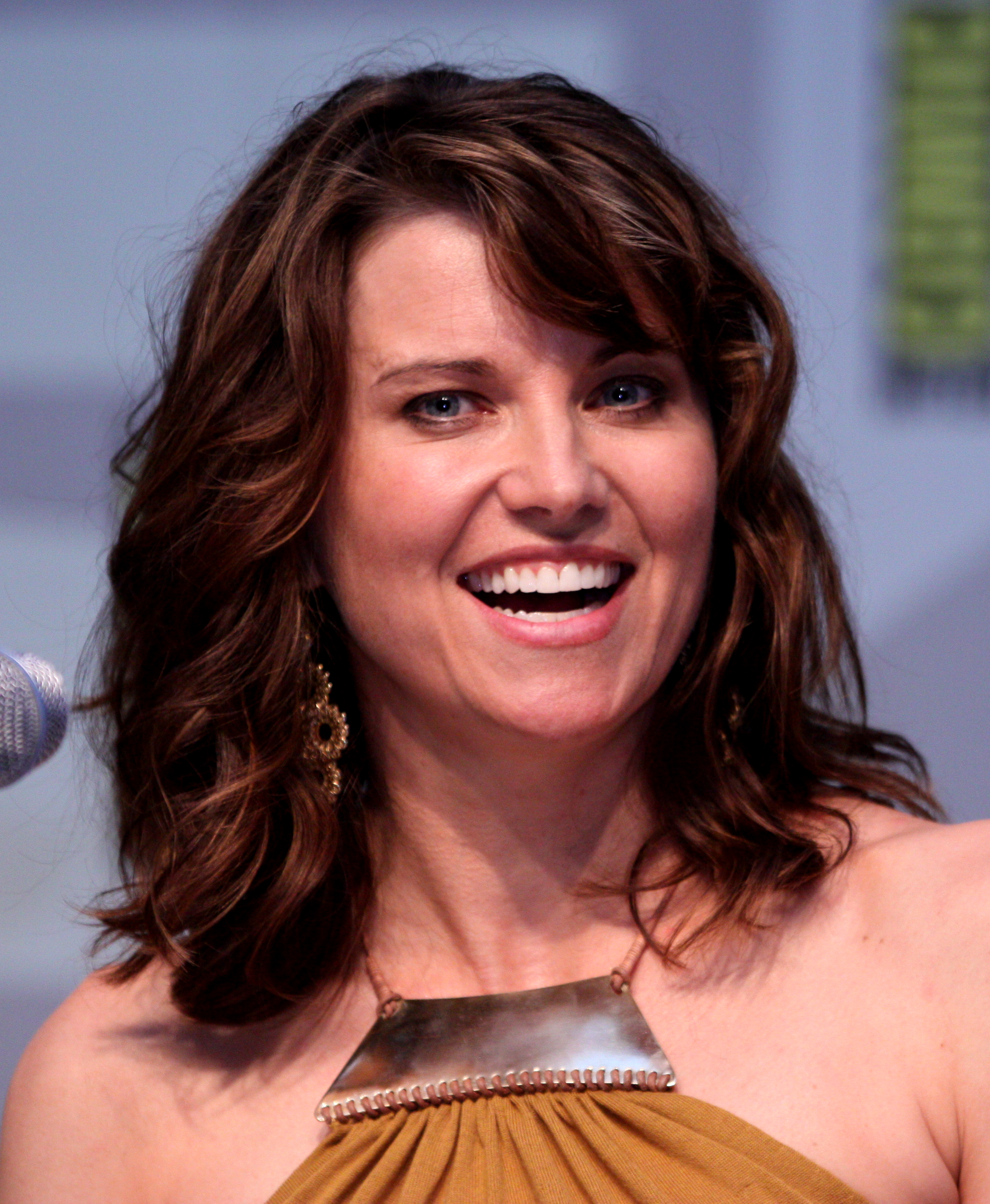
Lucy Lawless at the July 2010 San Diego Comic-Con

Xena is a historical fantasy set primarily in ancient Greece, although the setting is flexible in both time and location and occasionally features Egyptian, Indian, Chinese, Central Asian, and Medieval European elements. The flexible fantasy framework of the show accommodates a considerable range of theatrical styles, from high melodrama to slapstick comedy, from whimsical and musical to all-out action and adventure.

Xena freely borrows names and themes from various mythologies around the world, primarily the Greek, anachronistically adapting them to suit the demands of the storyline. Historical figures and events from several different historical eras and myths make numerous appearances, and the main characters are often credited with resolving important historical situations. These include an encounter with Homer before he was famous, in which Gabrielle encourages his storytelling aspirations; the fall of Troy; and the capture of Caesar by pirates, with Xena cast as the pirate leader.

Competing religions are treated as compatible and co-existent in a henotheistic world, allowing the Greek Pantheon to live side by side with the Norse gods, Indian Deities, the "God of Love" and others. Each god, or set of gods, controls a different part of the world, and (in the show) survives only while people believe in it. In seasons four and five, the Greek people gradually transfer their faith from the Greek gods to the "God of Love" over an approximate 25-year period, and as their power fades, the Greek gods are almost all killed off in a climactic battle.

It was one of the first shows to tap into its Internet following, allowing fans from all over the world to discuss and suggest things related to the show. The Xena fandom is still an active community today.

=== Casting ===
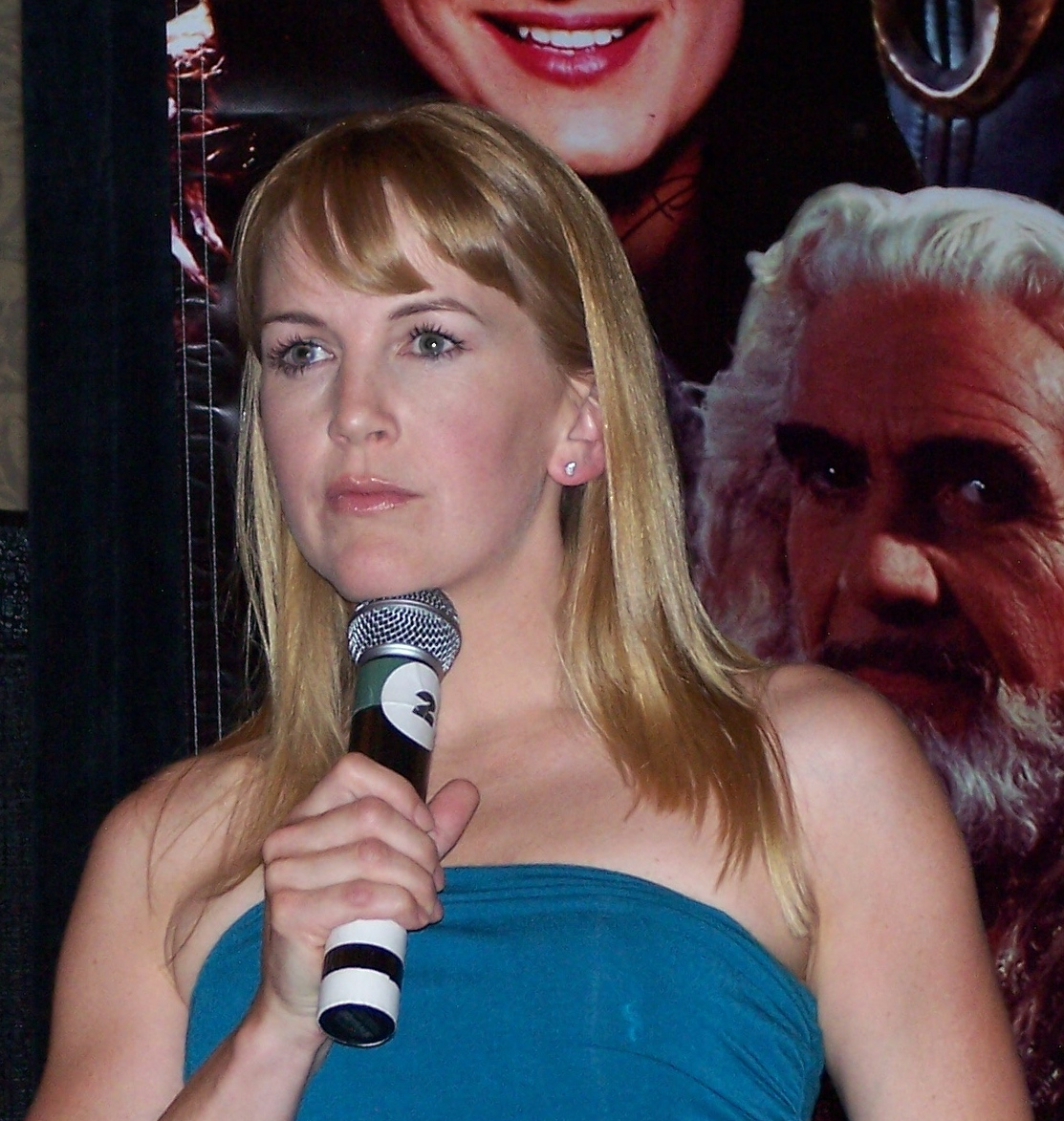
Renee O'Connor at the 2007 Xena Convention

Lucy Lawless was not initially chosen for the role of Xena, the first choice was the British actress Vanessa Angel, but an illness prevented her from travelling, and the role was offered to four other actresses before the relatively unknown Lawless. Lawless, a native of Auckland, was chosen for the titular role to film in her native land. Sunny Doench was cast as Gabrielle, but she did not want to leave her boyfriend in the United States, so Renee O'Connor, who had appeared in Hercules in another role, was chosen.

The show features a wide assortment of recurring characters, many of them portrayed by New Zealand actors. Ted Raimi became a core member of the cast from the second season as Joxer. Actor Kevin Smith played popular character Ares, god of War, and Alexandra Tydings played his counterpart Aphrodite, goddess of Love. Marton Csokas portrayed both Borias and Krafstar. Other notables included Karl Urban in a variety of roles such as Cupid and Caesar, Hudson Leick as Xena's nemesis Callisto (Leick also played a body-switched Xena in the episode "Intimate Stranger"), Claire Stansfield as the evil shamaness Alti, and a number of trusted friends – Jennifer Sky as feisty sidekick Amarice, Danielle Cormack as Amazon regent Ephiny, Bruce Campbell as Autolycus King of Thieves, Robert Trebor as dodgy entrepreneur Salmoneus, William Gregory Lee as the warrior-poet Virgil and Tim Omundson as the spiritual healer Eli.

=== Theme music ===
Composer Joseph LoDuca wrote the theme music and incidental music, and co-wrote the lyrics for the songs in "The Bitter Suite." The theme music was developed from the traditional Bulgarian folk song "Kaval sviri," sung by the Bulgarian State Television Female Vocal Choir. The original "Kaval sviri" can be heard where Xena races into battle in the Hercules episode "Unchained Heart."

The musical score of Xena: Warrior Princess was critically well received and garnered seven Emmy nominations for LoDuca, who won the Emmy award for Outstanding Music Composition for a Series (Dramatic Underscore) for the Season 5 episode Fallen Angel in 2000. Most of the series' music was made available on six soundtrack albums. Two of these albums contain the soundtracks from the musical episodes "The Bitter Suite" (Season 3) and "Lyre, Lyre, Hearts on Fire" (Season 5).

=== Cancellation ===
Low ratings in the US market led to the winding down of production in Auckland in October 2000, at which point filming was scheduled to end in April 2001. Between 150 to 200 crew and actors were facing the loss of their jobs, but expected to move on to other projects; and income for local businesses, including the catering and timber industries, was at risk of collapse. In New Zealand, both rights holders (over-the-air channel TV3 airing season 3 and subscription channel Sky 1 airing season 4 at the time of the decision) were keen on buying the last remaining seasons of the show.

== Characters ==
Main cast of Xena: Warrior Princess
Character	Actor	Seasons					
Character	Actor	1	2	3	4	5	6
Xena	Lucy Lawless	Main	Main	Main	Main	Main	Main
Gabrielle	Renee O'Connor	Main	Main	Main	Main	Main	Main
Joxer	Ted Raimi	Guest	Recurring	Recurring	Recurring	Recurring	Guest
Ares	Kevin Smith	Recurring	Recurring	Recurring	Guest	Recurring	Recurring
Callisto	Hudson Leick	Guest	Recurring	Recurring	Guest	Guest	
Julius Caesar	Karl Urban		Guest	Recurring	Recurring		Guest
Eve	Adrienne Wilkinson					Recurring	Recurring
Aphrodite	Alexandra Tydings		Guest	Recurring	Guest	Recurring	Recurring
Borias	Marton Csokas			Recurring	Recurring		Guest
Ephiny	Danielle Cormack	Recurring	Recurring	Recurring	Guest		Guest
Autolycus	Bruce Campbell	Guest	Recurring	Recurring	Recurring		
Eli	Timothy Omundson				Recurring	Recurring	
Alti	Claire Stansfield				Recurring	Recurring	Recurring
Amarice	Jennifer Sky				Recurring	Recurring	
Virgil	William Gregory Lee					Recurring	Recurring
Varia	Tsianina Joelson						Recurring
Athena	Paris Jefferson					Recurring	

=== Main ===
The series follows Xena and her traveling companion Gabrielle. Xena is on a quest to redeem herself for her dark past by using her formidable combat skills to help people. In Hercules, during her two first episodes, Xena was a villain and a powerful warlord, but in her third appearance she joins Hercules to defeat the warlord Darphus, who had taken her army. During her own series, Xena spends almost every episode on a different mission, always trying to do the right thing, fighting for what she refers to as the "greater good". Xena's trademark weapon is a chakram, and she also uses a sword. Xena also has to fight her own past; she has never forgiven herself for her crimes, and often has to resist the temptation to return to her evil ways, but she always resists with the help of Gabrielle.

Gabrielle is Xena's best friend and greatest ally. She is introduced in the first episode, first as a big fan of Xena and her history, but soon becomes a notable character in her own right. As the show progresses she undergoes significant changes in costume and style, evolving from a simple farm girl to a talented bard, and eventually to a formidable warrior. She is initiated into a tribe of Amazons, learns to fight with a staff, and is trained by Xena. In the first season, Xena and Gabrielle meet Joxer, a comic man who styles himself "Joxer the Magnificent", and later "Joxer the Mighty." Joxer's goal is to fight for justice, but unfortunately with no physical know-how of his own, he remains the show's main comic relief. Eventually he becomes a close friend of Xena and Gabrielle.

=== Others ===
In the first season, Xena and Gabrielle meet two of their greatest enemies: Callisto (Hudson Leick), a vengeful warrior woman, and Ares (Kevin Smith), the Greek God of War. Callisto is Xena's arch-enemy and a major antagonist over the course of the series. When Callisto was a child, her home village of Cirra was burned nearly to the ground by Xena, killing her family. She was left traumatized by the attack and eventually went insane, becoming obsessed with exacting revenge on Xena. She displays a bizarre brand of sadistic, gleeful, shrieking cruelty towards Xena and her associates. Hercules himself reappears alongside Iolaus - who becomes interested in Gabrielle - when Xena seeks to free Prometheus from Hera.

Ares – suave, charming, witty, yet ruthless and amoral – often represents, especially in the early seasons, the seductive power of war and the dark side. He repeatedly attempts to lure Xena away from her quest for redemption, and tries to win her over as his Warrior Queen. He offers her huge armies and historic victories, great wealth and great power, and in later seasons his love, offers which she consistently rejects despite sometimes being tempted. Much of his relationship with Xena remains ambiguous, including whether he is at least partly redeemed by his love for Xena, and to what extent Xena reciprocates his feelings. He says several times that he "has a thing" for Xena, and he pursues her sexually and romantically. This seems to prevent him killing her, even when pitted against her in deadly combat. Likewise, it is suggested that Xena has strong feelings for Ares, but throughout the series she is never seen to act on them.

Other major antagonists of the show include Caesar and Alti, a Roman official and shamaness respectively. Caesar's first appearance was in the second-season episode "Destiny." He is introduced as a young Roman patrician brimming with arrogance - so much so, that when he is captured by Xena and her pirates he is not afraid. When threatened by Xena he tells her "I know what I'm fated to do with my life." He pretends to let Xena seduce him, when in reality she is the one being seduced. This ultimately leads to her capture and crucifixion at his hands, and he orders his men to break her legs - an extremely painful memory that is often revisited during the series. Caesar's betrayal fills her with rage, and is the catalyst for her transition from pirate to warlord.

Alti is an evil shamaness from the Northern Amazon tribes of Siberia, who had been driven out of her tribe because of her hunger for power. She is one of the most influential people encountered by Xena in her dark days, and possesses a wealth of spiritual powers, including travelling to the spiritual realm. Alti is probably best known for her trademark stare, which brings up pain and suffering from the target's life and unleashes the torment once again (in the form of both pain and physical symptoms). When she stares at Xena, Xena often feels the pain of her legs being broken, her back being snapped, and a crippling barrage of attacks from her worst enemies. As Alti grows in power during the series, she can also conjure up pain and suffering from a person's future, and from their future lives. This power backfires early in Season 4, when she shows Xena a vision from her future, of her and Gabrielle being crucified on Mount Amarro. Xena realizes that Gabrielle must still be alive, and this gives her the strength to defeat Alti.

Over the course of the series, viewers were also introduced to family members of both Xena and Gabrielle, but most notably featured their children. Xena gave her first child, a son named Solan, to a group of centaurs after the death of his father, Borias, who was killed in combat against a warrior in Xena's employ. Solan never knew that Xena was his mother, despite knowing Xena for a long time. While aiding Xena and Boudica to defend Britannia against Caesar, Gabrielle comes into contact with an evil cult that tricks her into killing one of its priestesses, Meridian. Using her, the dark god Dahak impregnates Gabrielle just as Xena rescues her. Over the next few days the child grows inside Gabrielle, and she eventually (and quite dramatically) gives birth to a girl, naming her Hope. Even though she is the seed of an evil deity, Gabrielle tells Xena that she is also a part of her and that there must be some good in her as well. Being the daughter of Dahak, she quickly developed supernatural powers, and kills within hours of being born, proving to Xena that there was no chance of saving her. Hope aged amazingly fast, and, mere months after being drifted down a river by her mother, she appeared to be about 9 years old. Despite Gabrielle's hopes that she would "be good", Hope killed Xena's son Solan before being poisoned by Gabrielle herself.

During the episode "The Ides of March", at the end of season 4, Xena and Gabrielle were crucified by the Romans, as Caesar is betrayed and killed by Brutus. They are later revived by a mystic named Eli with the spiritual aid of Callisto, who by that time had become an angel; Callisto also engineers a plan to have Xena conceive a daughter after the resurrection, and this child is prophesied to bring about the Twilight of the Olympian gods; this girl was named Eve. To escape the gods' persecution, Xena and Gabrielle fake their deaths, but their plan goes awry when Ares buries them in an ice cave where they sleep for 25 years; during that time, Eve is adopted by the Roman nobleman Octavius and grows up to become Livia, the Champion of Rome, and a ruthless persecutor of Eli's followers. After her return, Xena is able to turn Livia to repentance, and Livia takes back the name Eve and becomes the Messenger of Eli. After Eve's cleansing by baptism, Xena is granted the power to kill gods as long as her daughter lives. In a final confrontation, the Twilight comes to pass when Xena kills most of the gods on Olympus to save her daughter, and is herself saved by Ares when he gives up his immortality to heal the badly injured and dying Eve and Gabrielle.

== Geography ==
The vast majority of locations in the series are fictional. However, a few locations in the plot are centered on real Ancient Greek towns, including:

=== Amphipolis ===
Xena – the main character of the show – was born in the city of Amphipolis in northern Greece. Xena and her best friend, Gabrielle, frequently visited there over the course of the series and it was referenced often. Xena described Amphipolis as "full of life", although several times it was full of death: for instance, the city became a breeding ground for demons after Xena and Gabrielle returned from their twenty-five-year sleep. Mephistopheles, the King of Hell, had captured the soul of Xena's mother Cyrene and imprisoned her in Hell.

In the backstory of the show, Xena had set out ten years prior to become a warrior to protect Amphipolis from attacks by a warlord called Cortese. This was the journey that turned her into a fierce fighter with an evil reputation. When she was inspired to fight for good, she returned to Amphipolis, seeking a reunion with her mother. Along the way, she met Gabrielle in Potidaea.

In a fictionalized conversation between Julius Caesar and Xena in the "Destiny" episode in Season 2, Xena tells him Stageira "is the ancient enemy of my homeland, Amphipolis."

=== Potidaea ===
Gabrielle was born in Potidaea in Chalkidiki, Greece, which features many times as a rural village, which should have been portrayed as a fishing village. Many pivotal episodes are based here, including the series premiere, "Sins of the Past", and "A Family Affair".

=== Athens ===
Joxer was brought up in the city of Athens, capital of Greece, and it is often mentioned in passing. Xena and Gabrielle rarely pass through it, but it was the main setting for the clip show "Athens City Academy of the Performing Bards", and was nearly visited in "One Against an Army" and "Blind Faith".

=== Cirra ===
Callisto is from Cirra in Phocis, central Greece. Xena's army torched the village when Callisto was a child, killing most of her family. Xena and Gabrielle only visit Cirra once, although it is mentioned often.

=== Countries ===
In addition to Greece, Xena and Gabrielle visit many countries during their travels, including Italy (usually referred to by its capital, Rome), China (called 'Chin'), Japan (known as 'Jappa', only seen in the finale, and mentioned in passing in "Who's Gurkhan"), Great Britain (known as 'Brittania'), India, Siberia, Egypt (called 'The Land of the Pharaohs'), Sahara, Morocco (in "Who's Gurkhan" and "Legacy"), and several Scandinavian countries (called 'Norseland').

To remain in keeping with the ancient world, and to avoid using modern names, the script often removed the last letter of a country's name, changing China to Chin, and Japan to Jappa.

== Hercules–Xena Universe franchise media ==
There have been numerous Xena spin-offs into various media, including films, books, comics and video games.

=== Movies ===
Hercules and Xena – The Animated Movie: The Battle for Mount Olympus, a direct-to-video animated movie, was released in January 1998. The film features the voices of actors from both Hercules: The Legendary Journeys and Xena: Warrior Princess – including Lucy Lawless, Kevin Sorbo, Michael Hurst and Renee O'Connor. The plot involves Hercules' mother being kidnapped by Zeus and the release of the Titans. Xena and Gabrielle have supporting roles in the movie.

Since the end of the series, rumors have circulated that a feature-length movie was in the works. In 2003, screenwriter Katherine Fugate was approached for the project, and was quoted saying that she expected the start of production to be three to five years away, which suggested a release sometime between 2006 and 2009. Actress Lucy Lawless was quoted in several interviews saying she would be interested in participating in a Xena film as well.

In April 2009, Robert Tapert stated there was no intention of a live-action Xena feature film. "It's something that just won't happen....In twenty years or ten years, in some amount of years, like MacGyver, like Charlie's Angels, it [could] happen like that [with other actresses]."

Following the continued online popularity of the show, a global campaign to directly bombard Universal Pictures with requests for a Xena movie was launched in April 2013. Over a few days, hundreds of thousands of messages were sent showing support for the production of a Xena film starring the original cast. After receiving acknowledgement from Universal Studios' offices in Australia, Finland, and Spain, campaign efforts were rewarded in May 2013 when Lucy Lawless stated on her Twitter account that she had been contacted by a "chap who wants to re-invigorate the #Xena brand", while warning fans that "there's a lot of red tape around #XWP so don't get your knickers in a twist. It may come back in a different form". Since then, Lucy Lawless has appeared on multiple televised interviews showing her support of a potential revival of the Xena franchise, stating that talks are currently underway to resolve legal issues impeding the progress of a potential Xena movie project.

=== Literature ===
Many books have been released as tie-ins, including The Official Guide to the Xenaverse by Robert Weisbrot. This includes a detailed episode guide for the first two seasons, a look behind the scenes, the story of the origin of the show, biographies of cast and crew, and trivia about the show. After the sixth and final season, Xena Warrior Princess: Complete Illustrated Companion was published.

In 1998, XENA: All I Need to Know I Learned From the Warrior Princess, was published, allegedly written by Gabrielle, Bard of Potidaea and "translated" by Josepha Sherman. In it, Gabrielle writes enthusiastically about many of the lessons that she learned. For example, in a chapter entitled "Anything can be a weapon- Anything!", she instructs the reader on fighting with unconventional weapons; in another, "Nobody Likes a Winer", she bemoans the perils of alcohol.

There have been a number of novelizations by authors such as Martin H. Greenberg, and fiction such as The Empty Throne, The Huntress and The Sphinx, The Thief of Hermes, and Prophecy of Darkness. The series has also figured in many doctoral theses, including a thesis by French/American scholar, Dr. Anne Sweet, Girl Power Interrogated in Xena Warrior Princess and Charmed, Social and Economic Issues at Play in the Politics of Gender.

=== Comics ===
There have been a number of comic adaptations. The earliest ones were released by Topps Comics and Dark Horse Comics (written by Ian Edginton and John Wagner). More recently the license has moved to Dynamite Entertainment.

=== Role-playing game ===
West End Games published the Hercules & Xena Roleplaying Game in 1998.

=== Collectible card game ===
Wizards of the Coast published the Xena: Warrior Princess collectible card game in May 1998.

=== Video games ===
- Simutronics Corporation created an MMORPG under license called Hercules & Xena: Alliance of Heroes, based on both Xena: Warrior Princess and Hercules: The Legendary Journeys. In subsequent years—after the two series left first run—Simutronics relinquished the license, removed trademarked material and rebranded the game as Alliance of Heroes. With a dwindling player base, the game was closed down on November 2, 2015.
- Electronic Arts published Xena: Warrior Princess video game for the PS1 in 1999. Played from a third-person perspective, the game play involves slashing, jumping, and kicking through a variety of primitive 3D environments. Xena can also find and use power-ups and her trademark chakram. Once thrown, the chakram becomes a first-person weapon to guide toward enemies.
- Saffire published Xena: Warrior Princess: The Talisman of Fate for the Nintendo 64 console in 1999.
- Xena: Warrior Princess for the Game Boy Color was developed and released by Titus Software in 2000.
- Xena: Warrior Princess: Death in Chains, a multi-path video game for the PC adapted from and expanding upon the television episode of the same name, although none of the original actors provide their voices.
- Xena: Warrior Princess: Girls Just Wanna Have Fun, another multi-path video game for the PC, again adapted from and expanding upon the television episode of the same name, again without the original voice actors.
- Xena: Warrior Princess for the PS2 only released in Europe.
- On May 16, 2024, Zen Studios released a digital pinball table inspired by the series as part of the Universal Pinball: TV Classics downloadable content for Pinball FX. The other 2 tables in the pack were based on other well-known nostalgic hit NBCUniversal TV shows, Knight Rider and Battlestar Galactica.

=== VHS releases ===
Universal released seasons 1–6 on VHS in 1999–2001.

=== DVD releases ===
Anchor Bay Entertainment released all 6 seasons of Xena: Warrior Princess on DVD in Region 1 between 2003 and 2005, with a wide range of extras. As of 2010, these releases have been discontinued.

On January 12, 2010, Universal Studios Home Entertainment announced plans to re-release Xena: Warrior Princess on DVD. They have subsequently re-released all six seasons. A complete series set was released on May 17, 2016.

In Region 2 & 4, Universal Pictures released the entire series on DVD. In addition, a complete series collection was released on DVD in Region 2 on October 8, 2007.

Region 4 DVD:

- Season 1: Part 1 and Season 1: Part 2 on 4 February 2002 (Slipbox with 3 Amaray Cases)
- Season 2: Part 1 and Season 2: Part 2 on 3 October 2002 (Slipbox with 3 Amaray Cases)
- Season 3 on 27 June 2003 (Slipbox with 25mm Amaray Case)
- Season 4, Season 5 and Season 6 on 27 July 2004 (Slipbox with 25mm Amaray Case)
- On 10 October 2005, each season were reissued into Parts 1 & 2 in standard DVD cases
- Seasons 1-6 (Limited Edition Collector's Bag on 14 November 2006.
- The Ultimate Collection on 11 October 2018

== Reception ==
=== Critical response ===
On Rotten Tomatoes, the first season has a rating of 89%, based on 9 reviews, with an average rating of 8/10. The site's critical consensus reads, "Lucy Lawless exudes steely charisma in Xena: Warrior Princess, a swashbuckling actioner that transcends its origin as a spinoff and becomes a fully realized saga in its own right." Ken Tucker of Entertainment Weekly, giving the season a B+: "Xena is Wonder Woman on steroids, and Lawless — with her dark bangs, moon face, light blue eyes, and small, grim smiles — plays the warrior princess with barely concealed delight."

=== Awards ===
Year	Association	Category	Nominated artist/work	Result
1997	ASCAP Film and Television Music Awards	Most Performed Underscore	Joseph LoDuca	Won
1997	Primetime Emmy Awards	Outstanding Music Composition for a Series	Joseph LoDuca ("Destiny")	Nominated
1997	Saturn Awards	Best Genre TV Actress	Lucy Lawless	Nominated
1998	ASCAP Film and Television Music Awards	Most Performed Underscore	Joseph LoDuca	Won
1998	New Zealand Film and TV Awards	Best Contribution to Design	Ngila Dickson (costume designer)	Won
1998	Primetime Emmy Awards	Outstanding Original Music and Lyrics	"The Love of Your Love" – Joseph LoDuca (composer/lyricist)	Nominated
1998	Primetime Emmy Awards	Outstanding Original Music and Lyrics	"Hearts Are Hurting" – Joseph LoDuca (composer), Dennis Spiegel (lyricist)	Nominated
1999	ASCAP Film and Television Music Awards	Most Performed Underscore	Joseph LoDuca	Won
1999	Primetime Emmy Awards	Outstanding Music Composition for a Series	Joseph LoDuca ("Devi")	Nominated
2000	ASCAP Film and Television Music Awards	Most Performed Underscore	Joseph LoDuca	Won
2000	Primetime Emmy Awards	Outstanding Music Composition for a Series	Joseph LoDuca ("Fallen Angel")	Won
2001	ASCAP Film and Television Music Awards	Most Performed Underscore	Joseph LoDuca	Won
2001	Primetime Emmy Awards	Outstanding Music Composition for a Series	Joseph LoDuca ("The Rheingold")	Nominated
2002	Primetime Emmy Awards	Outstanding Music Composition for a Series	Joseph LoDuca ("A Friend in Need, Part II")	Nominated

=== U.S. ratings ===
Season		Highest U.S. ratings	Network	Rank
1	1995–1996	6.1 million	Syndication	#12
2	1996–1997	7.8 million	Syndication	#7
3	1997–1998	6.6 million	Syndication	#9
4	1998–1999	4.9 million	Syndication	#13
5	1999–2000	4.1 million	Syndication	#2
6	2000–2001	3.9 million	Syndication	#2

=== Influence on the lesbian community ===
Xena kissing Gabrielle in the Season 2 episode "The Quest"

Xena has enjoyed a particular cult status in the lesbian community. Some of the lesbian fan base see Xena and Gabrielle as a couple and have embraced them as role models and lesbian icons. Xena's popularity was successfully utilized by Subaru when trying to establish a healthy base of lesbian customers: one ad had a car with the license plate "XENA LVR" (Xena lover).

A subject of much interest and debate among viewers is the question of whether Xena and Gabrielle are lovers. The issue is left deliberately ambiguous by the writers. Jokes, innuendo, and other subtle evidence of a romantic relationship between Xena and Gabrielle is referred to as "lesbian subtext" or simply "subtext" by fans. The issue of the true nature of the Xena-Gabrielle relationship caused intense "shipping" debates in Xena fandom, which turned especially impassioned due to spillover from real-life debates about same-sex sexuality and gay rights.

Many fans felt that the sexual nature of Xena and Gabrielle's relationship was cemented by an interview given by Lucy Lawless to Lesbian News magazine in 2003. Lawless stated that after the series finale, where Gabrielle revives Xena with a mouth-to-mouth water transfer filmed to look like a full kiss, she had come to believe that Xena and Gabrielle's relationship was "definitely gay". "There was always a, 'Well, she might be or she might not be' but when there was that drip of water passing between their lips in the very final scene, that cemented it for me. Now it wasn't just that Xena was bisexual and kinda liked her gal pal and they kind of fooled around sometimes, it was 'Nope, they're married, man'."

The Xena fandom also popularized the term altfic (from "alternative fiction") to refer to same-sex romantic fan fiction.

=== Costume donation ===
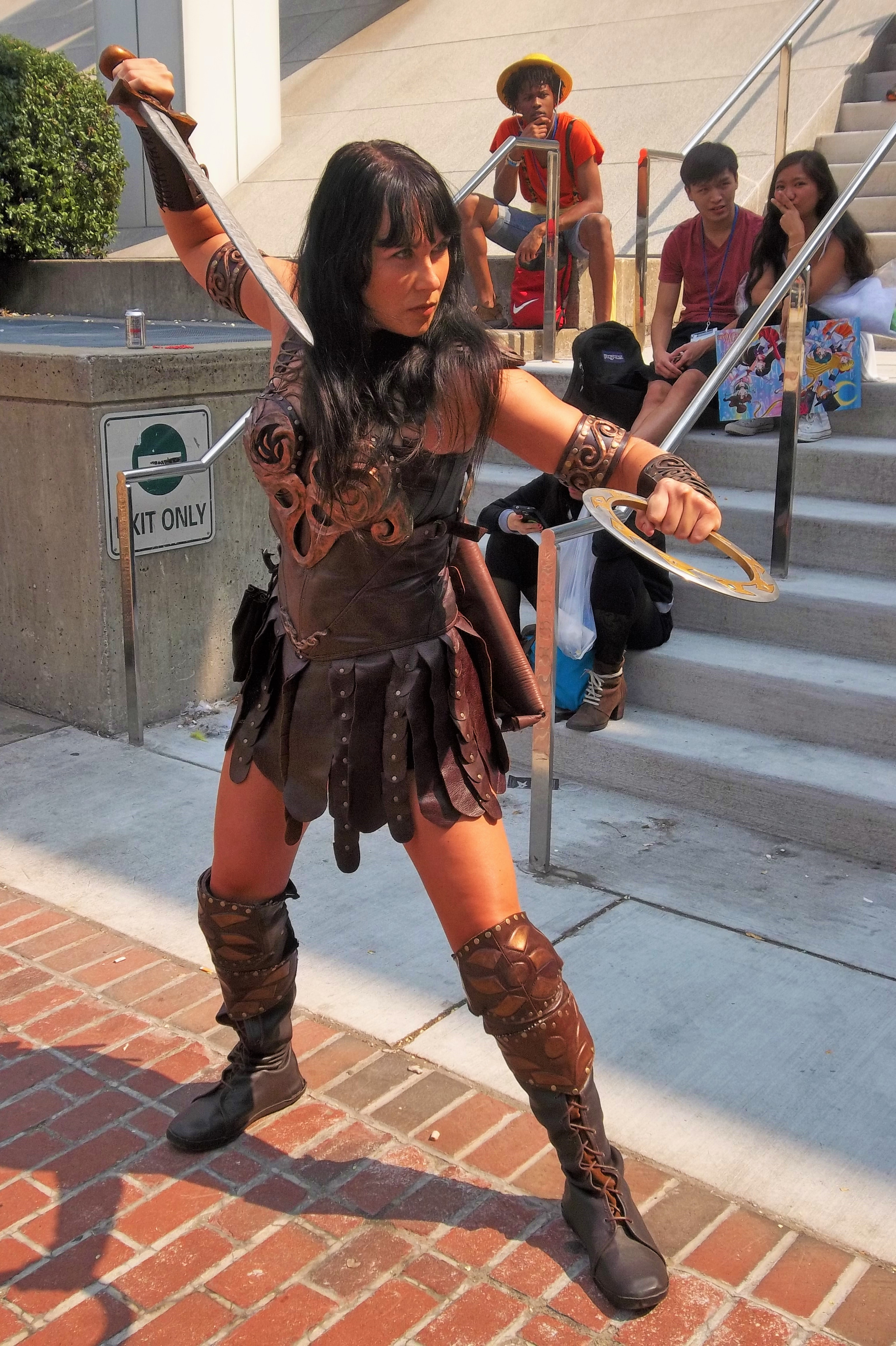
Xena cosplayer in an outfit similar to the one in the series

In 2006, Lucy Lawless donated her personal Xena costume to the National Museum of American History. In an interview the same year with Smithsonian magazine, she was asked the question "Was the Warrior Princess outfit comfortable?" and responded:

Not at first, because they would put boning in the corset. It would cover up those little floating ribs that are so important for breathing, so I'd feel like I was having panic attacks. But it just became a second skin after a while. It was very functional, once I got over the modesty factor. I admit to being a little bit embarrassed the first couple weeks because I'd never worn anything so short.

=== Uber and Uberfic ===
Uberfic is a variety of fan fiction in which the characters live in an alternate universe. The characters and events are true to the original canon, but usually in a different time period, often as the ancestors, descendants, or reincarnations of canon characters. The term originated in Xena fandom. Uber was employed several times in the series, beginning with the second-season episode "The Xena Scrolls", in which the descendants of Xena, Gabrielle and Joxer meet up at an archeological dig in 1940 and unwittingly release Ares from his tomb.

== Cancelled reboot ==
On July 20, 2015, it was reported that NBC was developing a Xena reboot series, with Raimi and Tapert returning as executive producers, with the show's debut sometime in 2016. Insiders also requested that Lawless return to the series as Xena, as well as take up a role in the show's production. A day later, Lawless tweeted that the reboot was a rumor. On August 13, 2015, NBC Entertainment chairman Bob Greenblatt confirmed the reboot was in development. Entertainment Weekly announced that Javier Grillo-Marxuach would serve as writer and producer for the reboot.

In a post on Tumblr, Grillo-Marxuach stated that they would be "fully exploring a relationship that could only be shown subtextually in first-run syndication in the 1990s," which several websites such as The Guardian and Newsweek took to mean "Xena will be an out and proud lesbian." These articles resulted in frustration from fans regarding the erasure of Xena's apparent bisexuality; Grillo-Marxuach said "it feels like - from a few sentences - everyone has already made up their mind about what it is I am doing. I would prefer people be surprised by the story." In April 2017, Grillo-Marxuach announced that he had left the project because of "insurmountable creative differences."

On August 21, 2017, NBC announced that it had cancelled its plans for the reboot. NBC Entertainment president Jennifer Salke said, "I'd never say never on that one because it's such a beloved title but the current incarnation of it is dead."
