= Renee O'Connor =

American actress, producer, and director

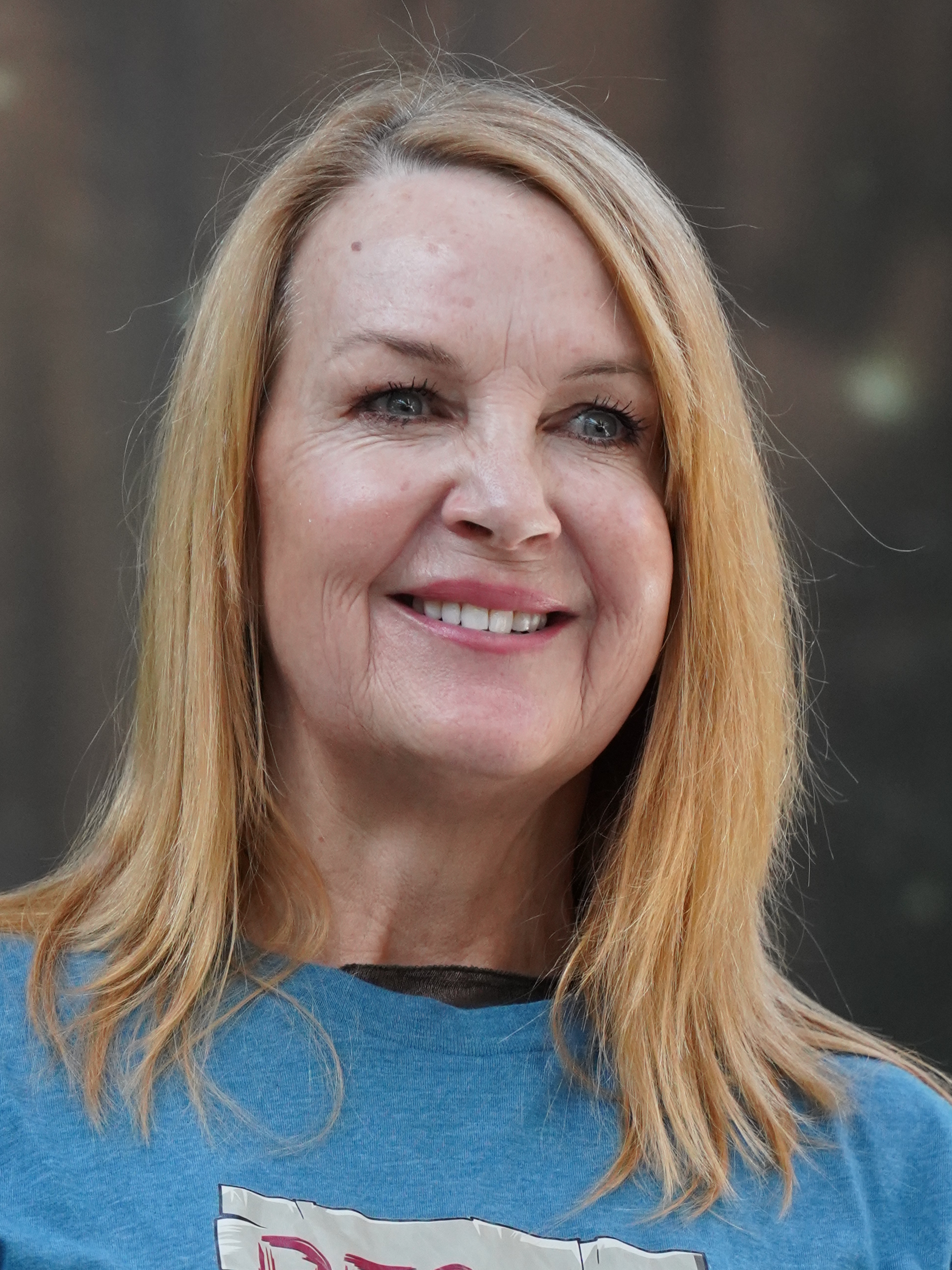
- O'Connor in 2025
- Born: Evelyn Renee O'Connor; February 15, 1971 (age 55); Houston, Texas, U.S.
- Occupation: Actress
- Years active: 1989–present
- Spouse(s): Steve Muir (m. 2000; div. 2004) Jed Sura (m. 2017)
- Children: 2

Evelyn Renee O'Connor (born February 15, 1971) is an American actress, producer, and director, known for the role of Gabrielle on the television series Xena: Warrior Princess.

== Early life ==
Renee O'Connor was born in Houston, Texas, and raised in nearby suburban Katy, Texas by her mother Sandra. At age 12, Renee began acting at the Alley Theatre in Houston, Texas. She attended Kinder High School for the Performing and Visual Arts in Houston, and made her professional debut as a dancing Porky Pig at Houston's Six Flags AstroWorld. After graduating high school, she relocated to Los Angeles, California, to pursue an acting career. In 1991, O'Connor also appeared as a contestant on an episode of the game show The Price is Right.

== Career ==
O'Connor made her screen debut at 17, starring in the "Teen Angel" segment of the Disney Channel's The Mickey Mouse Club, and the subsequent Teen Angel TV series. She went on to the Disney film The Adventures of Huck Finn and TV-movies including Follow the River, Danielle Steele's Changes, and Hercules and the Lost Kingdom, starring Kevin Sorbo. There, in the role of Deianeira, O'Connor came to the attention of Hercules executive producers Rob Tapert and Sam Raimi, who cast her as Gabrielle in the spinoff TV series Xena: Warrior Princess.

In 2001, O'Connor began her own film production company, Roc Productions. The following year, she played Lady Macbeth in the Shakespeare by the Sea production of Macbeth. O'Connor reprised the role in a House of Bards Theatre Company production in San Pedro, California, from October 11 to November 3, 2019. She played Nurse in the Southern Shakespeare Company's May 10–13, 2018, production of Romeo and Juliet alongside her 16-year-old son, Miles Muir.

== Personal life ==
In 1998, O'Connor began dating restaurateur Steve Muir. The couple married in 2000 and O'Connor had a son in 2001. O'Connor and Muir divorced in 2004.

O'Connor began a relationship with Jed Sura in 2004 and had a daughter in 2006. O'Connor and Sura were married in 2017.

== Filmography ==
=== Film ===
Year	Title	Role	Notes
1989	Match Point	Robin	Television movie
1989	Night Game	Lorraine Beasley	
1990	Black Snow	Jennifer Winslow	
1990	False Identity	Angela Errickson	
1991	Changes	Jessica Adams	Television film
1991	Stone Cold	Tinselteeth Hostage	
1993	Sworn to Vengeance	Unknown	Television film
1993	The Adventures of Huck Finn	Julia Wilks	
1993	The Flood: Who Will Save Our Children?	Leslie	Television film
1994	Hercules and the Lost Kingdom	Deianeira	Television film
1995	Follow the River	Bettie Draper	Television film
1995	The Rockford Files: A Blessing in Disguise	Laura Sue Dean	Television film
1995	Darkman II: The Return of Durant	Laurie Brinkman	
1997	Hercules & Xena: Wizards of the Screen	Gabrielle	Short film
1998	Hercules and Xena – The Animated Movie: The Battle for Mount Olympus	Gabrielle	
2001	Accidents Don't Happen	Ashton	
2004	One Weekend a Month	Meg McDermott	Short film
2005	Alien Apocalypse	Lieutenant Kelly Lanaman	Television film
2007	Ghost Town: The Movie	Little Jack	
2007	Boogeyman 2	Dr. Jessica Ryan	
2008	Diamonds and Guns	Ashley	Also executive producer and co-director
2008	Monster Ark	Dr. Ava Greenway	Television film
2009	Bitch Slap	Sister Batril	
2010	Words Unspoken	Sue	Short film; also director, producer, and writer
2010	2010: Moby Dick	Dr. Michelle Herman	
2011	Deadrise	Paula	
2011	Infinity	Elizabeth	Short film, Producer
2011	Are You Kidding Me?		Director
2013	Stranded From An Island		Short; executive producer and assistant editor
2015	Beyond the Farthest Star	Maurene Wells	
2015	Last Chance	Carrie	Television film; also executive producer
2015	Broken Things		Director
2016	The Usual	Mrs. Ford	Short film; also executive producer
2017	Watch the Sky	Shannon	Producer
2017	A Question of Faith	Mary Danielson	

=== Television ===
Year	Title	Role	Notes
1989	Teen Angel	Nancy Nichols	
1990	Tales from the Crypt	Waitress	Episode: "The Switch" (Deleted scene)
1991	ABC Afterschool Specials	Linda	Episode: "The Less Than Perfect Daughter"
1992	FBI: The Untold Stories	Officer Renee Lanot / Tina Marie Risico	3 episodes
1993	NYPD Blue	Rebecca Sloane	Episode: "Oscar, Meyer, Weiner"
1997–1999	Hercules: The Legendary Journeys	Gabrielle	4 episodes
1995–2001	Xena: Warrior Princess	Gabrielle	134 episodes
2002	Mataku	American Buyer	Episode: "The Heirloom"
2008	Criminal Minds	Pam Baleman	Episode: "A Higher Power"
2010	Ark	Connie Miller	9 episodes
2021	My Life Is Murder	Clarissa Klein	Episode: "Pleasure & Pain"
2026	Hacks	Herself	Episode: "Number One Fan"

== Theater ==
Year	Title	Role	Notes
2002	Macbeth	Lady Macbeth	Shakespeare by the Sea
2017	Dinner With Friends	Beth	Little Fish Theatre
2017	Annie	Lily St.Regis (as Renee Sura)	Warner Grand Theatre
2018	Romeo and Juliet	The Nurse	Southern Shakespeare Company
2018	On Clover Road	Kate Hunter	Little Fish Theatre
2018	Mary Poppins	Ms. Brill (as Renee Sura)	Redondo Beach Performing Arts Center
2019	The Wizard of Oz	The Wicked Witch of the West (as Renee Sura)	Redondo Beach Performing Arts Center
2019	Uncle Vanya	Yelena Andreyevna	Little Fish Theatre
