= Melanie Poole =

Australian director

== Biography ==
Melanie (Mel) Poole is an Australian director, producer and writer. She is also the co-founder of film production company 18 Degrees Films (18 Degrees Entertainment) based in Queensland.

== Career ==
Poole began her career working as a journalist and producer for Australia's national breakfast television program Today Show on Channel Nine. During this time, she directed a number of commercials. She has also worked as a journalist for Australia ABC Radio and Channel Ten. Under the name Melanie Kent, she has been a travel writer for various publications including Australia's largest circulating travel newspaper section News Ltd ESCAPE, one of her bigger articles being her recap of her trek to the Everest Base Camp.

In 2019, Mel wrote and directed ¨Sock and Buskin¨ which won the Audience Award at the Academy Award-qualifying St Kilda Film Festival.

Later in 2020, Mel directed ¨Dry¨, which won Best QLD Film and People´s Choice at the Australian Independent Film Festival.

In 2023, Mel was a panellist at the first SXSW to be held in Sydney.

In 2012, Poole was a co-producer, with Dan Macarthur on a film called The Suicide Theory, directed by Dru Brown and starring Steve Mouzakis and Leon Cain. In the film, a suicidal man wants to end his life after losing his wife to an accident. In order to follow through with his death wish he hires a hitman to kill him. Unfortunately it does not go as planned and he manages to survive every attempt. The two characters form an unlikely bond during the circumstances.

In 2013, Poole teamed up with Macarthur again and they co-wrote and produced a comedic gangster film called Nice Package. The film stars Dwayne Cameron, Leon Cain (returning from previous involvement), Ashley Lyons and new actress Isabella Tannock. The story follows an amateur thief who wants to escalate his thefts, as he is hiding the sexy, femme fatale hostage at his gay best friend's house after running into her when he steals a mysterious package. The trio then has to deal with the thugs hired to get the package back to the owner. Poole also has a small role in the film. From their early screenings to local markets, the response was positive.

As of 2013, Poole was working on a television show called Planet of Love, working alongside Canon to document how love and marriages are viewed in different countries and cultures around the world, and was also collaborating again with Macarthur on a Bollywood film.

== Filmography ==
Film	Role	Charlie (2024)	Writer / Director
Dry (2020)	Director		
Sock and Buskin (2019)	Writer / Director		
Nice Package (2016)	Producer, writer, actress		
The Suicide Theory (2014)	Producer		

Television	Role
Today Show (2000-2003)	Producer (10 episodes, 2002-2003)
