= Bruce Hopkins (actor) =

New Zealand actor (born 1955)

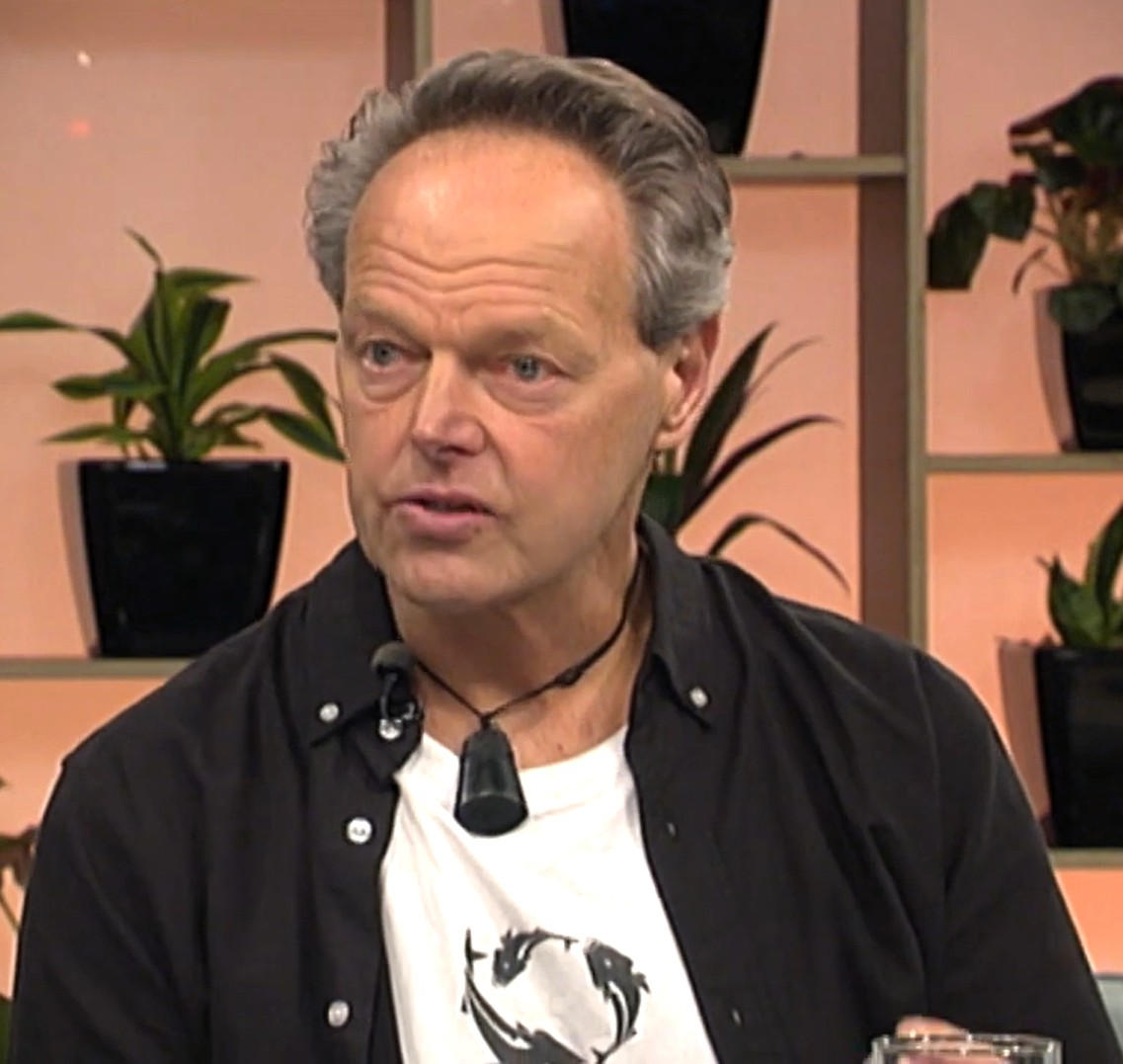
- Hopkins in 2018
- Born: Raymond Bruce Hopkins; 25 November 1955 (age 70); Invercargill, New Zealand
- Occupation: Actor
- Years active: 1987–present

Raymond Bruce Hopkins (born 25 November 1955) is a New Zealand actor, most famous for his portrayal of Gamling in The Lord of the Rings film trilogy by Peter Jackson and for playing the voice of evil alien Choobo on Power Rangers Ninja Storm. He also founded ActionActors, an actor-specific temporary employment agency, with Bruce Hurst.

Hopkins was born in Invercargill, the son of Colleen Marguerite and Bill Hopkins, a crayfisherman. He was a crayfisherman and a PE teacher before dedicating himself to the performing arts. He has worked as a professional dancer, theater company actor, television and film actor, voice actor, and radio host.

== Filmography ==
=== Film ===
Year	Title	Role	Notes
1990	Linda's Body	Colin	Short
1993	Desperate Remedies	Chorus #8	
1996	The Beach	David	Short
1996	Warm Gun	Bruce	
1997	The Bar		Short
1998	Flying	Chris	Short
1999	I'll Make You Happy	Jock	
2000	Savage Honeymoon	Rhys	
2000	Jubilee	Larry	
2000	Her Iliad	Drug Dealer 1	
2002	This Is Not a Love Story	TV Writer	
2002	The Lord of the Rings: The Two Towers	Gamling	
2003	The Lord of the Rings: The Return of the King	Gamling	
2004	1nite	Bruce	
2004	Point Annihilation	Claw	Short
2005	Rest Stop	Carl	Short
2007	You Move You Die	Officer Smuggler	Video
2008	Dean Spanley	Shepherd	
2009	Under the Mountain	Richard Matheson	
2012	Outback Revenge	Det. Raynor	AKA, Sleeper
2012	Rotting Hill	Farmer	Short
2012	Strongman: The Tragedy	Dick Thomas	Documentary
2014	3 Mile Limit	McGrath	
2014	Housebound	Officer Carson	
2015	Broke	Man	Short
2016	Each to Their Own	Pastor Chris	Short
2017	Into the Rainbow	Major	
2018	Sail Away		Short
20??	Ara	David Strand	Pre-production

=== Television ===
Year	Title	Role	Notes
1990, 1992	The New Adventures of Black Beauty	Farmer	Episodes: "Breaking In", "Hope", "The Convicts"
1995	High Tide	Barney Crenshaw	Episode: "The Runaways"
1995–1997, 1999	Hercules: The Legendary Journeys	Various	Guest (seasons 2, 4–5)
1995–1996, 1999–2000	Xena: Warrior Princess	Various	Guest (seasons 1–2, 4–5)
1998	Young Hercules	Theseus	Episode: "Amazon Grace"
1999	Greenstone	Brig Officer	TV film
1999	This Is It	Various	TV film
1999	Lawless	Andy Deakin	TV film
2000	Cleopatra 2525	Jake Lawson	Episode: "Last Stand"
2000	Jack of All Trades	Captain Standish	Episode: "Shark Bait"
2000	Lawless: Dead Evidence	Andy Deakin	TV film
2001	Lawless: Beyond Justice	Andy Deakin	TV film
2001	Mercy Peak	Colin Mitford	Episode: "Lazy Sunday Afternoon"
2002	Being Eve	Mr. Crabshaw	Episode: "Being Individual"
2002	The Vector File	Doug	TV film
2002	Blood Crime	Hostage Gunman	TV film
2002	Shortland Street	Marcus Bowman	Regular role
2002	Murder in Greenwich	Lancaster	TV film
2003	Power Rangers Ninja Storm	Choobo (voice)	Main role
2004	Ike: Countdown to D-Day	U.S. Colonel at Savoy	TV film
2004	Power Rangers Dino Thunder	Ruby Dragon (voice)	Episode: "House of Cards"
2005	Power Rangers S.P.D.	Ringbah / Praxis (voice)	Episodes: "Confronted", "Walls"
2006	Power Rangers Mystic Force	Clawbster (voice)	Episode: "Rock Solid"
2008	Power Rangers Jungle Fury	Gakko (voice)	Episodes: "A Taste of Poison", "Can't Win Them All", "Pizza Slice of Life"
2009	The Jaquie Brown Diaries	Mr. Cooper	Episode: "Brown's Bush: Part 2"
2015	The Monster of Mangatiti	Sergeant	TV documentary
2015	K Rd Stories	Homeless Guy	Episode: "Broke"
2016	Hillary	Auckland Grammar School Teacher	Episode: "Standing Tall"
2015, 2017	Find Me a Maori Bride	Maurice Partridge	Episodes: "1.8", "God's Game", "Respect", "Weddings"
2015	Ork Land		TV film, completed
