= Outback Revenge =

Outback Revenge (aka: Sleeper)
- DVD cover art
- Directed by: Dru Brown
- Written by: Dru Brown
- Story by: Dru Brown; Michael Skelton
- Produced by: Dru Brown; Judd Tilyard
- Starring: Scott Levy; Bruce Hopkins; Ty Hungerford; Kym Jackson
- Cinematography: Dan Macarthur
- Edited by: Tani Budini
- Music by: Phil Slade
- Production company: Seven8 Media
- Distributed by: Celebrity Home Entertainment
- Release date: 26 June 2012 (DVD)
- Running time: 86 minutes
- Country: Australia
- Language: English
- Budget: A$800,000 (est)

Outback Revenge (original limited released as Sleeper) is a 2012 Australian action horror film that was written and directed by Dru Brown and produced by Judd Tilyard. It features Bruce Hopkins and Scott "Raven" Levy.

== Plot ==
Brutal killer Adam Resnik (Scott Levy) escapes during a prison transfer and begins a bloody killing spree on his way home to Moonlight Bay, and the target of his desire – the young and vulnerable Kelly (Kym Jackson). Detectives Raynor (Bruce Hopkins) and Molloy (Ty Hungerford) track Resnik as he closes in on Kelly and her friends, racing to catch him before the sun goes down.

== Cast ==
- Scott Levy as Adam Resnik
- Kym Jackson as Kelly
- Bruce Hopkins as Det. Raynor
- Ty Hungerford as Det. Molloy
- Ray Sinclair as Det. Dwayne Miller
- Mick Roughan as Jack Chase
- Greg Bownds as Chase's Friend
- Nathan Corbett as Carnage
- Nicole Payten as Heather
- Lauren Orrell as Sara
- Adam Fawns as Josh
- Robert Reitano as Toby
- Cory Robinson as Baker
- Chris Hillier as Wace
- Christian McCarty as Ben
- Darko Tuscan as Det. Johnson
- Cameron Ambridge as Harry
- Nicholas G. Cooper as Officer Laffranchi
- Matt Gaffney as Mitchell
- Paul Geoghegan as Fowler
- Russell Ingram as Thomas
- Bridgette Paroissien as Swank
- Deborah Robson as Tammy
- Mick Roughan as Jack Chase
- Nicholas Schodel as Richard
- Ben Siemer as Randal

== Release ==
The film had an original limited release under the title Sleeper, and a later wider release under the title Outback Revenge with an accompanying horror short titled Mr. Bear.

== Reception ==
HorrorNews.net gave Sleeper a favorable review, writing that "Even though Sleeper sounds like films most of us have seen hundreds of times it still finds a way to knock its viewer on their head. The film simply flows and there isn’t really any slow moments, Resnick gets free and proceeds to tear through the town."

28 Days Later Analysis wrote "the story is a violent one, but one of better film elements within Sleeper are the many diverse settings", and also noted the "ending is a little vague, but the many action scenes make up for some of the deficiencies." They scored the film 7 out of 10, concluding "the story is not fleshed enough, a multi-dimensional villain, predictable".

Of its release in Germany, Amboss-Mag reviewed Outback Revenge and noted Scott Levy's showing himself as a superb casting choice for the role of Resnick. While most of the other cast were not entirely convincing, that point was less important because all they had to do was appear and "bite the dust", and though it barely prevented itself from looking low-budget, it was an entertaining action film.
