= Cherish =

Cherish may refer to:

== Music ==
- Cherish (group), an American R&B, soul, and hip hop quartet

=== Albums ===
- Cherish (David Cassidy album), 1972
- Cherish (Seiko Matsuda album), 2011

=== Songs ===
- "Cherish" (The Association song), 1966
- "Cherish" (Kool & the Gang song), 1985
- "Cherish" (Madonna song), 1989
- "Cherish (My Love)", by Illit, 2024
- "Cherish", by Ai Otsuka from Love Cook, 2005
- "Cherish", by Beni Arashiro from Girl 2 Lady, 2006
- "Cherish", by Brian McKnight from Back at One, 1999
- "Cherish", by Gretta Ray from Begin to Look Around, 2021
- "Cherish", by Ive from I've Ive, 2023
- "Cherish", by Nana Mizuki from Alive & Kicking, 2004
- "Cherish", by NEWS from Touch, 2005

== People ==
- Cherish Alexander Bailey, American singer, songwriter and musician
- Cherish Violet Blood, Canadian Kainai actress and storyteller
- Cherish Finden (born 1967), Singaporean-born pastry chef
- Cherish Mathson, Indian Army officer
- Cherish Parrish (born 1989), Native American basket weaver and artist
- Cherish Perrywinkle (2004–2013), American murder victim

== Other uses ==
- Cherish (film), a 2002 American film by Finn Taylor
- Rosa 'Cherish', a floribunda rose cultivar
- Valerie Cherish, a character in The Comeback
- Cherish, a character in Zatch Bell!

== See also ==
- Cherished, a 1977 album by Cher
- Cherished (film), a 2005 film by Robin Shepperd
