= Dean O'Gorman =

New Zealand actor

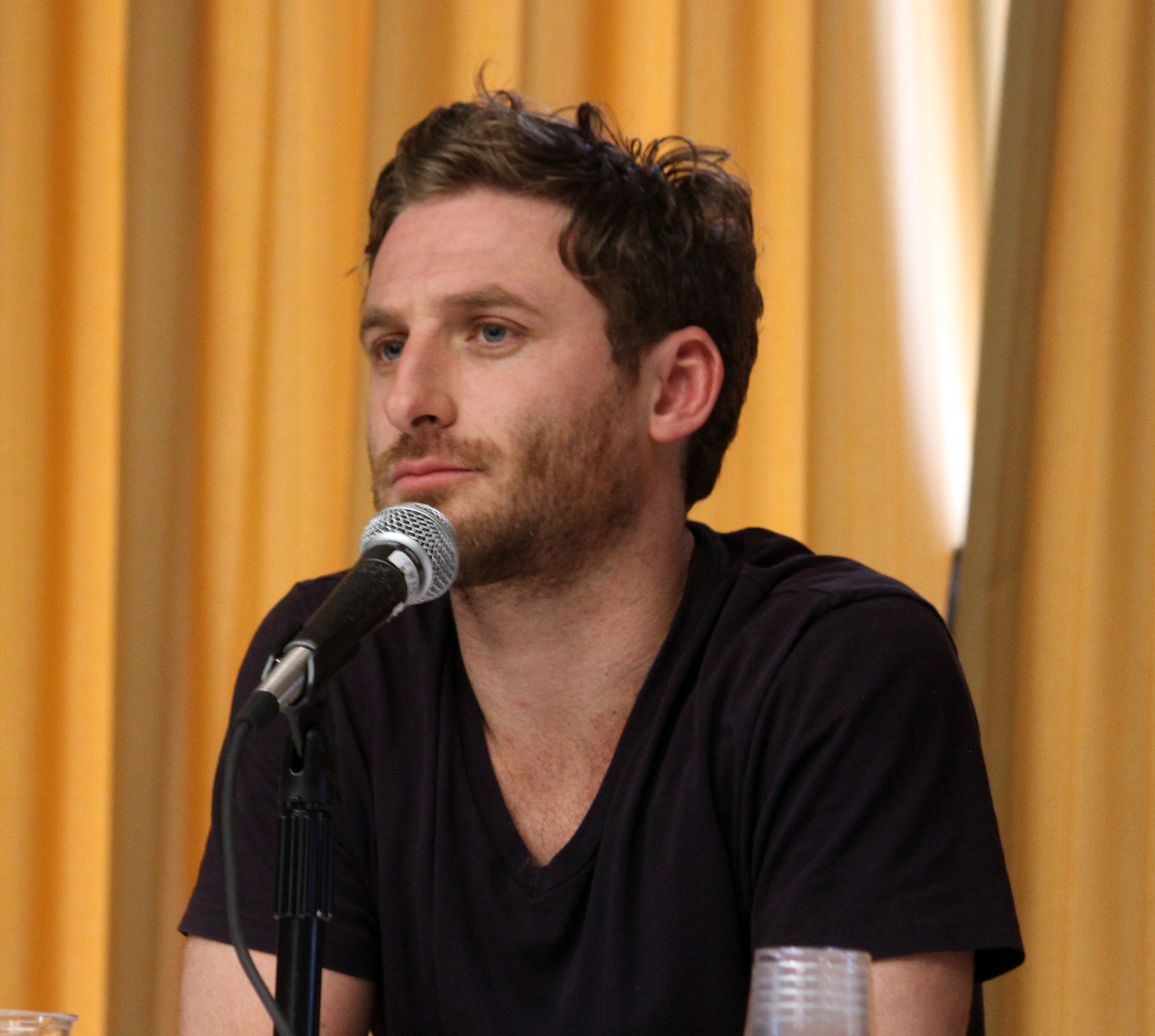
- O'Gorman at Boston Comic-Con in 2013
- Born: Dean Lance O'Gorman; 1 December 1976 (age 49); Auckland, New Zealand
- Occupations: Actor, photographer, artist
- Years active: 1990–present
- Children: 1
- Website: deanogorman.com

Dean Lance O'Gorman (born 1 December 1976) is a New Zealand actor, artist, and photographer. He played the dwarf Fíli in the Hobbit trilogy and the Norse god Bragi/Anders Johnson in the fantasy series The Almighty Johnsons. He also portrayed Kirk Douglas in Trumbo (2015).

== Early life ==
O'Gorman was born in Auckland to parents Lance, a landscape painter, and Vicky O'Gorman. His younger brother, Brett, is also an actor as well as a comedian. He has Irish and English ancestry; his maternal grandfather was a British paratrooper in the Second World War.

O'Gorman earned a black belt in karate by the age of ten, and attended Rangitoto College in Auckland. He initially planned to study graphic design.

== Career ==
=== Film ===
At 12 years old O'Gorman was discovered by a casting agent during a school speech competition. After acting in a number of television roles and the Australian film The Rogue Stallion, he got a starring role in 1995 teen romance Bonjour Timothy, a performance which earned him a nomination for Best Actor at the Giffoni Film Festival in Italy.

Subsequent roles included co-starring as Mark in the ensemble drama When Love Comes and playing opposite Melanie Lynskey in the road movie Snakeskin, the latter of which received five awards at the 2001 New Zealand Film and Television Awards.

In April 2011 O'Gorman was cast as the Dwarf Fili in Peter Jackson's three-part film adaptation of The Hobbit. He later made a cameo appearance in an advertisement for Air New Zealand.

In Jay Roach's 2015 film Trumbo O'Gorman plays the part of Kirk Douglas, including a re-creation of filming the movie Spartacus. He plays a demoralized writer in the 2017 film Pork Pie, winning praise at Cannes.

=== Television ===
O'Gorman began acting in television in the early 1990s. His career took off in the middle of the decade, when he won the role of Harry Martin in popular New Zealand soap opera Shortland Street and appeared in locally-shot shows Hercules: The Legendary Journeys and Xena: Warrior Princess multiple times. O'Gorman also held a regular role as Iolaus in the short-lived Young Hercules opposite Ryan Gosling, and in Australian hit McLeod's Daughters, as Luke Morgan, a love interest of Jodi Fountain McLeod.

He has made multiple guest appearances on several television shows including The Cult, Go Girls and Legend of the Seeker. From 2011 to 2013, O'Gorman played the role of Anders Johnson in New Zealand fantasy series The Almighty Johnsons. He played mountaineer George Lowe in 2016 mini-series Hillary.

=== Art and photography ===
In addition to acting, O'Gorman is also a photographer and artist. In an interview with Tom Cardy, he confessed to difficult times finding work during his first year in Los Angeles. He was almost broke, but was soon discovered by his friend's agent and thus began to receive more work, dividing his time among painting, photography and acting.

In June 2012, he held his first exhibition at the Page Blackie Gallery in Wellington, New Zealand. The theme of the exhibition focused on the Vietnam War. To obtain accuracy in his work, O'Gorman sought the advice of a New Zealand Vietnam veteran. Preferring to dress and set up shoots himself, the models for this gallery included other cast members from The Hobbit: An Unexpected Journey and The Almighty Johnsons. O'Gorman's photographs were also displayed at the 2015 Berlin B3 Biennial.

== Personal life ==
O'Gorman married his long-time girlfriend Sarah Wilson in January 2016.

Their daughter was born in May 2019.

== Filmography ==
=== Film ===
Year	Title	Role	Notes
1995	Bonjour Timothy	Timothy Taylor	
1996	Siren	Siren	Short film
1998	Young Hercules	Young Iolaus	Video
1998	When Love Comes Along	Mark	
2001	Snakeskin	Johnny	
2002	Toy Love	Ben	
2004	Piggy	Confucius	Short film
2008	The Legend of Bloody Mary	Rev. Whittaker	
2009	Sabotage	Bobby	
2010	Kawa	Chris	
2012	The Hobbit: An Unexpected Journey	Fíli	
2013	The Hobbit: The Desolation of Smaug	Fíli	
2014	The Hobbit: The Battle of the Five Armies	Fíli	
2015	Trumbo	Kirk Douglas	
2017	Pork Pie	Jon	
2023	The Convert	Kedgley	
2025	Forgive Us All	Supporting cast	

=== Television ===
Year	Title	Role	Notes
1990	The Rogue Stallion	Tony Garrett	TV film
1990	Raider of the South Seas	Bobby Morrison	TV series, main character
1995	Hercules: The Legendary Journeys	Iloran	Episode: "The Gauntlet"
1995–96	Shortland Street	Nurse Harry Martin	TV series, major reoccurring character
1996	Return to Treasure Island	Jim Hawkins	TV film
1996	Xena: Warrior Princess	Homer / Orion	Episode: "Athens City Academy of the Performing Bards"
1997	Doom Runners	Deek	TV film
1997	Hercules: The Legendary Journeys	Young Iolaus / Ruun	Episodes: "Regrets... I've Had a Few", "Prodigal Sister"
1998	Hercules: The Legendary Journeys	Young Iolaus	Episodes: "Medea Culpa", "Twilight"
1998	The Legend of William Tell	Darek	Episode: "The Tomb of the Unknown Warrior"
1998	The Chosen	Andrew Scott	TV film
1998–99	Young Hercules	Iolaus	Main role (45 episodes)
1999	Big Sky	Dean	Episode: "A Family Affair"
1999	Duggan	Fergus MacLllwaine	Episode: "Going Overboard"
1999	Fearless	Cliff	TV film
2000	Xena: Warrior Princess	Wiglaf	Episode: "Return of the Valkyrie"
2001	Lawless: Beyond Justice	Nat	TV film
2001	All Saints	Evan Coen	Episode: "The Other Side of Perfection"
2003	Farscape	Zukash	Episodes: "We're So Screwed: Parts 2 & 3"
2003	MDA	Peter Jarman	Episodes: "Judgement Day", "St. Crispin's Day"
2004	Serial Killers	Dr. Gilligan / Andrew	Regular role (7 episodes)
2004–05	McLeod's Daughters	Luke Morgan	Recurring role (25 episodes)
2007	Moonlight	Daniel	Episode "No Such Thing as Vampires"
2007–08	Animalia	Tyrannicus / Harry (voice)	Recurring role (4 episodes)
2009	Legend of the Seeker	Carver Dunn	Episode: "Deception"
2009	Go Girls	Marco	Episodes: "Signs and Obstacles", "Do the Right Thing"
2009	The Cult	Liam	Episode: "The Other Woman "
2011	Tangiwai: A Love Story	Bert Sutcliffe	Television film
2011–13	The Almighty Johnsons	Anders Johnson	Main role (36 episodes)
2016	Hillary	George Lowe	Main role
2016–17	Westside	Evan Lace	Recurring role (9 episodes)
2017	Wanted	Will Johnson	Recurring role (5 episodes, series 2)
2018	The Brokenwood Mysteries	Barnaby Buchanan	Episode: "The Dark Angel"
2019	The Bad Seed	Ford Lampton	Main role
2019–present	Golden Boy	Aussie Dave	Recurring role (9 episodes)
2020	One Lane Bridge	Andrew "Grub" Ryder	Main role
2021–present	Under the Vines	Griffin	Recurring role (5 episodes)

=== Video game ===
Year	Title	Role	Notes
2014	Lego the Hobbit	Fíli (voice)	Video game
