= Lawless: Beyond Justice =

- Directed by: Geoffrey Cawthorn
- Written by: Stephen Sinclair
- Produced by: Tim Sanders
- Starring: Kevin Smith; Angela Dotchin; Jennifer Rubin
- Cinematography: Mark Olsen
- Edited by: Nicola Smith
- Music by: Peter Blake
- Release date: February 22, 2001
- Running time: 96 min
- Country: New Zealand
- Language: English

Lawless: Beyond Justice is a 2001 New Zealand television film. It stars Kevin Smith as private eye John Lawless alongside Angela Dotchin. It was a sequel of Lawless and Lawless: Dead Evidence.

== Synopsis ==
Private investigator John Lawless investigates an apparent suicide.

== Cast ==
- Kevin Smith as Kevin Smith
- Angela Dotchin as Jodie Keane
- Geoff Dolan as Dave Bruford
- Jennifer Rubin as Lana Vitale
- Bruce Hopkins as Andy Deakin
- Dean O'Gorman as Nat Joseph
- Frankie Stevens as Phil Mayo

== Reception ==
The New Zealand Herald critic Frances Grant says "Lawless manages to give Auckland an exciting big city look, which is mildly cheering if you happen to live there and like to think you're living somewhere groovy. There's also plenty of action. The fight scenes result in realistic and, it must be said, some distinctly unglamorous-looking injuries. And, just when the plot is really beginning to pall, there is a nice big explosion." Phil Hall of Daily-Reviews called it a "a predictable though entertaining B-Movie". He gave it 3 stars and wrote "As directed by Geoffrey Cawthorn, Beyond Justice moves at a crisp pace which never sags even as the plot moves in a direction whose goal can be seen long before it is reached. If the film seems very familiar, it is. But for non-discriminating viewers, Beyond Justice provides a harmless quick fix to satisfy a crime drama addiction until the new TV season debuts.". Aaron J. Bossig also from Daily-Reviews noted "Beyond Justice isn’t a bad movie, and is actually a few levels above most made-for-TV fare. It’s just a clear case where some areas weren’t written and acted as well as others. It’s a dime novel of a movie, you’ll have to take the bad with the good."
