= The Suicide Theory =

2014 Australian film

- Theatrical film poster
- Directed by: Dru Brown
- Written by: Michael J. Kospiah
- Produced by: Dru Brown; Dan Macarthur; Christian McCarty; Jake McCarty; Melanie Poole
- Starring: Steve Mouzakis; Leon Cain
- Cinematography: Dan MacArthur
- Edited by: Ahmad Halimi
- Music by: Rolf Meyer
- Production company: Seven8 Media
- Distributed by: Freestyle Releasing
- Release date: 4 June 2014 (Dances With Films)
- Running time: 98 minutes
- Country: Australia
- Language: English
- Box office: $6,434 (US)

The Suicide Theory is a 2014 Australian thriller film directed by Dru Brown and written by Michael J. Kospiah. It stars Steve Mouzakis as a hit man and Leon Cain as the suicidal man who hires him. It premiered on 4 June 2014 at the Dances With Films film festival in Los Angeles, California. Freestyle Releasing released it in the US and Canada on 10 July 2015.

== Plot ==
As Steven discusses his wife's pregnancy with a friend who owns a store, a rude man interrupts them. Steven ambushes the man outside and murders him. Shortly afterward, his wife Annie is killed in a hit-and-run accident as they cross the street together. Steven is left with traumatic flashbacks whenever he attempts to cross a street. Three years later, Steven works as a contract killer. As he prepares to kill his next target, Frank Dubois, a man falls from the building on to the cab he is in, setting off another panic attack.

Having seen Steven before passing out, the suicidal man, Percival, tracks down Steven. Percival explains that he has attempted suicide countless times and has consistently failed, surviving overwhelming odds, and these attempts have left him heavily scarred. Percival believes he is cursed with the inability to take his own life, and his meeting Steven is meant to be. He pays Steven to kill him. Steven, scoffing at the idea, gives Percival a chance to reconsider, then shoots him in the chest. When Percival survives both this and another shooting from Steven, which leaves him blinded in one eye, Steven accepts it is more than mere luck.

Intrigued by the challenge, Steven probes Percival for clues to defeat the curse. Percival reveals that he is a gay man and that part of his suicidal tendencies come from the death of his boyfriend, Christopher. The two men slowly bond over their shared loss.

Steven hires a gay man to sleep with Percival, hoping that an emotional high may make him mortal; this too fails, and Percival is disgusted when Steven murders the other man. As they consider their next course of action, Percival flirts with a friendly bartender. They end up at the bartender's house, where the barkeep and several of his homophobic friends severely beat up Percival. After learning about this, Steven feigns homosexuality at the same bar and allows himself to fall into the bartender's scam. Steven kills all of the bartender's friends and shoots the bartender in the groin. Percival is once again disgusted by Steven's behavior, but Steven insists that Percival must have wanted this to happen at some level, or else he would not have given Steven the bartender's address.

Steven experiences continued reluctance in killing Frank Dubois, much to the annoyance of his employer, Thomas. Steven learns Percival is a painter and sees him working on a portrait of Chris. When Percival comes to Steven's house, he sees Annie's dress and abruptly leaves. That night, Steven puts on his wife's dress and makeup, and points a gun at his head. Before he can pull the trigger, he sees a thug about to kill a policeman outside. Steven kills the thug and saves the policeman's life. He excitedly calls Percival, thanks him, and explains that he has found his purpose in life and now believes in fate. Steven later approaches Frank and tells him that Frank is not a contracted target. Steven has been killing people based on a half-remembered license plate ever since Annie's death to hopefully get to his wife's killer. He resolves to stop doing this, much to Thomas' dismay.

Percival confesses that it was he who accidentally killed Annie while drunk driving after Christopher's death. He begs Steven for forgiveness. Steven refuses to forgive him. After sharing a hug, he pushes him off his balcony. Percival finally dies. Steven meets with Thomas at a restaurant and says he is quitting; it is revealed that Thomas is only part of Steven's hallucination. After Percival's funeral, Steven visits a gallery of Percival's work. When he sees Christopher's finished portrait, he is horrified to recognize him as the rude man from the store, whose murder set in motion his own tragedy. Steven wanders into the street in a daze and sees Annie beckon him on the other side. As he crosses the street, a truck strikes him. When Steven wakes up, a doctor tells him that he is lucky to be alive. Steven smiles bitterly like Percival had previously done when told the same thing.

== Cast ==
- Steve Mouzakis as Steven Ray
- Leon Cain as Percival
- Joss McWilliam as Thomas
- Matthew Scully as Brad
- Zoe de Plevitz as Annie
- Sean Frazer as Barkeep
- Todd Levi as Doctor
- Erin Connor as Jessica
- Mirko Grillini as Frank
- Paul Geoghegan as Chris

== Release ==
The Suicide Theory premiered at the Dances With Films film festival in Los Angeles, California, on 4 June 2014. Freestyle Releasing released it on 10 July 2015 in the United States and Canada.

== Reception ==
Rotten Tomatoes, a review aggregator, reports that 78% of 18 surveyed critics gave the film a positive review; the average rating is 5.97/10. Metacritic rated it 51/100 based on five reviews. Justin Chang of Variety called it "a contrived but weirdly compelling thriller". Frank Scheck of The Hollywood Reporter called it a "fiendishly clever thriller". Martin Tsai of the Los Angeles Times wrote, "Although Michael J. Kospiah's script isn't exactly predictable or didactic, it does feel contrived and improbable on occasion." John Hartl of The Seattle Times rated it 3/4 stars and wrote, "As curiosities go, this one could belong in cult-movie heaven." Charles Bramesco of The Dissolve rated it 1.5/5 stars and wrote, "A fatal excess of meaningless metaphysical jibber-jabber chokes the life out of this film".

=== Accolades ===
Award	Category	Subject	Result	Ref
Austin Film Festival	Audience Award — Dark Matters	Dru Brown	Won	
Austin Film Festival	Audience Award — Dark Matters	Michael J. Kospiah	Won	
Dances With Films	Grand Jury Award — Feature Film		Won	
