= Time Bomb (2006 film) =

2006 television film directed by Stephen Gyllenhaal

- UK DVD cover
- Genre: Drama; Thriller
- Written by: Frank Military
- Directed by: Stephen Gyllenhaal
- Starring: David Arquette; Angela Bassett; Richard T. Jones; Sabine Karsenti
- Theme music composer: Louis Febre
- Countries of origin: United States; Canada
- Original language: English

Production
- Producers: Frank Military; Josette Perrotta
- Cinematography: Denis Lenoir
- Editors: Victor Du Bois; Maysie Hoy
- Running time: 83 minutes
- Production companies: Paramount Network Television Productions; TB Productions

Original release
- Network: CBS
- Release: March 19, 2006

Time Bomb is a 2006 television film starring David Arquette and Angela Bassett, by CBS Television.

== Plot ==
During a football game in Washington, D.C., a terrorist makes a bomb threat to the DHS, stating that a bomb is in a stadium. Meanwhile, the family of DHS agent Mike Bookman (Arquette), are taken hostage. This brings out issues of suspect and trust amongst colleagues as the terrorist is suspected to be amongst them.

== Cast ==
- David Arquette as Mike Bookman
- Angela Bassett as Jill Greco
- Richard T. Jones as Douglas Campbell
- Sabine Karsenti as Deanne Mitchell
- Tara Rosling as Lynn Bookman
- Simon Reynolds as Richard Zawadski
- Gianpaolo Venuta as Agent Brian Goodman
- Carlo Rota as Musab Hyatti
- Fajer Al-Kaisi as Al-Fatwa
- Lynne Adams as FBI Agent Lawton
- Devon Goyo as Sean Bookman
- Jayne Heitmeyer as Audio Tech Marin
- Carlo Rota as Musab Hyatti
