= Angela Dotchin =

New Zealand actress

- Born: Angela Marie Dotchin; 31 March 1974 (age 52); Auckland, New Zealand
- Occupations: Actress (formerly), personal assistant
- Years active: 1992–2005

Angela Marie Dotchin (born 31 March 1974 in Auckland) is a retired actress best known for her roles as Kirsty Knight in Shortland Street, and as Emilia Rothschild in Jack of All Trades and for starring as Kora on Young Hercules.

== Personal life ==
Dotchin was born on 31 March 1974. Her father is a businessman of Welsh ancestry, with whom she travelled extensively, before the family returned to New Zealand in 1985. Dotchin also has an older sister. She attended Meadowbank Primary, in Meadowbank, Auckland and Selwyn College, in Kohimarama, Auckland.

Dotchin was in a relationship with New Zealand actor, Temuera Morrison for six years.

== Career ==
In 1990, at the age of sixteen, Dotchin began modelling. Her first audition was for the role of Kirsty Knight in the long-running soap opera Shortland Street. Shortland Street was set in a private hospital, and Kirsty was one of the two receptionists. Later she moved 'upstairs', where she became PA to the clinic's medical director.

North American audiences were introduced to Angela by her roles in the Hercules: The Legendary Journeys and Xena: Warrior Princess series, as well as the Hercules spin-off show Young Hercules. Her popularity from these roles helped her land a starring role opposite Bruce Campbell in the short-lived television series Jack of All Trades.

Subsequently, she has appeared as Auckland private investigator Jodie Keane in a trilogy of made-for-TV thrillers: Lawless, Lawless: Dead Evidence and Lawless: Beyond Justice.

Dotchin moved to the United Kingdom in 2002, and currently works as a personal assistant in the fashion industry.

== Filmography ==
Year	Title	Role	Notes
1992–1998	Shortland Street	Kirsty Knight	TV series
1998	Xena: Warrior Princess	Soraya	Episode: "Tsunami"
1998–1999	Young Hercules	Kora	18 episodes
1999	Hercules: The Legendary Journeys	Nautica	Episode: "Love on the Rocks"; Episode: "My Best Girl's Wedding"
1999	Lawless	Jodie Keane	TV movie
1999–2001, 2002–2005, 2009	Chart Choice	Host	Music show
2000–2001	Jack of All Trades	Emilia Smythe Rothschild	22 episodes
2000	Lawless: Dead Evidence	Jodie Keane	TV movie
2001	Lawless: Beyond Justice	Jodie Keane	TV movie
2004	Serial Killers	Chrissy	Episode: "Product Placement"
2005	Maiden Voyage	Renee Price	TV movie

== Awards ==
=== Wins ===
1999
New Zealand Television Award, for Lawless

=== Nominations ===
1997
NZ Film and Television Awards, for Shortland Street
1994
NZ Film and Television Awards, for Shortland Street
