= Bonjour Timothy =

- Directed by: Wayne Tourell
- Written by: David Parry
- Produced by: Micheline Charest; Murray Newey; Antony I. Ginnane
- Starring: Dean O'Gorman; Stephen Papps; Sabine Karsenti
- Cinematography: Matt Bowkett
- Edited by: Jean-Marie Dot
- Music by: Dan Tierney
- Production companies: CINAR Films; Tucker Films Ltd.
- Distributed by: Alpha Media
- Release date: 1995
- Running time: 98 minutes
- Countries: New Zealand; Canada
- Language: English

Bonjour Timothy is a 1995 Canadian-New Zealander romantic comedy film directed by Wayne Tourell and starring Dean O'Gorman, Stephen Papps and Sabine Karsenti.

== Plot ==
Bonjour Timothy is a coming of age story of a young French-Canadian girl who goes on exchange to Auckland. The story follows Timothy, played by Dean O'Gorman, a young New Zealand boy who develops a crush on Michelle, played by Sabine Karsenti, the young French-Canadian girl from Montreal who is living with his family on her exchange. The story follows Timothy, a social underdog in his school, as he goes through a period of self-discovery, and tries to gain the attention of his crush, Michelle. This story depicts the trials and tribulations associated with being in high school, and the awkward stages that accompany being a young adult.

The New Zealand Film Commission describes Bonjour Timothy as, "In Bonjour Timothy (1995) the underdog wins the affection of the girl against all odds, in a film about coming-of-age anxieties over sex and love" (Aveyard, Moran & Veith 2018).

Buzzfeed described Bonjour Timothy as, "The Best Teen Movie You've Never Heard Of."

== Cast ==
- Dean O'Gorman as Timothy Taylor
- Stephen Papps as Mr. Blisker
- Sabine Karsenti as Michelle Dubois
- Sylvia Rands as Mary
- Sydney Jackson as Roger
- Milan Borich as Nathan
- Angela Bloomfield as Vikki
- Richard Vette as Derek
- Raewyn Blade as Ms. Brathwaite
- Nathaniel Lees as Mr. Wiley
- Jay Saussey as Melissa Anderson

== Production ==
The film was shot largely at and around Avondale College in Auckland, New Zealand.

Film Crew:

- Director: Wayne Tourell
- Producers: Murray Newey, Micheline Charest
- Writer: David Preston
- Editor: Jean-Marie Drot
- Cinematography: Matt Bowkett
- Production Design: Brett Schwieters
- Composer: Daniel Scott
- Costumes: Pauline Bowkett

== Awards ==
- 1996 Berlin Film Festival; Kinderfilmfest, Children's Jury - Honourable Mention
- 1995 New Zealand Film and Television Awards; Nominated for Best Director, Best Male in a Dramatic Role (Dean O'Gorman), Best Female in a Dramatic Role (Sylvia Rands) and Best Male Performance in a Supporting Role (Milan Borich)
- 1995 Cinemagic International Film and Television Festival for Young People (Northern Ireland); Best Feature Film
- 1995 Griffoni Film Festival (Italy); Critics Prize, Nominated for Best Actor (Dean O'Gorman)
