= Sabine Karsenti =

French-Canadian actress (born 1974)

- Born: September 1, 1974 (age 51); Montreal, Quebec, Canada
- Occupation: Actress
- Years active: 1990–present

Sabine Karsenti is a French Canadian actress. Karsenti has played in both film and television, in French and in English from Montreal to Los Angeles.

== Career ==
On the big screen, Karsenti has been in the role of Chrissie in Battlefield Earth. She also held several other leading roles, including The Favorite Game, Musketeers Forever and Bonjour Timothy, shot in New Zealand. Karsenti has had smaller roles in feature films such as Cadavre Exquis première édition, presented at the World Film Festival of Montreal in 2006. She was also part of the distribution of American films Time Bomb and The Perfect Marriage.

On the small screen, Karsenti starred in the series The Crow: Stairway to Heaven in which she played Shelly Webster.

== Personal life ==
Karsenti graduated from the Lee Strasberg Theatre and Film Institute and the Stella Adler Studio of Acting.

== Filmography ==
=== Film ===
Year	Title	Role	Notes
1990	Laura Laur		
1995	Silent Hunter	Laura	
1995	Size 8 1/2	Jodie	Short Film
1995	Bonjour Timothy	Michelle Dubois	
1996	A Cry in the Night (Le Cri de la nuit)	Stéphanie	
1998	Chance or Coincidence		
1998	Elysian Fields	Waitress 1	Short Film
1998	The Girl Next Door	Julie	TV movie
1998	Musketeers Forever	Malila	
2000	Battlefield Earth	Chrissy	
2003	The Favorite Game	Tamara	
2004	Premier juillet, le film	Kate	
2006	Bethune	Frances Campbell	TV movie
2006	Time Bomb	Deanne Mitchell	TV movie
2006	The Perfect Marriage	Kendra	TV movie
2006	Cadavre Exquis première édition	Maya	
2007	Til Lies Do Us Part	Rebecca	TV movie
2007	The 3 L'il Pigs (Les 3 p'tits cochons)	Infirmière de Lucille	
2010	City of Shadows (La Cité)	Malika	

=== Television ===
Year	Title	Role	Notes
1996	Hercules: The Legendary Journeys	Sera	Episode: "The Wedding of Alcmene"
1998–1999	The Crow: Stairway to Heaven	Shelley Webster	22 episodes
2002	Sacred Ground		Episode: The Lesser of Evils
2006	Naked Josh	Wanda	Episode: Beating the Rap
2007	Stephen King's Dead Zone	Nancy	Episode: Outcome
