= The Crow: Stairway to Heaven =

Canadian superhero television series

- The Crow: Stairway to Heaven title card
- Genre: Superhero; Urban fantasy; Dark fantasy; Supernatural; Neo-noir
- Based on: The Crow by: James O'Barr
- Written by: Brent V. Friedman; Naomi Janzen; Peter M. Lenkov; John Turman
- Directed by: Scott Williams
- Starring: Mark Dacascos; Marc Gomes; Sabine Karsenti; Katie Stuart
- Narrated by: Mark Dacascos; Sabine Karsenti
- Theme music composer: Peter Manning Robinson and Cherish Alexander
- Countries of origin: Canada; United Kingdom; United States
- Original language: English
- No. of seasons: 1
- No. of episodes: 22

Production
- Producers: Bryce Zabel; Edward Pressman
- Cinematography: Attila Szalay
- Editors: Charles Robichaud; Richard Schwadel
- Running time: 43 minutes
- Production companies: Crow Productions; Alliance Communications; Alliance Atlantis Communications; Crescent Entertainment; PolyGram Television
- Budget: $1.5 million per episode

Original release
- Network: Syndication
- Release: September 25, 1998 – May 22, 1999

The Crow: Stairway to Heaven is an American-British-Canadian superhero television series created by Bryce Zabel. It originally aired from September 25, 1998, to May 22, 1999, consisting of 22 episodes. The series was based on the Caliber Press' The Crow comic book series and was produced by PolyGram TV, Alliance Communications, and Crescent Entertainment Limited Production, in association with Edward R. Pressman Film Corp. It marked the latter's first television effort. Mark Dacascos starred as protagonist Eric Draven, taking over the role from Brandon Lee who had originated the character on screen in the 1994 film. Stairway to Heaven served as an alternative sequel to the film and ignores the film's sequels.

== Synopsis ==
Exactly one year after being brutally murdered, rock musician Eric Draven returns searching for a way to right what was wronged and to reunite with his missing soulmate Shelly Webster. Guided by a mystical spirit crow, he is neither living nor dead, possessing strange new powers to aid him in his search for revenge which, ultimately, must become a quest for redemption.

== Cast ==
=== Main cast ===
- Mark Dacascos as Eric Draven/The Crow, Eric was the lead guitarist in rock band Hangman's Joke. Exactly one year after his murder and the rape/murder of his fiancée, Shelly at the hands of T-Bird and his crew, he returns from the dead. Imbued with regenerative powers, heightened strength, and immortality. He seeks to "set the wrong things right", and ultimately return to Shelly and move on to the Land of the Dead.
- Marc Gomes as Daryl Albrecht, Albrecht was the detective heading up the Draven-Webster murder investigation and initially thinks Eric may have been responsible for Shelly's death, and then faked his own to escape justice. As the series progresses he begins to trust and befriend Eric; until he becomes an ally in his quest for redemption - even at the risk of damaging his own career.
- Sabine Karsenti as Shelly Webster, Shelly was a photographer; who was murdered by T-Bird's crew after getting caught in the wrong place at the wrong time. After Eric is sent back to the Land of the Living, she waits for him, unwilling to move on to the Land of the Dead without him.
- Katie Stuart as Sarah Mohr, Argumentative and headstrong, with a dry humor Sarah is a 13-year-old kid with a rough upbringing. She befriends Eric and Shelly; who became parent-like figures to her before their murders. She becomes Eric's closest friend after his return, helping him in any way she can.

=== Recurring cast ===
- Lynda Boyd as Darla Mohr, Darla is Sarah's mother, and works the front desk at Albrecht's precinct. A recovering alcoholic, her relationship with her daughter is sometimes strained.
- Jon Cuthbert as David Vincennes, Vincennes is a police lieutenant and Albrecht's boss. They share a close friendship, although Vincennes "plays by the rules" and is suspicious of Albrecht's relationship with Draven.
- Christina Cox as Jessica Capshaw, when Albrecht's relationship with Draven starts to raise eyebrows among his superiors, Capshaw is brought in as his new partner. Young and inexperienced, she often finds herself left out of the loop by Albrecht.
- John Pyper-Ferguson as Jason "Top Dollar" Danko, the manager of the Blackout nightclub, Top Dollar ran contract killings for Mace Reyes using T-Bird and his crew as muscle before Draven returned and shut them down. After Draven's return, Top Dollar becomes obsessed with gaining the power of a crow and goes after Draven in order to be killed by him in search of becoming a crow. After being killed by Eric Draven, he appears as a phantom and manifests supernatural powers; waiting till the time comes he will be able to return as a snake.
- John Tench as "T-Bird", the leader of a gang of criminals; who serve as muscle for Top Dollar's criminal operations. He leads the gang in killing Eric and Shelley.
- Julie Dreyfus as India Reyes, India was the manager of the Blackout before it was bought by Mace Reyes; whom she married. She later resumes her old role, hoping to bring the club back from its dark past.
- Gaetana Korbin as Shea Marino, Shea is an employee of the Blackout; who harbors at least a physical attraction to Draven - if not more. It is in the course of helping her escape the attentions of her abusive ex-husband that truly brings Draven to the attention of the law.
- Suleka Mathew as Cordelia Warren, Albrecht's girlfriend, and Port Columbia's District Attorney, Cordelia is strong-willed and intolerant of the kind of vigilante-style tactics Draven utilizes. Albrecht's friendship with Draven ultimately causes problems between him and Cordelia.
- Ty Olsson as George "Funboy" Jamieson, one of T-Bird's crew, Funboy was Darla's boyfriend; until Draven's return. Even after finding religion and repenting for his sins, he finds himself as a pawn working against Draven. He was later killed by the dark version of the Crow.
- Darcy Laurie as Mark "Tin-Tin" Tremayne, one of T-Bird's minions. He is the one who uses his throwing knives to attack Eric Draven in the alleyway. He hangs out with the gang.
- Kadeem Hardison as Skull Cowboy, cryptic with a dark sense of humor, the Skull Cowboy is a guide in the Land of the Living for all the "poor souls" like Draven who find themselves in the limbo between life and death. Although he is a bystander for the most part; allowing each course of action to play itself out, he is willing to get involved in certain situations.
- Bobbie Phillips as Hannah Foster/Talon, like Draven, Hannah has returned from death to put the wrong things right. However, unlike Draven; Hannah constantly struggles between the need for redemption and her lust for vengeance on the men who murdered her and her daughter. Even afterwards, her methods are far more vicious than Draven's.

=== Guests cast ===
- Mark Rolston as Mace Reyes, a corrupt businessman and a snake.
- Glenn Morshower as Falcon, a corrupt FBI agent working for the Mafia.
- John Hawkes as Jake Thompson, a suicidal stunt motorcyclist.
- Corey Feldman as Chris Draven, Eric's estranged half-brother.
- Anthony Michael Hall as Reid Truax, a serial killer.

== Episodes ==
No.	Title
1	"The Soul Can't Rest"
A year after he and his fiance Shelly Webster were murdered, Eric Draven returns as a Crow to get revenge on gang leader Top Dollar and his henchmen T-Bird, Tin Tin and Funboy.
2	"Souled Out"
Eric goes after the man who hired Top Dollar, corrupt businessman Mace Reyes, who is secretly a Snake, an evil version of a Crow.
3	"Get a Life"
After a woman is killed in a shooting, Shelly's spirit asks Eric to find the killer and clear the name of the victim's ex-boyfriend, Gil.
4	"Like It's 1999"
When one of her friends joins an anarchic gang, Sarah infiltrates it to save him, only to end being taken prisoner by the group's leader, Shane Gant.
5	"Voices"
Eric tries to help Jesse Hickock, the medium of a visiting carnival whose powers are being exploited for criminal ends by unscrupulous ringmaster Doc Connell.
6	"Solitude's Revenge"
Greg Kessler, a murderer who Albrecht arrested, is released from prison and captures Albrecht, who he begins hunting for sport on abandoned island off the coast of Port Columbia.
7	"Double Take"
Shelly's identity is stolen by a woman who is on the run from a corrupt FBI agent who is working for the Mafia.
8	"Give Me Death"
Top Dollar escapes from an asylum and goes on a rampage, intent on forcing Eric to kill him in the belief that this will give him the powers of a Crow.
9	"Before I Wake"
A despondent Eric undergoes an experimental form of hypnosis to try and contact Shelly, and instead ends up being possessed by the spirit of a previous Crow named Blackfeather.
10	"Death Wish"
Eric befriends suicidal stunt motorcyclist Jake Thompson at the behest of the ghost of Thompson's young son, Casey. While working to reunite the two, Eric uncovers a plot to assassinate Thompson.
11	"Through a Dark Circle"
An occult ritual that Eric performs in an attempt to reach Shelly accidentally summons the spirit of executed serial killer Richard Lee Wilbanks, whose demonic powers can harm even Eric.
12	"Disclosure"
The Blackout is bought by crooked real estate developer Frank Moran, the abusive husband of Eric's friend Shea. Eric infiltrates and dismantles Moran's organization for Albrecht, who is forced to turn Eric over to Internal Affairs.
13	"The People vs. Eric Draven"
In a clip show, Eric is put on trial for the murder of Shelly Webster.
14	"It's a Wonderful Death"
Incarcerated after being found guilty of Shelly's murder, Eric is placed in an unwinnable time loop of the night that she died by the Skull Cowboy after wishing, "What I really want is to be back with Shelly before this whole nightmare started."
15	"Birds of a Feather"
After being acquitted of Shelly's murder, Eric meets Doctor Hannah "Talon" Foster, a new Crow who was killed alongside her daughter, Rebecca.
16	"Never Say Die"
A deranged Russian criminal uses a cursed manuscript, four ritual murders and the power that resides within Eric's loft to become the host of the evil spirit of Rasputin.
17	"Lazarus Rising"
Eric becomes the unwitting test subject of the Lazarus Group, an ancient secret society whose leader, Frederick Balsam, seeks to achieve immortality by transferring his mind into the body of a Crow.
18	"Closing Time"
Acting through an agent named Soleil Hazard, Top Dollar uses a mystical melody to enthrall Eric and the rehabilitated Funboy.
19	"The Road Not Taken"
Eric and Hannah break up a human smuggling ring, and rescue a baby named Celia Meyers.
20	"Brother's Keeper"
Guided by the spirit of their father, Eric has an uncomfortable reunion with his troubled stepbrother Chris, who is hiding money from the Mafia.
21	"Dead To Rights"
As a serial killer who specifically targets police officers runs amok in Port Columbia, Eric begins finding it harder and harder to control his actions as the Crow.
22	"A Gathering Storm"
After acquiring a new body, Frederick Balsam murders every other member of the Lazarus Group, and uses a dark ritual to separate Eric and the Crow, which abducts Shelly, who had been sent by Heaven to try and save the now powerless Eric.

== Production ==
=== Development ===
In November 1997, it was announced that PolyGram and Alliance Communications had made a deal with the Edward R. Pressman Film Corp. to produce a syndicated series set within The Crow universe, described "pick(ing) up where the first film left off." Pressman stated that the series was being developed due to his belief that the graphic novel's mythology was written in a way which lent itself to multiple stories being told and was particularly well suited to an episodic TV adaptation. Crescent Entertainment ultimately helped to co-produce the series as well. PolyGram Television President Bob Sanitzky later told of how when the studio had sent promotional head shots of Dacascos in to get developed, the developer and mistaken Dacascos for Brandon Lee. This phone call and cemented Sanitzky's belief that Dacascos, whom he felt could do justice to both the acting and martial arts requirements of the role, was truly the ideal candidate to follow in Lee's footsteps as Eric Draven.

=== Filming ===
Production began on June 1, with filming taking place in and around Vancouver, British Columbia, which stood in for the series' fictional city of Port Columbia. The series was budgeted at $1.5 million per episode. Several scenes were filmed inside the top floors of the Sun Tower, and at the BC Museum of Mining in Britannia Beach. A special effects explosion went wrong during filming on August 15, 1998, when stuntman Marc Akerstream was struck on the head and killed by flying debris. At the time of the accident, six of the twenty-two episodes had been filmed. Production was suspended for approximately ten days, but the series's release date remained unaffected.

=== Music ===
As with each of the movie adaptations and the original comic book, underground music played a key role in the show. Bands such as Econoline Crush and Mudgirl made guest appearances on the show, while the source music included tracks by Rob Zombie, The Crystal Method, Delerium, Bif Naked, The Painkillers, Oleander, and Xero). Two tracks from Peter Himmelman's 1998 album Love Thinketh No Evil, "Fly So High" and "Seven Circles", were re-recorded for use by Eric Draven's band, Hangman's Joke, with the latter song becoming a major plot point during the early episodes of the series.

=== Broadcast history ===
By January, the series had been pre-sold to 47 markets making it available in half the country. The figure had climbed to 75% of the country by March and 95% in the weeks leading up to the series premiere.

In late 1999 and throughout 2000, the series was aired extensively on The Sci-Fi Channel in the United States and the United Kingdom. In March 2010, CBS Action in the UK aired the series.

== Reception ==
=== Critical reception ===
Early in its run, television programming executive Ruth Lee Leaycraft identified Stairway to Heaven as being one of the most likely to succeed out of the sixteen fantasy and science fiction themed syndicated dramas that were currently airing. She perceived that the series' quality was indicative of a serious effort on PolyGram's part to make a name for themselves in the syndicated television field. Mediaweek felt that the series was one of the few new action shows that season which stood a legitimate shot at becoming a hit.

=== Ratings ===
The series premiered on September 21, 1998 and achieved 2.4 Nielsen rating and a 1.4 among adults aged 19–49. Variety described its performance "a solid start" for the series. Subsequent episodes saw an uptick in viewership, and it ended the year with a 2.7 rating, with the year's final episode drawing its largest audience yet and a 3.3 rating. By April, the first season's performance was described as having successfully launched the series.

=== Cancellation ===
Despite positive reviews the series was cancelled after one season in June 1999, when PolyGram was sold to Universal Studios. Universal had initially stated their intention to continue the series, citing what they felt was strong international appeal, however they eventually reversed their decision based on what was described as "a combination of domestic and international factors." The producers planned to make a television movie to wrap up the major loose ends from the cliffhanger at the end of the final episode, but it never materialized.

Later, Bryce Zabel said that he planned to make a six-hour miniseries to wrap up the show. According to him, the series would pick up five years after the events of the finale.

== DVD releases ==
On March 17, 2005, all 22 episodes were released in a 5-disc DVD boxed set in central Europe through Dutch distributor A-Film. The set features the original broadcast trailer, a behind-the-scenes featurette, and interview snippets with cast members Mark Dacascos, Marc Gomes, Sabine Karsenti, Katie Stuart and John Pyper-Ferguson, fight co-ordinator James Lew, crow handler Dave Sousa, director of photography Attila Szalay, and executive producers Bryce Zabel and Brad Markowitz.

2005 also saw a bare-bones episode-only release of the series in Australia on six discs across two volumes via Warner Bros.; this release was preceded by an even more basic single disc through Magna Pacific which featured the pilot and two "bonus" episodes.

On July 24, 2007, Arts Alliance America released The Crow: Stairway to Heaven - The Complete Series in a five-disc, region 1 DVD set in. This set features an extensive array of special features including commentaries, a photo gallery and a gag reel.

On February 15, 2011, Alliance Home Entertainment released The Crow: Stairway to Heaven - The Complete Series on DVD in Canada only.

== Awards and nominations ==
Year	Award	Category	Nominee	Result	Ref
1999	Leo Awards	Best Cinematography in a Dramatic Series	Attila Szalay	Nominated	
1999	Leo Awards	Best Picture Editing in a Dramatic Series	Richard A. Schwadel	Nominated	
