= Under the Vines =

New Zealand television series (2021–2024)

- Genre: Comedy drama
- Created by: Erin White
- Starring: Rebecca Gibney as Daisy Monroe; Charles Edwards as Louis Oakley; Sarah Peirse as Marissa; Trae Te Wiki as Tippy; Simon Mead as Gus; Cohen Holloway as Vic; Carrie Green as Nic
- Theme music composer: The East Pointers
- Composer: Claire Cowan
- Country of origin: New Zealand
- Original language: English
- No. of seasons: 3
- No. of episodes: 18

Production
- Executive producers: Rebecca Gibney; Richard Fletcher; Brendan Dahill
- Cinematography: David Paul NZCS
- Running time: 45 minutes
- Production companies: Libertine Pictures; Perpetual Entertainment (Note: Credited as EQ Media Group for Series 1–2); Hardy White Pictures; Acorn TV; TVNZ

Original release
- Network: Acorn TV
- Release: 6 December 2021 – present

Under the Vines is a New Zealand comedy drama television series created by Erin White for Acorn TV.

== Plot ==
Two step-cousins — Australian socialite Daisy Munroe and UK lawyer Louis Oakley — inherit a declining New Zealand vineyard, Oakley Wines, in the fictional Peak View wine district located in the real wine district of Central Otago. The joint heirs have no experience with wine-making or New Zealand rural culture, and each is having financial, social, and existential crises. They become interested in the winery's future but frequently don't see eye-to-eye. Furthermore, a neighbouring vineyard wants to buy Oakley Wines and is unhappy that the inexperienced newcomers might stay.

== Cast and characters ==
=== Main ===
- Rebecca Gibney as Daisy Monroe: a Sydney socialite and stepdaughter and financial dependent of recently deceased Stanley Oakley.
- Charles Edwards as Louis Oakley: a UK lawyer with a failing marriage and financial troubles and nephew to Stanley.
- Sarah Peirse as Marissa Silverton: Peakview's local socialite, President of the wine Federation board and co-owner of neighbouring 'Shimmering Lake' vineyard, keen on buying Oakley Wines at a low price.
- John Bach as Don Silverton: Marissa's husband and co-owner of 'Shimmering Lake' vineyard.
- Trae Te Wiki as Tippy (Isabella) Bidois: Oakley's young, adventurous and newly successful vintner/winemaker.
- Simon Mead as Gus: Manager of the vines and physical 'grunt' of the Oakley vineyard.
- Cohen Holloway (Series 1–2) Allan Henry (Series 3) as Vic Grimes: A local lawyer managing the sale of Oakley Vineyard and also a small time winemaker and husband of Nic Grimes.
- Carrie Green as Nic Grimes: a clay sculptor with a quest to improve her fertility and have a child.
- Catherine Wilkin as Hilary van der Boor, owner of nearby vegan, biodynamic and lesbian winery Coven Wines, holder of winemaking wisdom, and practitioner of naked gardening.

=== Recurring ===
- Dean O'Gorman as Griffin 'Griff' Galway: Daisy's gay best friend, an Australian famous international actor.
- Lotima Pome'e as Rowan: a young, multiply employed, local worker and entrepreneur.
- Sara Wiseman as Simone Oakley: Louis's wife from whom he is separated.
- Sam Gardner as Julian 'Jay' Oakley: Louis's son.
- Unknown Cat as Pussy Galore: The elusive three-legged cat that belongs to the Oakley Vineyard.
- Angella Dravid as Stacey (Series 2-): a surly nurse working at David's practice.
- Kirk Torrance as David (Series 2-): local doctor and love interest for Daisy, they are engaged by the end of series 2.
- Amanda Billing as Yvonne (Series 2-): local police officer and love interest for Louis.
- Mark Mitchinson as William McVallum (Series 2-): introduced in the last episode of series 2, William arrived at Oakley claiming to have been left half of the estate.
- Geoffery Dolan as Roger (Series 3): a handyman brought in by William to redesign the cellar door.

== Episodes ==
=== Season 1 (2021) ===
No. overall	No. in season	Directed by	Written by	Original release date
1	1	Danny Mulheron	Timothy Balme & Erin White	6 December 2021
Oakley Wines owner Stanley has passed away and left the winery to two city-slicker heirs: Step-daughter Daisy from Australia and nephew Louis from the UK. They wrangle and disagree over what to do with the struggling vineyard as the lives of each are unravelling. Rival winemakers Marissa and Don Silverton - secretly dependent on the quality of the Oakley grapes - make a under-value offer to buy Oakley Wines which leads to a contentious decision for the new owners.
2	2	Danny Mulheron	Nick Ward & Erin White	6 December 2021
Daisy takes an interest in the winery, but Louis wants to sell-up and leave quickly. Tippy tries to interest Louis in the art of winemaking and raise his interest in making the winery financially viable, with the added motivation for her and Gus to keep their jobs and make something of their past efforts at the winery. Louis seeks advice from neighbor Hillary of Coven Wines with the aim of selling the winery as a 'going concern'. Louis and Daisy visit to the bank but it doesn't go so well. Robert the builder passes through and Daisy takes an interest in him plus asks him to quote for repair work.
3	3	Danny Mulheron	Erin White	13 December 2021
Louis' estranged wife and son - Simone and Julian - visit Louis at Oakley for a short holiday. Daisy encourages the team to prepare the winery for the 'Behind the Vines' showcase, but to be accepted she needs to impress her rival and the head of the board, Marissa Silverton. Daisy meets Ben at the 'Church' wine bar and she becomes friendly with the smitten Ben as they 'haggle' over the price of his used fridge which is up for sale. Over wine, she criticizes local 'bully' Marissa and finds out Ben is the son of Marissa and Don Silverton. Louis wants to win back his wife Simone, but is clueless how to do it. Julian and the other kids disappear from the working bee and get into trouble.
4	4	Danny Mulheron	Josephine Stewart-Te Whiu & Erin White	20 December 2021
Daisy photographs the uncomfortable Tippy for the showcase promotion. Louis is sulking since Simone confirmed their breakup will be permanent. Tippy and Gus start disciplining Louis like a child to help with the winery. Griff visits to cheer up Daisy and they have lunch at the "Church' wine bar while Daisy slyly ignores Ben. Louis attempts to plant some trees but ends up in the pub and has a romantic liaison. Griff and Gus become friendly while planting trees. Griff takes Daisy for a spa day, but she forgets her commitment to attend Nic's fertility ceremony. Griff and Daisy argue over each ones avoidance of commitment. Griff for Gus and Daisy for Louis. Louis overheard the argument and is a miffed as he was starting to like Daisy.
5	5	Danny Mulheron	Kathryn Burnett & Erin White	27 December 2021
Daisy starts to spend more time with Ben and ignoring apology messages from Griff. Gus is distracting himself putting excessive energy into preparing a pergola. Tippy has vineyard problems. Louis panics when Julian goes missing in the UK. Ben helps Daisy pickup furniture.
6	6	Danny Mulheron	Harry McNaughton & Erin White	3 January 2022
Daisy and Louis try to explain to Julian how the half-cousin-joint-heirs woke up on the 'small' blanket by the former evenings outdoor fire, appearing to be cuddling. It's the day before the showcase and everyone is busy in preparation as Nic Grimes brings news of a very favourable wine review in the local paper. Marissa Silverton is not happy with this news. Tippy is dreading her looming speech as the Gold-Medal winning vintner of Oakley and Daisy offers guidance. Griff arrives to hide from a 'uncloseting' scandal he is denying, leaving Gus a little confused and disappointed. A lavatory disaster leads Marissa's to cancel her extravagant Gala-Dinner. Daisy starts giving Ben the cold shoulder but offers Oakley as an alternative dinner venue and most Federation board members agree to it. Daisy appreciates Louis defending her against a jealous outburst from Marissa. Tippy freezes during her speech, but eventually finds her voice and gives a killer speech. Daisy breaks it off with Ben as Marissa turns up drunk. Daisy encourages her to go home and for Ben to take her. The elusive 3 legged cat, Pussy Galore, finally appears. Louis and Daisy are falling for each other, but Simone calls and wants Louis back.

=== Season 2 (2023) ===
No. overall	No. in season	Directed by	Written by	Original release date
7	1	Joshua Frizzell	Kelly Lefever & Erin White	23 January 2023
Louis makes a last-ditch attempt to save his marriage, while Griffin tries to rescue his romance with Gus by coming out online. At rival winery Shimmering Lake, Marissa plots to bring Oakley down a peg by hiring a flashy French vintner.
8	2	Joshua Frizzell	Harry McNaughton & Erin White	23 January 2023
Tippy gives everyone a lesson in grape-picking. Daisy meets handsome local doctor David. Vic asks Louis to help him out with a potentially serious legal problem. Gus and Griff decide to go on their first romantic trip away together.
9	3	Joshua Frizzell	Nick Ward & Erin White	30 January 2023
Facing financial pressures, Oakley Wines invites the bank manager for a tour and Tippy goes old school by heating the vineyard with flaming pots and help from the community.
10	4	Katie Wolfe	Steph Matuku & Erin White	30 January 2023
Daisy and Louis attend Marissa's infamous book club but Daisy gets the wrong book to read. Louis discovers Hilary's eyesight is failing, which caused her vintage to fail and goes on a crusade to help her.
11	5	Katie Wolfe	Kathryn Burnett & Erin White	6 February 2023
The crew head to Queenstown to support Tippy at a wine conference. Daisy and Louis end up sharing a dodgy motel room and Louis overhears Philippe arguing with another vintner, confirming his suspicions and plots with Daisy to expose him.
12	6	Katie Wolfe	Erin White	6 February 2023
Daisy and Louis discuss what happened in Queenstown. Tippy's new blend is incredible although she's left Oakley thinking she's a failure. An old friend of Stanley's turns up with news about Oakley that will rock everything to the core.

=== Season 3 (2024) ===
No. overall	No. in season	Directed by	Written by	Original release date
13	1	Erin White	Nick Ward & Erin White	19 August 2024
Gus returns to Oakley wine whilst Daisy Monroe and Louis Oakley trying to legally oust the annoying William who claims he owns half the vineyard.
14	2	Erin White	Kathryn Burnett & Erin White	19 August 2024
In an effort to get William out of the house, Daisy challenges him to a winner-takes-all game of Texas hold 'em. Nic confesses there is something wrong with one of the twins.
15	3	Erin White	Steph Matuku & Erin White	26 August 2024
Daisy and Louis adjust to their new living arrangements and try to steal Williams' thunder at the opening of their new cellar door but are distracted by the impending arrival of Nic and Vic's twin babies.
16	4	Laurence Wilson	Erin White	2 September 2024
Daisy and Louis are forced to spend the night together when their truck breaks down in the middle of nowhere, while Nic and Vic cope with the birth of their new babies.
17	5	Laurence Wilson	Harry McNaughton & Erin White	9 September 2024
Daisy tries to bond with her future step-daughter, Sienna, on a trip to go wedding dress-shopping. An out-of-his-element Louis fears for his life on David's stag-do camping trip.
18	6	Laurence Wilson	Erin White & Kelly Lefever	16 September 2024
Daisy finally makes it to the altar to marry the man she loves in front of the people who matter most in her life.

== Production ==
Development for Under the Vines had been announced in December 2020, when EQ Media Group, later known as Perpetual Entertainment, New Zealand entertainment production studio Libertine Pictures and Acorn TV's co-production/distribution division Acorn Media Enterprises announced a new six-part television series entitled Under the Vines with New Zealand broadcasting network TVNZ and global streaming service Acorn TV had commissioned the series to be aired in New Zealand and internationally while it stars English actor Charles Edwards as the grumpy British/Kiwi, Louis Oakley and Australian actress Rebecca Gibney as Sydney socialite, Daisy Munroeas, two unlikely city slickers who inherit a failing vineyard in rural New Zealand.
