= Lawless (1999 film) =

- Directed by: Chris Martin-Jones
- Written by: Gavin Strawhan
- Produced by: Bruce Sheridan
- Starring: Kevin Smith; Angela Dotchin
- Cinematography: Matt Bowkett
- Edited by: Nicola Smith
- Music by: Peter Blake
- Release date: 1999
- Running time: 96 min
- Country: New Zealand
- Language: English

Lawless is a 1999 New Zealand television film. It stars Kevin Smith as undercover cop John Lawless. It was filmed in Auckland in January 1999 and costarred Angela Dotchin. It was nominated for seven New Zealand Academy of Film and Television Arts awards, winning five. It was followed by two more telemovies, Lawless: Dead Evidence and Lawless: Beyond Justice.

== Synopsis ==
Undercover cop John Lawless is falsely accused of murder. Together with Jodie Keane he investigates the case to clear his name.

== Cast ==
- Kevin Smith as John Lawless
- Angela Dotchin as Jodie Keane
- Geoff Dolan as Detective Sergeant Dave Bruford
- Ross Duncan as Alan Snow
- Joel Tobeck as Terry Bowers
- Calvin Tuteao as Willy Kaa
- Tahei Simpson as Sonya Davidson
- Susan Brady as Marla Lawless
- Elizabeth Hawthorne as Susan Ellis
- Bruce Hopkins as Andy Deakin

== Reception ==
Sarah Daniell in the Evening Post called it "a simple story told with a dash of subtlety and style" and wrote "The makers of Lawless are not exactly breaking new ground in originality, but neither do they glamourise or moralise over drugs, and never is there that subliminal finger-wagging or tut-tutting that whacks you over the head." Bruce Elder in The Sydney Morning Herald called it "a topnotch cop story." He says "The plot line is fast and suitably complex. The acting makes most Aussie cop shows look like amateur theatrics. And the settings are a neat mixture of the rough end of town and picture-postcard NZ." In the Age Paul Kalina says "in terms of production values and storylines this is unremarkable, below-par fare."

== Awards ==
New Zealand Academy of Film and Television Arts awards 1999

- Best Drama Programme - won
- Best Director, Drama - Chris Martin-Jones - won
- Best Actress - Angela Dotchin - won
- Best Supporting Actor - Joel Tobeck - won
- Best Contribution to a Soundtrack - Chris Burt (for sound design) - won
- Best Actor - Kevin Smith - nominated
- Best Supporting Actress - nominated

== Sequels ==
- Lawless: Dead Evidence (2000)

Jodie Keane finds ex-undercover cop turned bouncer John Lawless to get his helping solving an old murder. She believes the accused has been framed. C. Thomas Howell plays the accused.

- Lawless: Beyond Justice (2001)

Private investigator John Lawless and his colleague investigate an apparent suicide. Jennifer Rubin plays their client.
