= Kevin Smith (New Zealand actor) =

New Zealand actor and musician (1963–2002)

- Born: Kevin Tod Smith; 16 March 1963; Auckland, New Zealand
- Died: 15 February 2002 (aged 38); Beijing, China
- Occupations: Actor, musician
- Years active: 1983–2002
- Spouse: Suzanne (m. 1986)
- Children: 3

Kevin Tod Smith (16 March 1963 – 15 February 2002) was a New Zealand actor and musician, best known for starring as the Greek god of war, Ares, in the TV series Hercules: The Legendary Journeys and in its two spin-offs – Xena: Warrior Princess and Young Hercules.

== Early life ==
Kevin Smith was born in Auckland in 1963. His mother was of Tongan and German ancestry and his father (of English descent) hailed from New Zealand. Smith's family moved to the South Island town of Timaru when he was eleven. He attended Timaru Boys' High School from 1976 to 1979. He was involved in the drama club at his high school.

Smith played in rock and roll bands during high school, working out each morning at the gym and watching television in the afternoon. He painted and played rugby and hoped to become a member of New Zealand's world-famous rugby team, the All Blacks.

At the age of 17, Smith moved to Christchurch, where he lived in a flat above a fruit shop, worked at various jobs, and considered joining the police to help children, before enrolling in Canterbury University at the age of 20. In 1986, he married his high school sweetheart, Suzanne (Sue), with whom he had three sons: Oscar, Tyrone, and Willard.

== Career ==
Smith played in several lo-fi experimental bands in New Zealand and released a few albums with Say Yes to Apes and Hyphen-Ears in the mid-1980s.

After suffering a concussion while playing university rugby union in 1987, Smith was forced to sit on the sidelines for almost three weeks. His wife saw a casting call advertisement for the touring musical tribute to Elvis Presley, Are You Lonesome Tonight, and signed up Kevin for an audition. He got the role of bodyguard JoJoe and was the lead understudy. Later that year, Smith joined Christchurch's Court Theatre and performed on stage for the next three years in a variety of roles including Don Pedro in Shakespeare's Much Ado About Nothing and Stanley Kowalski in Tennessee Williams' A Streetcar Named Desire.

In 1989, Smith co-founded a Christchurch theatresports group, Scared Scriptless, performing live comedy. Later that year he got the role of charming "bad boy" Demian Vermeer on the New Zealand primetime soap opera Gloss, and moved to Auckland to work on the series' final season.

In 1993, Smith played Lawrence Hayes in Desperate Remedies. He then appeared as Paul Cosic in the last two seasons of the primetime drama Marlin Bay. For this role, he won the 1995 New Zealand Film and Television Award for Best Supporting Actor.

He screen-tested for the lead role in Paramount's big budget action-film The Phantom, but the role ultimately went to Billy Zane instead. His fellow Hercules: The Legendary Journeys cast member, low-budget-movie actor and Pacific Renaissance Pictures partner Bruce Campbell, was also one of the contenders for the role of the legendary superhero.

Also in 1995, Smith appeared on Hercules: The Legendary Journeys as Hercules' half-brother, Iphicles. Later he joined the cast of Xena: Warrior Princess as Ares, a role he would later play on Hercules and Young Hercules as well. As the dark and dangerously seductive Greek god of war, Smith gained legions of fans. During this time Kevin performed as Ares on Hercules: The Legendary Journeys, Xena: Warrior Princess and Young Hercules simultaneously.

While starring on Xena, Hercules and Young Hercules, Smith also appeared in other TV shows and films, notably as a Vietnam veteran in the feature film Channelling Baby and as detective John Lawless in three TV movies: Lawless (1999), Lawless: Dead Evidence (2000), and Lawless: Beyond Justice (2001). For the first he was nominated for the New Zealand Academy of Film and Television Art award for Best Actor. In the mockumentary Love Mussel (2001) he played himself covering the story of a small town in New Zealand following the discovery that a local shellfish, the geoduck, has similar effects to Viagra.

Smith also continued to act in the theatre. During his career, he also appeared on several cassettes of alternative music, alongside other musicians, under the band names "The Picnic Boys" and "Say Yes to Apes" which was later renamed "Hyphen-Smythe". He was one of the lead singers of the celebrity band "The Wide Lapels", a band famous for its campy performances of the worst songs of the 1970s.

== Death ==
Early in 2002, Smith (who was preparing for his first Hollywood role in the Bruce Willis action film Tears of the Sun) went to China to shoot the US-Chinese martial arts film Warriors of Virtue 2.

On 6 February 2002, Smith completed his work on the set in Shijiazhuang, 270 km southwest of Beijing. After celebrating with staff from Beijing Film Studio, and while waiting for a ride back to the hotel, he decided to walk around the China Central Television film studio grounds, and climbed a prop tower on the set of another film. He lost his footing and fell three stories, suffering severe head injuries. Smith was rushed by staff to a local hospital, then transferred to Beijing. He lapsed into a coma and was kept on life support for ten days until life support was discontinued. He died on 15 February without regaining consciousness.

Smith was buried after a private funeral on 28 February 2002. The launch of the Kevin Smith Trust for Smith's children was announced later that day at a memorial service attended by old friends, New Zealand's acting community, and over a thousand mourners at the Aotea Centre, Auckland.

A television documentary celebrating Smith's life and career, Remembering Kev: A Tribute to Kevin Smith, aired on TV2 on the first anniversary of his death.

== Works ==
=== Albums with The Picnic Boys ===
- 1982 Meet the Radiant Simians split with Rhythm Doktor
- 1982 Here Comes The Jungle
- 1982 Crumbs, It's A Pterodactyl!
- 1983 The Mojave Desserts
- 1983 The Music for Bathrooms

=== Albums with Say Yes to Apes ===
- 1983 Who's That
- 1983 "Knife" (single)
- 1984 The Decline And Fall Of ...

=== Albums with Hyphen-Ears ===
- 1984 Garden Of Lycanthropy
- 1984 What Are Stars? The Stars Are What Separates Us from the Animals You Sonovabitch!

=== Albums with Legacy Of Ears / Hyphen-Smythe ===
- 1982 The Hamburg

=== Albums as Hyphen-Smythe ===
- 1983 Bad Ass

=== Selected filmography ===
Year	Film	Role	Notes
1987	Gloss		TV series
1991	Mon Désir		
1991	Away Laughing	Various Characters	TV series
1992	Shortland Street	Jed	TV series
1993	Desperate Remedies	Lawrence Hayes	
1994	Kevin Rampenbacker and the Electric Kettle		
1994	Marlin Bay	Paul Cosic	TV series
1995-1999	Hercules: The Legendary Journeys	Ares/Iphicles	TV series recurring role; 23 episodes
1995-2001	Xena: Warrior Princess	Ares	TV series recurring role; 30 episodes
1996	McLeod's Daughters	Rod	TV movie
1998	Flatmates	Scott	TV series
1998	Hercules and Xena - The Animated Movie: The Battle for Mount Olympus	Ares (voice)	direct-to-video
1998	Young Hercules	Pelias/Ares	TV movie
1998-1999	Young Hercules	Ares	TV series recurring role; 16 episodes
1999	Channelling Baby	Geoff	
1999	Lawless	John Lawless	TV movie
2000	Lawless: Dead Evidence	John Lawless	TV movie
2000	Jubilee	Max Seddon	
2001	The Meeting	Wallace Greenway	
2001	Lawless: Beyond Justice	John Lawless	TV movie
2001	Love Mussel	himself	TV movie
2002	Warriors of Virtue: The Return to Tao	Dogon	
2003	Riverworld	Valdemar	TV movie (voice; final role)

=== Guest appearances ===
Year	Title	Role	Episode
1996	City Life	Damon South	1.1
1996	City Life	Damon South	1.2
1998	F/X: The Series	Ricky Delacruz	2.13 "Vigilantes"
2000	Guess Who's Coming to Dinner?	Himself	3.4
