= Geoff Dolan =

New Zealand actor & singer

Geoffrey Patrick Dolan (known as Geoff Dolan) (born 29 December 1964 in Lower Hutt, New Zealand) is a New Zealand actor, singer and corporate entertainer who is probably best known in recent times as recurring character, Derrick/Thor in The Almighty Johnsons. He resides in Auckland.

Geoffrey hails from Wainuiomata. Geoff is also a popular corporate entertainer, singer and stage performer. His voice can be heard on many commercials on New Zealand television.

== Filmography ==
=== Film ===
- Chunuk Bair (1992) as Machine Gunner
- Typhon's People (1993) (TV) as Maitre D
- Lawless (1999) (TV) as Detective Sergeant Dave Bruford
- Lawless: Dead Evidence (2000) (TV) as Detective Sergeant Dave Bruford
- Lawless: Beyond Justice (2001) (TV) as Detective Sergeant Dave Bruford
- No One Can Hear You (2001) as Deputy Phil
- Grace (2002)
- Cheesey Goodness (2004) as Billy the Kid
- In My Father's Den (2004) as O'Neill
- Spooked (2004) as Simmonds
- Hugh and Heke (2006) as Hugh
- Sione's Wedding (2006) as Drunk singing in Jail
- Siege (2012) as Police Commissioner Howard Broad
- The Z-Nail Gang (2014) as Sergeant Smith
- The Kick (2014) as Steven Hansen
- Friend of the Friendless (2020) as Dryan Guy
- X (2022) as Deputy

=== TV Work ===
- Gloss as Neil Palmer (1987)
- Shark in the Park as Wayne Hassett (1989)
- Riding High as Paul Frazer (1995)
- Hercules: The Legendary Journeys as Orent / Henchman / Fashion Police Officer (1997, 1999; 3 episodes)
- Xena: Warrior Princess as Odd-job Man #1 (2000; 1 episode)
- Jack of All Trades as Lucianni (2000; 1 episode)
- Mercy Peak, episode "What She Least Expected" (2001) as Ross Duval
- Mataku, episode "The Fishing Trip" (2002) as Ron
- Power Rangers Ninja Storm
  - "Storm Before the Calm: Part 1" (2003) as Official
  - "Storm Before the Calm: Part 2" (2003) as Official
- Power Rangers Dino Thunder
  - "Strange Relations" (2004) (voice) as Jade Gladiator
- Power Rangers S.P.D.
  - "Missing" (2005) (voice) as Herock
  - "Endings: Part 1" (2005) (voice) as Omni
  - "Endings: Part 2" (2005) (voice) as Omni
- Power Rangers Mystic Force (2006) (voice) Koragg the Knight Wolf & other monsters
- Kai Korero (2006) as Ken
- Wendy Wu: Homecoming Warrior (2006) as Museum Security Guard
- Power Rangers Jungle Fury (2008) as voice of Dai Shi (spirit/monster form)
- Outrageous Fortune (2010) Steve Brownlow (2 episodes)
- Hugh & Heke (2010) Hugh Harcourt
- The Almighty Johnsons (2011) as Derrick/Thor
- Power Rangers Samurai
  - "Clash of the Red Rangers" (2011) as Sergeant Tread (voice)
- Power Rangers Megaforce (2013) as Gosei (voice)
- The Coins of McGuffin (2015) as The Exposition
- Power Rangers Ninja Steel (2017) as Charity Worker
- Westside (2017) as Neville
- Power Rangers Beast Morphers (2020) as Koragg the Knight Wolf (Redubbed archive footage)
- Power Rangers Dino Fury (2021) as Reaghoul
- Sweet Tooth (2021) as Doug Duncan
- Far North (2023) as Gerad
- Our Flag Means Death (2023) as Priest
- Under the Vines (2025) as Roger
