= Dan Macarthur =

- Born: Daniel Macarthur; 13 November 1970 (age 54); Australia
- Occupation: cinematographer
- Spouse: Melanie Poole
- Website: danmacdp.com

Dan Macarthur is an Australian film director and director of photography and founder of 18° Entertainment.

== Career ==
In 2014 Macarthur shot Yennai Arindhaal starring Ajith Kumar Directed by Gautham Menon which was released in over 1000 cinemas worldwide and was received very highly by audiences and critics with Macarthur's cinematography praised for bringing a Hollywood look to Tamil cinema.

In 2013 Macarthur wrote and directed gangster comedy feature film Nice Package, about a wannabe professional thief, his gay best friend, a sexy hostage and a package everybody wants. The film stars The Tribe heart throb Dwayne Cameron, funny man Leon Cain and Australian actress Isabella Tannock. Nice Package was produced by Macarthur and Melanie Poole, co-founder of 18° Entertainment.

As a Director of Photography, Macarthur has received highly acclaimed awards for his work on a number of feature films, most notably 2013 action thriller film Absolute Deception starring Academy Award winner Cuba Gooding Jr., directed by Brian Trenchard-Smith who described Macarthur as being "up there with the best DOP's I have ever worked with."

In 2011, Macarthur shot Bollywood hit Go Goa Gone starring Saif Ali Khan, India's first zombie comedy. Macarthur was also DOP on 2013 psychological thriller The Suicide Theory starring Steve Mousakis I, Frankenstein; Australian gangster action film Blood Money starring Pitbull and KungFu legend Gordon Liu and 2009 thriller Sleeper.

During the years 2003 and 2005, Macarthur was also Director of Photography for Russell Crowe's band Thirty Odd Foot of Grunts, shooting three of their music videos and an international tour documentary. Macarthur also shot an Oprah Winfrey segment at Russell's Farm.

Macarthur's early career also included a string of successes shooting music videos for big name Australian Bands like Powderfinger, The Whitlams, Killing Heidi, John Butler Trio and many more.

In 2014, he started working on a Tamil movie Yennai Arindhaal starring Ajith Kumar which was directed by Gautham Vasudev Menon. It released on 5 February 2015, to generally positive reviews. Dan's work received high acclaim, for bringing a noir-like look to the story, in sync with the tone of the film. He also shot Gautham Menon's Achcham Yenbadhu Madamaiyada. Gautham Vasudev Menon mentioned in one of his interviews that he is willing to work with him for more than 10 films in a row.

== Awards ==
In 2015, Macarthur was awarded a Bronze Award for Cinematography for Go Goa gone at the Australian Cinematography Awards (Qld). In 2012, Macarthur won Gold for Best Cinematography in a Feature Film at the Australian Cinematography Society's Awards (QLD).

In 2000 Macarthur shot the award-winning short film Stop, which was accepted into the Cannes Film Festival, the only Australian short to be accepted that year.

Macarthur's music clips also received many awards for Best Cinematography including the National ACS Golden Tripod Award for the Best Cinematography for a Music Video for The Whitlams' "Blow Up the Pokies" in 1999.
