= Yennai Arindhaal =

2015 Indian film by Gautham Vasudev Menon

- Theatrical release poster
- Directed by: Gautham Vasudev Menon
- Written by: Gautham Vasudev Menon
- Additional Screenplay & Script Consultants by: Shridhar Raghavan Thiagarajan Kumararaja
- Produced by: S. Aishwarya; A. M. Rathnam (Presenter)
- Starring: Ajith Kumar; Arun Vijay; Trisha Krishnan; Anushka Shetty; Anikha Surendran; Vivek
- Cinematography: Dan Macarthur; S. R. Kathir
- Edited by: Anthony
- Music by: Harris Jayaraj
- Production company: Shri Sai Raam Creations
- Distributed by: M K Enterprises
- Release date: 5 February 2015 (India)
- Running time: 176 minutes
- Country: India
- Language: Tamil
- Budget: ₹50 crore
- Box office: est. ₹70 crore

Yennai Arindhaal (transl. If You Know Me; stylised on-screen as Yennai Arindhaal...) is a 2015 Indian Tamil-language action thriller film written and directed by Gautham Vasudev Menon and produced by S. Aishwarya. The film stars Ajith Kumar, Trisha Krishnan, Anushka Shetty and Arun Vijay in the lead roles, while Vivek, Anikha, Parvathy Nair, Ashish Vidyarthi, Suman and Avinash Yelandur appear in supporting roles. It is also the final film of Menon's police trilogy after Kaakha Kaakha and Vettaiyaadu Vilaiyaadu. The film revolves around a former police officer's battle to protect his step-daughter from his arch-enemy.

Menon decided to finalise the script in October 2013 with Shridhar Raghavan and Thiagarajan Kumararaja as the script consultants. Principal photography was launched on 9 April 2014, and its first schedule took place in Chennai on 11 April 2014 within 12 days. The second schedule of the film took place in May 2014, where the filming took place in Chennai, Hyderabad, Rajasthan, Sikkim and a few parts of Malaysia. The music was composed by Harris Jayaraj, reuniting with Menon after Vaaranam Aayiram (2008). Dan Macarthur handled the cinematography, while Anthony edited the film.

Yennai Arindhaal was released theatrically on 5 February 2015 to positive reviews from critics. At the 63rd Filmfare Awards South, the film was nominated under five categories including Best Actor for Ajith Kumar, Best Supporting Actor for Arun Vijay, Best Music Director for Harris Jayaraj and Best Lyricist for Thamarai. The film was nominated for six categories under the 5th South Indian International Movie Awards, in which Arun Vijay won the award for Best Actor in a Negative Role – Tamil.

== Plot ==
In 2015, Thenmozhi, a carefree girl from Chennai, comes to Boston to meet her newborn niece. Three weeks later, while leaving for Chennai at the airport, Thenmozhi gets a free upgrade to first class. During the flight, she starts vomiting due to overeating, but she feels better with the help of her co-passenger, Sathyadev, and she develops a crush on him. The next day in Chennai, Sathyadev and Thenmozhi meet at a cafe. Victor Manoharan, a notorious gangster, arrives with his gang to abduct Thenmozhi, but Sathya's intervention causes Victor and his men to retreat.

In 1989, Sathya's father gets killed by a gangster, after which the 14-year-old Sathya makes a decision. In 2002, Sathya is seen in prison with Victor, where he fights along with Victor in a botched attempt to kill the latter. They escape jail, and Sathya arranges Victor's marriage to his love interest, Elizabeth "Lisa". Sathya and Victor meet Matthew, an illegal organ dealer, and Sathya infiltrates the gang, revealing himself as an IPS of the T.N.P.D Crime Branch. Sathya kills Matthew and engages in combat with Victor, where Sathya brutally wounds Victor, who swears vengeance on Sathya.

Two years later, in an attempt to nab a gangster at Egmore Railway Station, Sathya helps a pregnant woman named Hemanika, who immediately needs to get to a hospital for delivery. Two years later, Sathya meets Hemanika and her child Isha again. After meeting and getting to know each other over 3 years, they plan to get married. On the eve of their marriage, Hemanika is brutally murdered, which leaves Sathya heartbroken, but Isha is saved as she was with him that night. Sathya meets and kills his adversary, Golden Raj and his men but was severely injured. He also know that Raj didn't killed Hemanika. Sathya hides the fact from Isha by telling her that Hemanika had left somewhere far away and that she wanted him to take care of her. Sathya decides to quit his job and travels with Isha around India, with his colleague DCP Richard's help.

Sathya returns to Chennai after 4 years, where he learns that his friend Saravanan's 15-year-old daughter Niranjana has gone missing. He discovers that Victor has resurfaced and is stealing organs illegally with foreign doctors to earn millions. Victor is trying to save his wealthy customer Muruganandham, who needs a heart transplant. Sathya finds the child and eventually the organ theft network's next target, Thenmozhi. Sathya is reinstated in the police department and leaves for Boston.

In the present, Sathya lets Thenmozhi stay in their house with Isha. In an attempt to get Thenmozhi, Victor and his team kidnap Isha, who is held captive by Lisa. Victor tells Sathya that he will release Isha only if he surrenders Thenmozhi, which Sathya accepts. When they arrive at the location, they kill Muruganandham. Sathya finds Thenmozhi's location and leaves to locate Isha, who is held at knifepoint by Lisa and attempts to stab Isha, which makes Sathya shoot and kill Lisa, leaving Victor heartbroken.

Victor sneaks into Sathya's house, kills all the officers positioned in Sathya's house, and reveals himself as Hemanika's killer. The duo engages in a bloody fight, where Sathya mortally wounds Victor in the same way Hemanika was killed. Sathya drags a wounded Victor outside and leaves his colleagues to kill him. Isha and Thenmozhi plan out the former's birthday. Thenmozhi promises to be with Isha throughout the day. Before taking Isha home, Sathya reminds Thenmozhi of the pending coffee that Thenmozhi wants to have with Sathya, indicating that Sathya is ready to move on with Thenmozhi.

== Cast ==
- Ajith Kumar as DCP Sathyadev IPS
- Arun Vijay as Victor Manoharan
- Trisha Krishnan as Hemanika
- Anushka Shetty as Thenmozhi
- Parvathy Nair as Elizabeth "Lisa"
- Vivek as "Revolver" Richard IPS, DCP, Intelligence
- Anikha Surendran as Isha, Sathyadev and Hemanika's daughter
- Ashish Vidyarthi as Golden Raj
- Suman as Muruganandham
- Nassar as Sathyadev's father
- Avinash as Hemanika's father
- R. N. R. Manohar as Sathya's uncle
- Stunt Silva as Father Matthew
- Amit Bhargav as Thenmozhi's proposed groom
- Besant Ravi as Victor's friend
- Bhawana Aneja as Thenmozhi's sister
- Rajasimman as Kandha
- Mona Kakade as Heart Patient's mother
- Jayaprakash Radhakrishnan as Saravanan
- Rekha Suresh as a brothel owner
- K. P. Sekar as a police officer
- Cell Murugan as police officer
- Pondy Ravi as police constable
- Osthe J. Ram as a henchman
- Aathma Patrick as a henchman
- Ramjee as a reporter
- Daniel Balaji as a gangster who murders Sathya's father (special appearance)
- Rajeevan as Danny (special appearance)
- Gautham Vasudev Menon as a police officer (special appearance)
- Aditi Balan as Hemanika's student (uncredited appearance in the song "Mazhai Vara Pogudhae")

== Production ==
=== Pre-production ===
In October 2013, producer A. M. Rathnam signed up Ajith Kumar for another film following their collaboration in Arrambam (2013). Initially, the producers approached director Gautham Vasudev Menon to direct the Tamil remake of Race 2 (2013) but Menon was not interested in the remake and came up with an original storyline which later became Yennai Arindhaal.

=== Development ===
Shridhar Raghavan, who wrote the script for the Bollywood film, Dum Maaro Dum (2011), was also signed by the team to assist Gautham Menon with film's script. Thiagarajan Kumararaja is also credited for the screenplay. Harris Jayaraj was signed on as composer, (Note: The film marks Harris Jayaraj's reunion with Gautham Menon after six years. The last time they collaborated was for Vaaranam Aayiram (2008).) despite early speculations that A. R. Rahman would work on the film.

Anirudh Ravichander had hinted about himself working in the film, but his inclusion remained unconfirmed and ultimately proved to be untrue. Australia-based cinematographer Dan Macarthur was selected to do the film's cinematography. On 29 October 2014, Suresh Chandra, Ajith's agent, confirmed the title for the film to be Yennai Arindhaal (Well, if you know me...). The title of the dubbed Telugu version was announced as Entha Vaadu Gani (No matter how strong the opponent is...) along with a few poster designs on 23 November 2014.

=== Casting ===
Anushka Shetty was signed on by the team to play the main lead, despite early suggestions that Amy Jackson had been selected for the film. Prior to the official announcement of the cast, several actors were linked to portray the role of the antagonist in the film, including Karthik and Prashanth. Actors Aadhi, Arun Vijay, and Arvind Swamy were also reported to be part of the cast, though the latter denied signing the film. Aadhi also clarified on not acting in the film. In mid-April 2014, Arun Vijay was confirmed to portray the film's antagonist and had started filming his portions.

On 18 April 2014, comedian Vivek joined the cast, collaborating with Gautham Menon after the director's first venture Minnale (2001). Bangalore-based Amit Bhargav was selected to play the role of Anushka's beau in the film. Trisha was officially cast as another lead of the film, collaborating with Gautham Menon for the second time after Vinnaithaandi Varuvaayaa (2010). Her role was later confirmed as the love interest of Ajith's character. Actor Arun Vijay was chosen to play a supporting role. Ajith's salary was reported to be around ₹25 crore (US$2.6 million) for the film. Parvathy Nair was cast in a role paired opposite Arun Vijay, making this film the second she signed in Tamil, after the later-released Uttama Villain. Daniel Balaji played a cameo, thus becoming a part of all films in Gautham Menon's cop trilogy. Nassar made a cameo appearance as the father of Ajith's character.

=== Characters ===
Menon stated that details regarding the film would be unveiled by the end of August 2014. As per his statement, Menon later said that Ajith would appear in four different looks in the film, and Anushka would portray an IT professional in the film. Trisha said that her portion in the film would have a more intense love story than her last outing with Gautham Menon, Vinnaithaandi Varuvaayaa (2010). For Trisha's character of Hemanika, stylist Uthara Menon made dresses out of Kanchi cottons and used retro brocade for her dance costumes, while basing her look on actress Shobana. She further said that though Ajith had been playing commercial films off late, this film would show him in a radical avatar that she herself would love to see him in. It was confirmed that Ajith would be sporting black hair, a thick moustache and a slimmer look in the portions involving Baby Anikha and Trisha, whereas he would appear in his natural grey hair style in the portions involving Anushka. According to sources, Ajith would be seen riding a Bullet Bike in the film. Stills featuring Ajith sporting a bearded look were released in early October 2014. In November 2014, Vivek confirmed that his character — a police officer — would be a rather serious character with only a subtle sense of humour.

=== Filming ===
A. M. Rathnam issued an official statement confirming that the film would be launched on 9 April 2014, and a ceremony was thereafter held to mark the beginning of the project. The first filming schedule subsequently began on 11 April 2014 near the VGP Universal Kingdom theme park near Chennai. The first schedule was completed after 12 days of shooting in Chennai, during which an action sequence was filmed.

The second schedule began shooting on 14 May 2014. A lot of nighttime shooting was said to have taken place in the film, especially on Mount Road. Shooting also took place in Malaysia. Dan Macarthur confirmed that the second schedule was completed by the end of May 2014. A wedlock scene between Ajith and Trisha was canned in the last week of July 2014. Shooting continued in Chennai along the ECR stretch up to the first week of August, during which the portions involving Baby Ankitha were completed. In the second week of August 2014, about 75% of the filming was reported to be completed and a few scenes, including a train sequence, were shot in Hyderabad. A scene featuring Ajith and Trisha and background artists was filmed in a theatre.

Filming moved to Rajasthan where a song sequence was shot in segments in Jaipur, Jodhpur and Jaisalmer for 10 days. A romantic song, "Mazhai Vara Pogudhae", which featured Ajith, was shot in September 2014. Filming then proceeded in Sikkim, where a "lullaby" song sequence featuring Ajith and Baby Ankitha was shot. The final schedule of filming began at Hyderabad again, where filming continued for 15 days. By late November, the shoots of all the songs have been done, and a fight sequence was shot in Binny Mills in Meenambakkam, Chennai. A solo song with Trisha was also completed. In early December, shooting of the climax chase sequence was done in guerrilla filmmaking mode in some busy roads of Chennai without the knowledge of the public. Shooting of the climax fight sequences began on 8 December 2014. A few key scenes were shot at Hyderabad Railway Station in mid-December 2014. Later, a few patchwork scenes were shot at Chennai for three days with which principal photography came to an end.

The film was shot entirely on the Arri Alexa digital motion picture camera system.

== Themes and influences ==
Gautham Menon described Yennai Arindhaal as the third in his franchise of police films after Kaakha Kaakha and Vettaiyaadu Vilaiyaadu. It was also the last of the trilogy and described Ajith's character Sathyadev as an "extension" of the protagonists in the first two films.

== Music ==
The film's soundtrack album and background score were composed by Harris Jayaraj, the first time for a film starring Ajith. The soundtrack album consists of seven tracks. Six tracks had lyrics written by Thamarai, and one song was written by Vignesh Shivan. In July 2014, Harris recorded a romantic song sung by Karthik. Harris said that he had recorded a fresh voice from the United Kingdom for the first song in the film, which was later revealed to be Kharesma Ravichandran. The song was planned to be similar to "Karka Karka" from Menon's Vettaiyaadu Vilaiyaadu (2006). In August 2014, Harris started recording the third song for the film. On 18 September 2014, he updated that three songs were completed. It was also known that Trisha's character would have a solo song. In response to the request by Ajith's fans, the makers agreed to release a single track prior to the soundtrack release. The mass number "Adhaaru Adhaaru" sung by Vijay Prakash and Gana Bala, with lyrics written by Vignesh Shivan, was released as the lead single on 11 December 2014. Within hours of its release the track topped the iTunes Indian songs chart. On YouTube, the single track got over 30 thousand hits in 24 hours and was liked by more than 7,000 viewers. Harris Jayaraj confirmed via Twitter that "Adhaaru Adhaaru" was a gangster song and not Ajith's introduction song in the film. Harris Jayaraj was busy working on the final mix of the OST in early December 2014. It was confirmed that the score and the songs would be done in Dolby Atmos surround sound system. The audio rights were purchased by Sony Music, and the album was released on 1 January 2015. The Hindu stated that the music repeated the magic of his last collaboration with Gautham Menon, which was Vaaranam Aayiram (2008).

== Marketing ==
Trisha's first look in the film was revealed in mid-August 2014, where she was seen on the sets sporting a saree. Another still of the actress was made available on 29 August 2014. The film's title and first look poster were reported to be revealed in August 2014, on Ganesh Chaturthi. However, a still featuring Ajith in his black haired look was released instead, where he was pictured riding a Royal Enfield Bike. More stills featuring Ajith and the other cast and crew members were released on the same day.

The first teaser trailer was released on 3 December 2014, and gained over 5 lakh views within 12 hours of its release on YouTube. The teaser received over 15,000 likes in YouTube, the highest number of likes for a South Indian film, in just over a day. The teaser later went on to cross 55,000 likes in three days. The teaser became the most-liked Indian film teaser, which was previously held by Bang Bang! with 61,429 likes at that time. The teaser has crossed five million views on YouTube, becoming the second South Indian film after 'I' to cross this mark, and has received a 92,000 plus likes so far. The official trailer was released on the New Year's Day on 1 January 2015.

== Release ==
=== Theatrical ===
The film was earlier expected to be released in January 2015, but Menon confirmed that the audio launch would take place in November 2014, and the film was planned for a December release. On 22 November 2014, it was confirmed that the film would be released on 11 January 2015, during the festive occasion of Pongal weekend., but the film was again postponed to 30 January due to delays in post-production, and later to 5 February. The film had featured in the Behindwoods list of the "Top 10 most anticipated films of 2014", before its release was delayed to 2015.

=== Home media ===
The satellite rights of Yennai Arindhaal were sold to Jaya TV.

In March 2015, the website Herotalkies.com (VS Ecommerce Ventures) legally released Yennai Arindhaal online in Full HD 1080p with English subtitles, but only for audiences who live outside India.

== Reception ==
=== Critical response ===
Yennai Arindhaal received positive reviews from critics.

Karthik of CNN-IBN gave 4/5 stars and stated "Ajith as the cop, the gangster, the father, and the lover will win you over". M. Suganth of The Times of India gave 3.5/5 stars and wrote, "It does seem less punchy than Kaakha Kaakha and Vettaiyaadu Vilaiyaadu, but the film belongs to Ajith, and the star is in such fine form here". IANS gave 3.5/5 stars and wrote "Despite some tonal and length issues, Gautham impresses mostly in Yennai Arindhaal and gives this tale of a police officer a much need emotional tug".

Karthik Subramanian of The Hindu wrote "Performances lift an otherwise predicatable fare from Gautam Vasudev Menon". Sudhir Srinivasan of The Hindu wrote "A rushed climax, a problematic organ trafficking angle, a repeated plot device, a predictable ending… and yet Yennai Arindhaal comes as a breath of fresh air...There's just that one thin line that stops it from being terrific".

Sify gave 3/5 stars and wrote "Watch Yennai Arindhaal for Ajith’s majestic screen presence and the underlying emotional current". Rediff gave 3/5 stars and wrote, "The backdrop of Yennai Arindhaal is new and the plot is engaging, but the characters, the situation, and even the dialogues are reminiscences of director Gautham Menon's previous cop films".

=== Accolades ===
Date of ceremony	Award	Category	Recipient(s) and nominee(s)	Result	Ref.
2016	IBNLive Movie Awards	Best Actor (South)	Ajith Kumar	Won	
18 June 2016	Filmfare Awards South	Best Actor – Tamil	Ajith Kumar	Nominated	
18 June 2016	Filmfare Awards South	Best Supporting Actor – Tamil	Arun Vijay	Nominated	
18 June 2016	Filmfare Awards South	Best Supporting Actress – Tamil	Parvatii Nair	Nominated	
18 June 2016	Filmfare Awards South	Best Music Director – Tamil	Harris Jayaraj	Nominated	
18 June 2016	Filmfare Awards South	Best Lyricist – Tamil	Thamarai ("Unakenna Venum Sollu")	Nominated	
30 June & 1 July 2016	South Indian International Movie Awards	Best Director – Tamil	Gautham Vasudev Menon	Nominated	
30 June & 1 July 2016	South Indian International Movie Awards	Best Actor in a Negative Role – Tamil	Arun Vijay	Won	
30 June & 1 July 2016	South Indian International Movie Awards	Best Music Director – Tamil	Harris Jayaraj	Nominated	
30 June & 1 July 2016	South Indian International Movie Awards	Best Lyricist – Tamil	Thamarai ("Unakenna Vaenum Sollu")	Nominated	
30 June & 1 July 2016	South Indian International Movie Awards	Best Playback Singer Male – Tamil	Benny Dayal ("Unakenna Vaenum Sollu")	Nominated	
30 June & 1 July 2016	South Indian International Movie Awards	Best Playback Singer Female – Tamil	Chinmayi ("Idhayathai Yedho Ondru")	Nominated	

== Other versions ==
The film was dubbed in Kannada as Sathyadev IPS and was released in 2017.

== Legacy ==
The song "Unakenna Vennum Sollu" inspired a film of the same name.

== Sequel ==
Menon has expressed plans for a sequel since 2018.
