= Lawless: Dead Evidence =

- Directed by: Charlie Haskell
- Written by: Gavin Strawhan
- Produced by: Tim Sanders
- Starring: Kevin Smith; Angela Dotchin
- Cinematography: Mark Olsen
- Edited by: Eric De Beus
- Music by: Peter Blake
- Production company: Frame Up Films
- Release date: September 7, 2000
- Running time: 94 minutes
- Country: New Zealand
- Language: English

Lawless: Dead Evidence is a 2000 New Zealand television film. It stars Kevin Smith as former cop John Lawless alongside Angela Dotchin and C. Thomas Howell. It was a sequel of Lawless and is followed by Lawless: Beyond Justice.

== Synopsis ==
Private investigator Jodie Keane finds ex-undercover cop turned bouncer John Lawless and asks for his help in solving a historical murder case. She believes the man accused of the crimes has been framed.

== Cast ==
- Kevin Smith as John Lawless
- Angela Dotchin as Jodie Keane
- C. Thomas Howell as Dean Riley
- Geoff Dolan as Dave Bruford
- Bruce Hopkins as Andy Deakin
- Ross Duncan as Alan Snow
- Andrew Binns as Graham Newby
- Kim Michalis as Trina Riley
- Stephen Papps as Brendan Roach
- Dean Butler as Gary Sutherland
- Geoffrey Snell as Kevin

== Reception ==
Sarah Daniell in the Evening Post wrote, "It may have been burdened by a cliched premise, good cop-bad cop stereotypes and inferior programming and promotion but it rose above the odds to provide a truly rocking couple of hours of entertainment." She finishes her review "Lawless may not be flawless, but the whole shebang was executed with wit and style, that hell, a girl could get used to this." Bruce Elder in The Sydney Morning Herald described the film as "well-written and hugely entertaining," adding, "There is something wonderfully ragged and realistic about this series and the plot lines are strong enough to ensure that they are much better than most of the predictable cop shows on TV."
