= Nice Package =

- Directed by: Dan Macarthur
- Written by: Melanie Poole; Dan Macarthur
- Produced by: Dan Macarthur
- Starring: Dwayne Cameron; Leon Cain; Isabella Tannock
- Cinematography: Andrew Conder
- Edited by: Scott Walton
- Distributed by: Pinnacle Films
- Release date: 2016
- Running time: 95 minutes
- Country: Australia
- Language: English

Nice Package is a 2016 gangster comedy feature starring Dwayne Cameron, Isabella Tannock and Leon Cain. The film is produced by Melanie Poole and directed by Dan Macarthur.

== Cast ==
- Dwayne Cameron
- Leon Cain
- Isabella Tannock
- Renaud Jadin
- Ashley Lyons
- Ben Weirheim
- Ron Kelly

== Reception ==
Film Ink said, "Nice Package is at its best when it wants to make you smile." DVD Compare, while reviewing the DVD release, said, "Although there are better genre films out there from down under, this is well worth checking out and is better than most."
