= Steve Mouzakis =

Australian actor

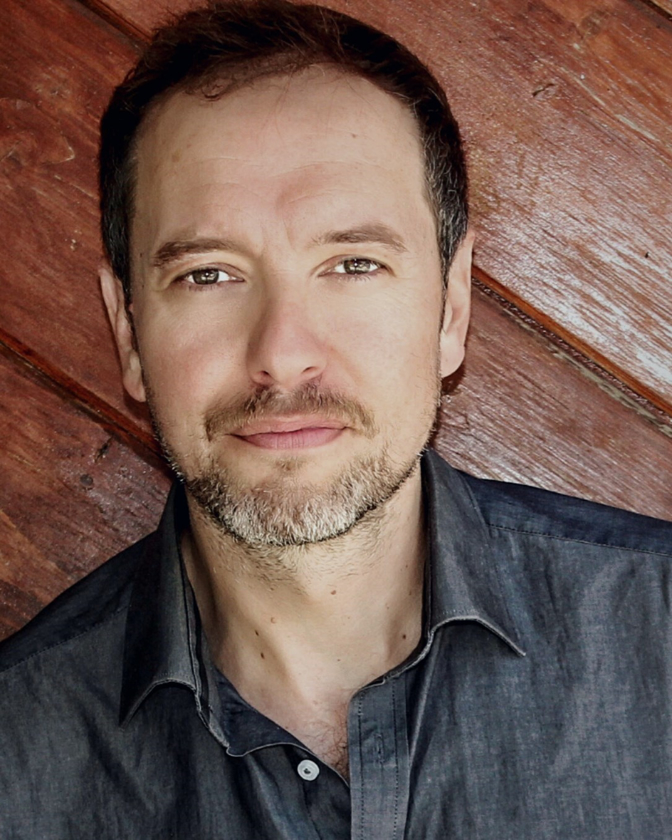
- Born: Melbourne, Victoria, Australia
- Education: Victorian College of the Arts
- Occupation: Actor
- Years active: 1999–present
- Spouse: Christine Mouzakis (m. 2017)
- Awards: Best Actor St Kilda Film Festival; Best Actor, Theatre Companies Green Room Award

Steve Mouzakis is an Australian actor. He is known for his role in the Spike Jonze film Where the Wild Things Are, Van Gogh in Prison Break, Steven Ray in the film The Suicide Theory, and performing alongside Joel Edgerton and Sean Harris as Paul in the 2022 film The Stranger.

== Education ==
Mouzakis studied Arts and Engineering at university before being accepted into the Victorian College Of The Arts to study acting.

He graduated winning the Irene Mitchell Award for Outstanding Achievement for his portrayal of William Shakespeare's Pericles, in a production directed by George Ogilvie.

== Career ==
He was cast in Christos Tsiolkas' Viewing Blue Poles, performed at the Fitzroy Gallery in Melbourne and moving to the Belvoir St. Theatre in Sydney.

His first television role came as that of Paolo in The Secret Life of Us. He was next cast by director Jonathan Liebesman in the horror film Darkness Falls released in 2003.

His interest however in smaller and more personal films led to his performances in the short films Mona Lisa and 296 Smith Street. This brought him to the attention of the director Spike Jonze for his adaptation of the children's story Where the Wild Things Are.

Mouzakis has had a number of roles in television series such as Rolf in Very Small Business, Andrew Petrious in The Slap, Chris Baros in Killing Time, Theo Kallergis in Blue Heelers and Paolo in The Secret Life of Us. Other feature film credits include Darkness Falls (Sony Pictures), Big Mamma's Boy, and I, Frankenstein (Lionsgate).

He played Steven Ray in the 2014 film The Suicide Theory.

Mouzakis played Van Gogh as a series regular in the 2017 comeback of the Fox television series Prison Break.

He also appeared in the Tourism Victoria Wander Victoria campaign in 2017 as the face of his home state of Victoria, Australia.

In February 2024, Mouzakis was announced as part of the cast for Homeward.

In 2025, Mouzakis appeared in the theatre play The Removalists.

== Awards ==
Year	Work	Award	Category	Result
	Pericles (as Pericles) for Victorian College of the Arts	Irene Mitchell Award	Outstanding Achievement	Won
2013	Joey (short film)	St Kilda Film Festival	Best Actor	Won
2014	The Cherry Orchard (as Lophakin) for Melbourne Theatre Company	Green Room Award	Male Actor in the Theatre Companies category	Won

== Filmography ==
=== Film ===
Year	Title	Role	Notes
2002	Obscured by Venus		Short film
2003	Darkness Falls	Dr. Peter Murphy	Feature film
2004	Under the Radar	Lee	Feature film
2004	Mona	George	Short film
2007	The Tragedy of Hamlet Prince of Denmark	Claudius	Feature film
2008	296 Smith Street	Knackers	Short film
2008	Ahmad's Garden	Guard	Short film
2008	The Daily Grind	The Assassin	Short film
2009	Knowing	Head Paramedic	Feature film
2009	Mendel's Tree	Mendel	Short film
2009	Where the Wild Things Are	Max's Teacher	Feature film
2010	Summer Coda	Slick	Feature film
2011	Big Mamma’s Boy	Anton	Feature film
2011	Joey	Joey	Short film
2012	Catch Perfect	Robert	Short film
2014	I, Frankenstein	Helek	Feature film
2014	The Suicide Theory	Steven Ray	Feature film
2014	Two Devils		Short film
2014	The Legend Maker	Graham Rinks	
2015	Lean	Steve	Short film
2015	Hope City	Mr Christou	Short film
2016	Scare Campaign	Tony	Feature film
2015	Downriver	Gianni Depellegrini	Feature film
2016	Sugar Mountain	Randy	Feature film
2017	That's Not Me	Anthony	Feature film
2018	Acute Misfortune	Jim	Feature film
2020	My First Summer	Detective Croydon	Feature film
2022	The Stranger	Paul Emery	Feature film
2023	Late Night with the Devil	Szandor D'abo	Feature film
2024	Double or Nothing	Peter	
2024	Inside	Mel's Case Worker	
2025	The Mediator	Frank Pereirra	Short
TBA	Homeward	Mitch	

=== Television ===
Year	Title	Role	Notes	Ref
2001	The Secret Life of Us	Paolo	TV series, season 1, 5 episodes	
2003	MDA	Bart Saunders	TV series, 1 episode	
2001-04	Stingers	Joey / Lou	TV series, 2 episodes	
2004	Blue Heelers	Theo Kallergis	TV series, 5 episodes	
2006	Nightmares & Dreamscapes: From the Stories of Stephen King	Driver	TV anthology miniseries, 1 episode	
2007	Machine		Video	
2007	Kick	Terry Abruzzi	TV miniseries, 2 episodes	
2008	Satisfaction	Gottleib	TV series, 1 episode	
2008	Very Small Business	Dr Rolf	TV series, 2 episodes	
2009	Whatever Happened to That Girl?	Steve	TV series, 2 episodes	
2010	Rush	Kreiser	TV series, 1 episode	
2011	Cop Hard	The Chief	TV series, 4 episodes	
2011	Killing Time	Chris Baros	TV series, 4 episodes	
2011	The Slap	Andrew Petrious	TV miniseries, 3 episodes	
2014	Fat Tony & Co.	Major George Kastanis	TV miniseries, 2 episodes	
2014	Utopia	Cyclist	TV series, 1 episode	
2017	Prison Break	Van Gogh	TV series. 8 episodes	
2018	Jack Irish	Ryan Neubecker	TV series, 3 episodes	
2019	Ms Fisher's Modern Murder Mysteries	Hans Petersen	TV series, 1 episode	
2019	The ShowBiz Podcast	Self	Podcast, 1 episode	
2019	Wentworth	Detective Russell Minton	TV series, 1 episode	
2020	AussieWood	Steve Wood	TV series	
2021	Why Are You Like This	Charles	TV series, 1 episode	
2021	Clickbait	Detective Zach de Luca	TV miniseries, 5 episodes	
2022	The Pact	Adam	TV series, 5 episodes	
2022	Irreverent	Lorenzo	TV miniseries, 4 episodes	

== Theatre ==
Year	Title	Role	Venue / Co.	Ref
	Pericles	Pericles	VCA	
1999	Viewing Blue Poles	Man	Fitzroy Gallery Melbourne, Belvoir Street Theatre, Sydney	
1998	The Idiot	Ferdyschenko	STCSA for Adelaide Festival	
1999	micky.com.au	Micky	La Mama for Melbourne Fringe Festival	
1999	Brother Boy	Stelio	Dancing Dog Café for Melbourne Big West Arts Festival	
1999-2002	Australian Marriage Act	Robin	QLD & VIC tour with Arena Theatre Company	
	Train Journey		Mainstreet Theatre Company, South Australia	
2002	Crow Fire	Wallace	Malthouse Theatre, Melbourne, with Playbox Theatre Company	
2002	The Waiting Room	Various characters	Victorian Trades Hall with Platform 27 & Melbourne Workers Theatre	
2002	Salt Creek Murders	John / Trooper	Sir Robert Helpmann Theatre, Naracoorte Town Hall, Brenton Langbein Theatre, Geelong Arts Centre, Nautilus Theatre Port Lincoln, Middleback Theatre Whyalla, Keith Michell Theatre Port Pirie, Chaffey Theatre Renmark	
2003	Babel Towers		BlackBox, Melbourne	
2004	7 Days 10 Years	Ivan	Theatre Works, Melbourne	
2007	Red Light Winter	Davis	Stables Theatre, Sydney with Griffin Theatre Company	
2008	The Tragedy of Hamlet Prince of Denmark		Tower Theatre, Melbourne with Malthouse Theatre	
2009	Woyzeck		MTC	
2009	Cafe Rebetika!	Yirgos / Michalis	Victorian Arts Centre	
2010	Syncopation	Henry Ribolow	Chapel Off Chapel, Melbourne, with Auspicious Arts Projects	
2013	The Cherry Orchard	Lophakin	Southbank Theatre with MTC	
2015	Death and the Maiden	Gerardo Escobar	Southbank Theatre with MTC / STC	
2018	Melancholia	John	Malthouse Theatre, Melbourne	
2019	Golden Shield	Richard Warren / Larry Murdoch	MTC	
2021	The Lifespan of a Fact	John D'Agata	Fairfax Studio, Melbourne, with MTC	
2023	What If If Only	P	Southbank Theatre with MTC	
2024	A Street Car Named Desire	Mitch	Melbourne Theatre Co	
2025	The Removalists	Sergeant Simmonds	Southbank Theatre MTC	
