= Young Hercules =

American/New Zealand television series

- Genre: Action-adventure; Heroic fantasy; Comedy drama
- Developed by: Robert Tapert; Sam Raimi
- Starring: Ryan Gosling; Dean O'Gorman; Chris Conrad
- Composer: Joseph LoDuca
- Country of origin: United States
- Original language: English
- No. of seasons: 1
- No. of episodes: 50 (+ pilot)

Production
- Executive producers: Sam Raimi; Robert Tapert; Eric Gruendemann; Liz Friedman
- Production location: New Zealand
- Running time: 20–21 minutes
- Production companies: Renaissance Pictures; Studios USA Television

Original release
- Network: Fox Kids Network
- Release: September 12, 1998 – May 14, 1999

Related
- Hercules: The Legendary Journeys; Xena: Warrior Princess; Hercules and Xena – The Animated Movie: The Battle for Mount Olympus

Young Hercules is a prequel series to the television series Hercules: The Legendary Journeys that originally aired on Fox Kids Network. After a pilot film aired on Feb. 17, 1998, the series premiered on September 12, 1998, and ended on May 14, 1999, with a total of 50 episodes over the course of one season. It stars Ryan Gosling in the title role, who took over from Ian Bohen who starred in the pilot movie and four episodes of Hercules: The Legendary Journeys. The series was inspired by the Greek myths of Heracles.

== Plot ==
"In an age of light and darkness, Zeus, king of the gods, ruled the universe. He had a son: Young Hercules. Half-god, Half-man, Young Hercules longs to find his place in the world, the father he's never known, and what it means to be a hero. Before the man became legend, before the legend became myth, came the greatest adventure of all!"

— opening narration.

The series follows Hercules as he attends the Academy, where the wise centaur headmaster, Cheiron, trains him in the ways of the warrior. There, he befriends Prince Jason, the future king of Corinth, and Iolaus, a former thief who was sentenced to train at the Academy instead of going to prison. Hercules also meets the Academy's first female cadet, Lilith.

The show features Ares, the god of war, and his attempts to destroy his younger half-brother to win Zeus' favor. Among his allies are his nephew Strife and the goddess of retribution, Discord. The series also features two other villains: Hera, the queen of the gods and Hercules' stepmother, and Apollo, the god of the sun and Hercules' half-brother.

Other characters of interest include Kora, the innkeeper who, unbeknownst to Hercules and his friends, is a devotee of Artemis, the goddess of the hunt. As the series progresses, it is revealed that Kora has special powers that allow her to do Artemis' bidding. There are hints of romance between Hercules and Kora, but their friendship keeps things innocent.

== Cast ==
=== Main ===
- Ian Bohen as Hercules (pilot only)
- Ryan Gosling as Hercules
- Dean O'Gorman as Iolaus
- Chris Conrad as Jason

=== Supporting ===
- Jodie Rimmer as Lilith
- Mfundo Morrison as Theseus
- Nathaniel Lees as Cheiron
- Angela Marie Dotchin as Kora
- Kevin Smith as Ares
- Joel Tobeck as Strife
- Meighan Desmond as Discord
- Katrina Browne as Cyane, an Amazon
- Jason Hoyte as Hephaestus, god of metallurgy
- Sharon Tyrell as Alcmene
- Alison Bruce as Simula
- Elizabeth Hawthorne as Hera
- Jay Ryan as Cadet
- John Bach as Zeus

== Production ==
Young Hercules' executive producers were Robert Tapert and Sam Raimi. Liz Friedman and Eric Gruendemann were co-executive producers, and former MTV producer Cynthia Hsiung was producer of the series. Eric Lewald and Julia Lewald were head writers. In New Zealand, where principal photography was shot, Janine Dickins held down the fort as the New Zealand producer while three series directors took turns shooting the episodes in blocks of four along with a fourth director for second unit. Chris Graves, Charlie Haskell and Andrew Merrifield shot principal photography and Simon Rabbi shot second unit. Later in the series, Simon Rabbi shot principal photography for the 50th episode, "Valley of the Shadow."

The series has been used in case studies of how to shoot television series efficiently. Traditional television series are shot one episode at a time. Young Hercules was shot in blocks of four episodes at a time. The three main directors of the series were on a rotation, one director for each four episode block. The four would be written with this in mind, keeping sets, locations, and actors similar in all four episodes even if story and plot lines might not interrelate. This saved tremendous amounts of money and time allowing the series to be shot on a shoestring budget, but with maximum on-screen dollars. The 50 episodes had a budget of roughly $20 million which includes above and below the line costs. Shooting in New Zealand also allowed the series to circumvent considerable Guild regulations for further savings. Additional money was saved shooting the series on 16 mm film. Early research was done to see if digital cameras could be used, but it was determined that technology was not adequate at the time to make digital filming economically viable.

Principal photography took place in New Zealand while post-production elements including visual effects and music were all edited and integrated together in Los Angeles. Ian Bohen played Young Hercules in the pilot movie and was offered the part, but opted not to move to New Zealand where the series would shoot principal photography. Early on in the series, special visual effects were conceived by Richard Taylor's Weta Workshop, the then little known visual effects company that went on to win several Academy Awards for their work on The Lord of the Rings. Weta and Richard Taylor stepped off Young Hercules early on to work on Lord of the Rings. In fact, the early production days of Young Hercules saw many of its crew leave to work on the then little known Peter Jackson sensation, Lord of the Rings.

Ryan Gosling was only 17 when he was cast in the lead role. To train for the role, Ryan took intense martial arts classes by the same trainer who taught Lucy Lawless and Kevin Sorbo. He was so tall and thin that his costume had to be reworked to minimize the look of how thin he was. Original costume sketches showed a darker upper body costume. When Gosling was cast, the costume designers made the upper body of his costume lighter in color and broader in the chest to help create a more bulky look. Makeup was used on Gosling's arms to help add muscle contours. Similar tricks were used for both Sorbo and Lawless for their characters.

The show's large supporting cast drew from actors who had appeared on either Hercules or Xena previously, often taking advantage of the show's mythological setting to appear as the same characters.

Like its parent series, the show was only superficially faithful to Greek mythology and Ancient Greece; it retold and re-used characters in often anachronistic ways, and sometimes used original characters to tell stories found in mythology.

=== Location ===
The series was filmed entirely in New Zealand, at Studio West in West Auckland.

== Episodes ==
The series was aired out of order. The episodes are listed below, as presented on DVD, in the order of their production codes. Despite this, the episodes list is not completely correct chronologically. For example, in "The Head That Wears the Crown" Jason is crowned king, yet in several following episodes, such as "Winner Take All", he is still a prince. Similarly, even though Lilith visits Hercules' mother in "Mommy Dearests", they later appear to meet for the first time in "Home for the Holidays".

No.	Title	Directed by	Written by	Original release date
1	"The Treasure of Zeus - Part 1"	Chris Graves	Story by : Rob Tapert & Liz Friedman; Teleplay by : Mark Edens	September 12, 1998
Hercules sets out to retrieve a chalice belonging to Hera, unaware it's all a trap set by Ares and Strife.
2	"Between Friends (The Treasure Of Zeus - Part 2)"	Chris Graves	Story by : Rob Tapert & Liz Friedman; Teleplay by : Michael Edens	September 16, 1998
Having failed to kill Hercules with the Phoenix that guards the chalice, Strife targets his friends by framing Iolaus for theft.
3	"What a Crockery (The Treasure Of Zeus - Part 3)"	Chris Graves	Story by : Rob Tapert & Liz Friedman; Teleplay by : Hilary J. Bader	September 17, 1998
Ares learns from Hera that by taking the chalice, Hercules has lost his father's protection.
4	"Herc and Seek"	Chris Graves	John Loy	September 22, 1998
Hercules must save Iolaus from his old gang after they break into the academy and take him hostage.
5	"Girl Trouble"	Charlie Haskell	Adam Armus & Nora Kay Foster	September 19, 1998
Herc and his friends travel to Athens to hire a new cook for the academy and try to help a tribe of Amazons escape an evil sea captain who has enslaved them.
6	"Teacher's Pests"	Charlie Haskell	Jim Fisher & Jim Staahl	September 26, 1998
When the boys are given detention under the strict Fiducious, Herc and Jason try to cover for Iolaus while he starts his new job at the inn.
7	"Inn Trouble"	Charlie Haskell	Len Uhley	October 1, 1998
Kora leaves Hercules and his friends in charge of her Inn, where Discord and Strife set a trap involving rowdy Satyrs and a sacred feast.
8	"Keeping Up with the Jasons"	Charlie Haskell	Brooks Wachtel	October 2, 1998
Feeling jealous of Jason's new sword and shield, Hercules goes to Hephaestus, who gives him special weapons. However, his new weapons go to his head.
9	"Amazon Grace"	Andrew Merrifield	Shari Goodhartz	February 4, 1999
Hercules is reunited with Cyane, the Amazon leader, and her tribe. Things get complicated when he tries to tell her his father is Zeus, who Cyane hates. The King of Athens tries to claim the Amazons as slaves.
10	"Cyrano de Hercules"	Andrew Merrifield	Jan Strnad	February 23, 1999
Feeling lonely, Hephaestus crafts the perfect woman, Galatea. However, when she falls for Hercules, Hephaestus makes her hate Hercules, to the point of wanting him dead.
11	"Battle Lines - Part 1"	Charlie Haskell	Steven Melching	November 11, 1998
Hercules and Iolaus become caught between loyalties when Cheiron and the Centaurs are in conflict with Cyane and her Amazons, not knowing it is all a plot by Discord and Strife.
12	"Battle Lines - Part 2"	Charlie Haskell	Doug Molitor & Eric Lewald	November 13, 1998
Hercules tries to avert war between the Centaurs and Amazons by finding the ones fanning the flames of anger.
13	"Forgery"	Andrew Merrifield	Michael Edens	October 10, 1998
Tired of being considered a wet blanket, Hercules uses Hephaestus' forge to change his heart and give him the "fire inside". But the fire soon burns out of control.
14	"No Way Out"	Andrew Merrifield	Jim Fisher & Jim Staahl	September 25, 1998
Lilith gets trapped in a cave with Hercules, while their friends plan a surprise birthday party for her.
15	"Ares on Trial"	Andrew Merrifield	Carter Crocker	September 29, 1998
Another attempt on Hercules's life lands Ares in hot water with his fellow gods, who put him on trial for his actions.
16	"Down and Out in Academy Hills"	Andrew Merrifield	Mark Edens	October 3, 1998
Hercules meets an amnesiac who literally fell from the sky and takes him to the academy, unaware he is actually related to him.
17	"Winner Take All"	Chris Graves	Michael Reaves	October 30, 1998
Hercules meets his two half-brothers, Castor and Pollux, but starts neglecting his friends.
18	"A Serpent's Tooth"	Chris Graves	Bob Forward	October 31, 1998
Iolaus bonds with a mysterious baby creature that was given as a gift to Jason, unaware it's a fire breathing basilisk that came from Strife and Discord.
19	"The Lure of the Lyre"	Chris Graves	Len Uhley	November 3, 1998
A new friend, the musician Orpheus, introduces Hercules to Bacchus, who tries to lure him and his friends into his evil cult of Bacchai.
20	"Fame"	Chris Graves	Paul Sauer	November 4, 1998
Hercules is reunited with Orpheus and Euridice who have become great musicians, though she doesn't know that Orpheus is using Bacchus' magic lyre to recruit more Bacchae.
21	"Lyre, Liar"	Charlie Haskell	Jim Fisher & Jim Staahl	September 18, 1998
Orpheus still possesses Bacchus' magic lyre, and Bacchus wants it and Euridice back.
22	"A Lady in Hades"	Charlie Haskell	John Loy	October 9, 1998
Hercules and Jason descend into Underworld to rescue Euridice, who died saving Hercules' life.
23	"The Mysteries of Life"	Charlie Haskell	Adam Armus & Nora Kay Foster	October 7, 1998
Iolaus tries to rescue Ruff, the basilisk he bonded with when it was a baby, from a cruel sideshow owner who captured him.
24	"Dad Always Liked Me Best"	Charlie Haskell	Mark Edens	September 24, 1998
Hercules meets another half-brother, Lucius, who's tracking Pollux for the murder of Castor. But things aren't quite as they appear...
25	"Herc's Nemesis"	Andrew Merrifield	Mark Edens	October 29, 1998
Hercules incurs the wrath of his stepmother, Hera, when he convinces Nemesis to defy Hera's orders.
26	"Cold Feet"	Andrew Merrifield	John Loy	November 5, 1998
Jason begins to feel doubt about his future role as king, until he meets a farmer and his daughter who are under threat from a marauder.
27	"Mommy Dearests"	Charlie Haskell	Michael Edens	February 5, 1999
Lucius returns, with an even more diabolic plan to kill Hercules.
28	"In Your Dreams"	Charlie Haskell	Adam Armus & Nora Kay Foster	March 2, 1999
Ares enlists the god of dreams in his latest scheme to get rid of Hercules by trapping him in a deadly nightmare.
29	"Sisters"	Andrew Merrifield	Michael Edens	October 24, 1998
Kora becomes jealous when her sister Cleo arrives and quickly becomes more popular than her, so she tries to emulate Cleo.
30	"The Golden Bow"	Andrew Merrifield	Liz Friedman & Vanessa Place	November 6, 1998
Kora enters an archery tournament in hopes of giving the prize to Artemis in exchange for her release from service.
31	"Home for the Holidays"	Chris Graves	Story by : Brooks Wachtel; Teleplay by : Hilary J. Bader	May 11, 1999
A trip home for a holiday brings a surprise to Hercules when he meets his mother's new boyfriend.
32	"Cram-Ped"	Charlie Haskell	Brian Herskowitz	November 12, 1998
Iolaus will be sent back to prison unless he can pass a test, so his friends help him study with an all night cramming session.
33	"Con Ares"	Andrew Merrifield	Michael Edens & Julia Lewald	May 10, 1999
Hercules and his friends meet a mortal farmer with an uncanny resemblance to Ares and hope to use him to avert a war between Sparta and Thebes.
34	"Get Jason"	Chris Graves	John Loy	November 20, 1998
An annual prank war at the academy covers an assassin's attempts on Jason's life.
35	"My Fair Lilith"	Andrew Merrifield	Len Uhley	February 1, 1999
In an attempt to get out of an arranged marriage, Jason begs Lilith to pretend to be his wife.
36	"Hind Sight"	Charlie Haskell	Jim Fisher & Jim Staahl	November 10, 1998
Hercules and Kora try to protect the Golden Hind, a mystical half-human half-deer that is sacred to Artemis, from hunters.
37	"The Head That Wears the Crown"	Andrew Merrifield	Jim Fisher & Jim Staahl	February 2, 1999
While Jason is being crowned king, Hercules wants to save his mother's midwife Galinthia from getting executed in Corinth.
38	"Me, Myself and Eye"	Chris Graves	Story by : Michael Edens; Teleplay by : Julia Lewald	February 25, 1999
Hercules comes into possession of an eye that can foretell the future, but the blind witches that own it curse his friends to get it back.
39	"The Skeptic"	Charlie Haskell	Vanessa Place	February 3, 1999
A new student at the Academy incurs the wrath of Strife by claiming not to believe in the gods.
40	"Iolaus Goes Stag"	Charlie Haskell	Patrick Phillips	February 17, 1999
Iolaus gets on the bad side of Artemis when he attempts to impress his uncle by going after the Golden Hind.
41	"Adventures in the Forbidden Zone"	Chris Graves	Mark Edens	November 19, 1998
Hercules and Theseus become rivals and they challenge each other to a chariot race, but they crash into the Forbidden Zone and have to fight for survival.
42	"The Prize"	Chris Graves	John Loy	November 18, 1998
A talent contest at Kora's inn draws an unusual contestant, Ares, who wants the first prize, the last fragment of the Chronos Stone which will make him stronger than Zeus and can only be given to him freely.
43	"The Beasts Beneath"	Chris Graves	Hilary J. Bader	November 24, 1998
Hercules and Theseus try to track down their friends, who have gotten lost in a desert full of quicksand and monsters.
44	"Parents' Day"	Andrew Merrifield	Jessica Scott & Mike Wollaeger	February 26, 1999
Iolaus hires actors to play his parents at the academy's parents day, unaware they're actually thieves.
45	"A Life for a Life"	Chris Graves	Mark Edens	February 22, 1999
Ares kidnaps Chiron and leaves clues for Hercules and his friends to follow, believing Hercules will willingly sacrifice his life to save Chiron.
46	"Under Siege"	Chris Graves	John Loy	February 24, 1999
Ares controls Cyane to attack the academy and tricks Hephaestus to make new weapons for the job.
47	"Mila"	Andrew Merrifield	Jim Fisher & Jim Staahl	March 8, 1999
Hercules meets Mila, an Amazon warrior searching for her father, unaware that Ares has a plan to use her.
48	"Apollo"	Andrew Merrifield	Clark Carlton & John Loy	May 12, 1999
Hercules meets his half-brother Apollo, and incurs his wrath after becoming more popular with his followers.
49	"Ill Wind"	Simon Raby	Jim Fisher & Jim Staahl	May 13, 1999
Cyane becomes sick and tries to communicate with Hercules how to cure her by sharing memories with him.
50	"Valley of the Shadow"	Simon Raby	Story by : Mark Edens; Teleplay by : Vanessa Place	May 14, 1999
Hercules, Iolaus, and Theseus go hunting and an old man advises them to try out a valley that turns out to have a monster.

== Reception ==
The series aired on the Fox Kids Network at first on Monday through Friday at 4:30 p.m. PST and Saturday mornings at 8:30 a.m. PST. Later in the year, the series aired Monday through Friday only at 3:30 p.m. PST. Although ratings on Fox Kids were strong for the season (2nd top-rated live-action series below Power Rangers), Young Hercules was not renewed.

=== Daytime Emmy Award ===
Year	Recipient	Category	Result
1999	George Haddad (post sound supervisor); Tim Isle (music editor)	Outstanding sound editing	Nominated

=== Writers Guild of America Award ===
Year	Recipient	Category	Result
2000	Shari Goodhartz (writer; for episode 36: Hind Sight)	Outstanding children's script	Nominated

== Home media ==
On June 23, 2015, Shout! Factory released Young Hercules: The Complete Series on DVD in Region 1 for the very first time.

== See also ==
- List of films featuring Hercules
