= Cherish Alexander Bailey =

American singer, songwriter and musician

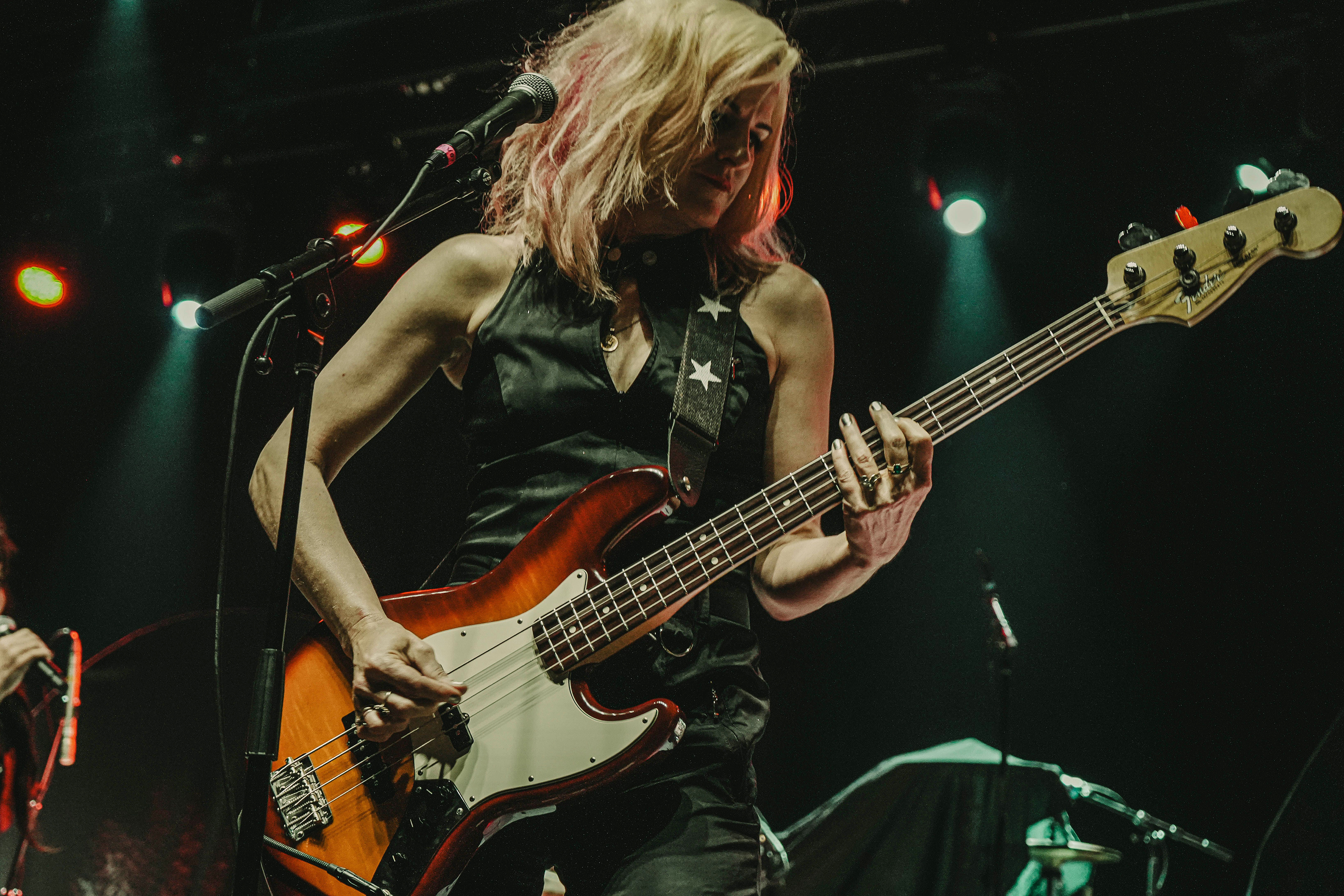
- Cherish Alexander in 2024

Background information
- Born: Dallas, Texas
- Genres: Pop, rock, folk, country
- Occupations: Singer, songwriter & musician
- Years active: 1982–present
- Website: cherishalexander.com

Cherish Alexander Bailey is an American singer, songwriter and musician.

== Career ==
Bailey was born in Dallas, Texas. In 1982, she was Doug Henning's assistant on the NBC special Doug Henning's World of Magic with Bruce Jenner, Billy Crystal and Ann Jillian. She was managed by Iris Burton and was featured in an international Coca-Cola commercial.

In 1990, Bailey was signed to RCA Records and Warner Chappell Publishing to release two albums. While at Warner Chappell Publishing, she wrote and published songs with Billy Steinberg, Gregg Alexander, John Shanks, Martin Page and Desmond Child.

In 1992, Bailey collaborated with Tommy Page to write the top 10 hit song in Hong Kong With All My Heart for musical artist Sally Yeh.

In 1996, Bailey played lead guitar for Cyndi Lauper for her songs You Don’t Know and Sisters of Avalon for her album SISTERS OF AVALON. Also in 1996, You Don’t Belong Down Here Song Written by Cherish Alexander and Alan Roy Scott performed by Tiffany (benefit album).

In 2000, Bailey's song Goodbye was the title song for the TV series The Crow-Stairway heaven. In 2010, she released the song Need to Know (the Disclosure Song) which in 2021 became the theme song for the worldwide podcast Need to know with hosts Bryce Zabel and Ross Coulthart.

From 2018 to recent, Bailey tours and plays bass for the 80's icon Josie Cotton playing the Microsoft Theatre in DTLA and the Greek Theatre along with other 80's acts Violent Femmes, A Flock of Seagulls, Missing Persons and MC Hammer.

== Recognition ==
In 2021, Bailey was recognized for her song and video, Change Can Start With Me which won Honorable mention at the Cannes World Film Festival.
