= Dwayne Cameron =

New Zealand actor (born 1981)

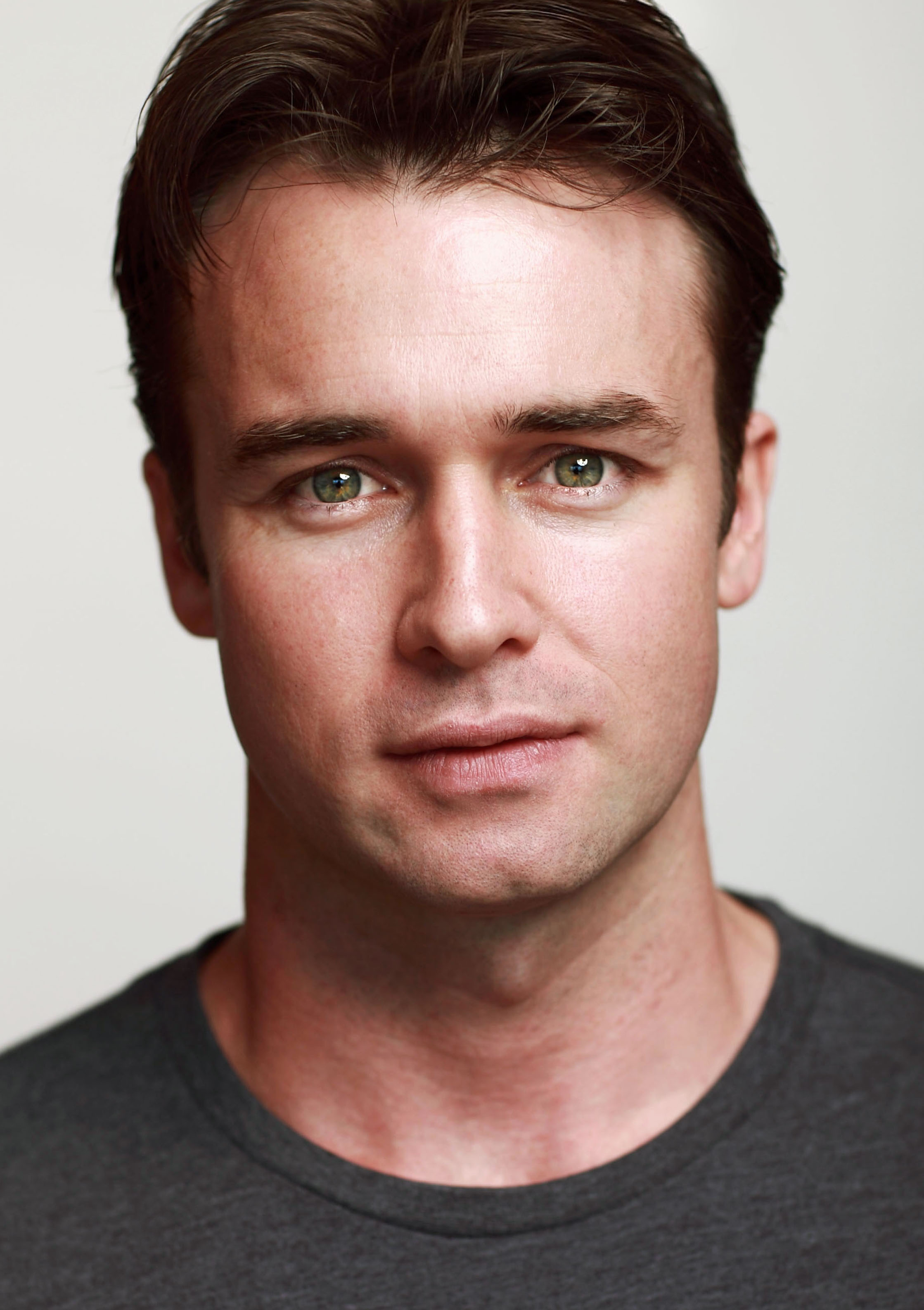
- Cameron in 2011
- Born: 28 October 1981 (age 44); Auckland, New Zealand
- Occupations: Film and television actor and artist
- Years active: 1997–present
- Website: https://www.dwaynecameron.com

Dwayne Cameron (born 28 October 1981) is a New Zealand actor, writer, director and producer. Cameron played the lead role of Bray on the teen drama series The Tribe and Tyzonn in Power Rangers Operation Overdrive.

== Biography ==
Cameron was born in Auckland, New Zealand. He began acting professionally at 12. He first debut role was in the American television movie Amazon High where Cameron played the boyfriend of Selma Blair. Two years later, he guest starred alongside William Shatner in A Twist in the Tale. The series was produced in Wellington by Cloud Nine. He then was cast for The Tribe which was produced by the same company.

He was on the show for the first three series. During his time on The Tribe, he went on several tours to Europe to promote the show and the spin-off album for the series, Abe Messiah.

After The Tribe, Cameron made guest appearances in numerous television dramas including Love Bites and Dark Knight. He also had lead roles in Street Legal and the award-winning Mercy Peak during the next two years. He also had starring roles in The Possum Hunter (2000), The Locals (2003) and Cockle (2005).

In 2004, he moved to Los Angeles where he trained at the Stella Adler Academy and the Ivana Chubbuck Acting Studio. Cameron appeared in the 2007 short film No Destination. He returned to New Zealand where he starred in Power Rangers Operation Overdrive, Shortland Street, The Cult, and Legend Of The Seeker.

In 2011, he starred as the lead role of Detective Joshua King in the New Zealand feature film Desired. In 2012, he starred in the short film A Dream, a short film that is based on Franz Kafka's The Trial. He also played the lead role in Holding the Sun, a short film based on the works of C.G. Jung and Joseph Campbell, that he wrote, directed, produced and edited. Holding the Sun was nominated for Best Short Film and Best Production Design at the 2013 New Zealand Film Awards and was selected into the Cannes Film Festival in the Short Film Corner the same year.

== Filmography ==
=== Film ===
- One of Them (1998) as Rusty
- The Locals (2003) as Paul
- Cockle (2005, Short) as Cockle
- No Destination (2006, Short) as Troy
- The Puzzle (2010, Short) as Josh
- Vindaloo Empire aka Curry Munchers (2011) as Connor
- Desired (2011) as Detective Joshua King
- A Dream (2012, Short) as Accused
- The Last Stop (2012, Short) as Station Master
- Pleroma (2013, Short) as Abraxas 'Mach' Machelvie
- Holding the Sun (2013, Short) as Matthew Archview
- Broken Hallelujah (2014) as TV Assistant
- Nice Package (2016) as Frostie
- McLaren (2017, Documentary) as Bruce McLaren
- 211 (2018) as Steve MacAvoy
- Disturbing the Peace (2020) as Diesel
- June (2021, Short) as David

=== TV work ===
- Amazon High (1997, TV Movie) as Leon
- A Twist in the Tale (1999) as Chris
- The Tribe (1999–2002) as Bray
- Possum Hunter (2000, TV Movie) as Rob
- Dark Knight (2002) as Mordred
- Love Bites (2002) as Barman John
- Mercy Peak (2002–2003) as Gus Van der Velter
- Street Legal (2002–2003) as James Peabody
- Power Rangers Dino Thunder (2004) as Derrick
- Power Rangers S.P.D. (2005) as Dru Harrington / Giganis
- Power Rangers Operation Overdrive (2007) as Tyzonn / Mercury Ranger
- Shortland Street (2008) as Lindsay Reynolds
- Legend of the Seeker (2009) as Kur
- The Cult (2009) as Nathan Lewis
- Emilie Richards (2011) as Schwarzhaariger Brandstifter
- Cancerman: The Milan Brych Affair (2012, TV Movie documentary) as Dr. Garth Cooper
- Strongman: The Tragedy (2012, Documentary) as Peter Crawford
- Mr & Mrs Murder (2013) as Ryan Coltrane
- Agent Anna (2014) as Rory O'Conner
- American Playboy: The Hugh Hefner Story (2017) as Counsellor Summerfield
