= List of Xena: Warrior Princess episodes =

Xena: Warrior Princess complete collection on DVD.

Xena: Warrior Princess is an American television series that was created by Robert Tapert and John Schulian. Xena is a historical fantasy set primarily in ancient Greece, although it has a flexible time setting and occasionally features Oriental, Egyptian and Medieval elements. The flexible fantasy framework of the show accommodates a considerable range of theatrical styles, from high melodrama to slapstick comedy, from whimsical and musical to all-out action and adventure. While the show is typically set in ancient times, its themes are essentially modern and it investigates the ideas of taking responsibility for past misdeeds, the value of human life, personal liberty and sacrifice, and friendship. The show often addresses ethical dilemmas, such as the morality of pacifism; however, the storylines rarely seek to provide unequivocal solutions.

The character of Xena debuted on March 13, 1995, on the TV series Hercules: The Legendary Journeys. Three episodes featuring Xena, collectively called The Xena Trilogy, initially aired as part of the first season of Hercules: The Legendary Journeys. Xena's own series began on September 4, 1995. The series ran for six seasons and 134 episodes until its final episode aired on June 23, 2001. The series won an Emmy Award in 2001, and was ranked in #10 in TV Guide's Top 25 Cult TV Shows of All Time.

== Series overview ==
Season	Episodes	Originally released	
Season	Episodes	First released	Last released
Intro	3	March 13, 1995	May 8, 1995
1	24	September 4, 1995	July 29, 1996
2	22	October 12, 1996	May 10, 1997
3	22	September 27, 1997	May 16, 1998
4	22	October 3, 1998	May 22, 1999
5	22	October 2, 1999	May 20, 2000
6	22	October 7, 2000	June 18, 2001

== Episodes ==
=== Introductory episodes (1995) ===
The program and its namesake character are introduced during the first season of Hercules: The Legendary Journeys. The Hercules: The Legendary Journeys episodes, "The Warrior Princess", "The Gauntlet" and "Unchained Heart", served as pilot episodes for the show. A director's cut of the episodes were later released as a separate VHS set and DVD as Hercules: The Xena Trilogy

No. overall	No. in season	Title	Directed by	Written by	Original release date	Prod. code
9	9	"The Warrior Princess"	Bruce Seth Green	John Schulian	March 13, 1995	76608
Iolaus is seduced by the cunning and cruel Xena, Warrior Princess, who aims to use him to destroy Hercules, leaving her free to take over the world…
12	12	"The Gauntlet"	Jack Perez	Peter Bielak	May 1, 1995	76612
Xena is betrayed by her lieutenant, Darphus, and forced to walk "the gauntlet". Determined to get her revenge, she forms an alliance with Hercules, who tries to make her see that there is more to life than vengeance and evil.
13	13	"Unchained Heart"	Bruce Seth Green	John Schulian	May 8, 1995	76613
Hercules, Salmoneus and Iolaus team up to fight Darphus, who has risen from the grave and plans to feed Hercules to Ares' dog of war Graegus. In the end, Ares loses his most valuable pawn as Xena turns her back on evil once and for all.

=== Season 1 (1995–96) ===
No. overall	No. in season	Title	Directed by	Written by	Original release date
1	1	"Sins of the Past"	Doug Lefler	Story by : Robert Tapert; Teleplay by : R.J. Stewart	September 4, 1995
2	2	"Chariots of War"	Harley Cokeliss	Story by : Josh Becker & Jack Perez; Teleplay by : Adam Armus & Nora Kay Foster	September 11, 1995
3	3	"Dreamworker"	Bruce Seth Green	Steven L. Sears	September 18, 1995
4	4	"Cradle of Hope"	Michael Levine	Terence Winter	September 25, 1995
5	5	"The Path Not Taken"	Stephen L. Posey	Julie Sherman	October 2, 1995
6	6	"The Reckoning"	Charles Siebert	Peter Allan Fields	October 16, 1995
7	7	"The Titans"	Eric Brevig	R.J. Stewart	October 30, 1995
8	8	"Prometheus"	Stephen L. Posey	R.J. Stewart	November 6, 1995
9	9	"Death in Chains"	Charles Siebert	Story by : Babs Greyhosky & Adam Armus & Nora Kay Foster; Teleplay by : Adam Armus & Nora Kay Foster	November 13, 1995
10	10	"Hooves and Harlots"	Jace Alexander	Steven L. Sears	November 20, 1995
11	11	"The Black Wolf"	Mario Di Leo	Alan Jay Glueckman	January 8, 1996
12	12	"Beware Greeks Bearing Gifts"	T.J. Scott	Story by : Roy Thomas & Janis Hendler; Teleplay by : Adam Armus & Nora Kay Foster	January 15, 1996
13	13	"Athens City Academy of the Performing Bards"	Jace Alexander	R.J. Stewart & Steven L. Sears	January 22, 1996
14	14	"A Fistful of Dinars"	Josh Becker	Steven L. Sears & R.J. Stewart	January 29, 1996
15	15	"Warrior... Princess"	Michael Levine	Brenda Lilly	February 5, 1996
16	16	"Mortal Beloved"	Garth Maxwell	R.J. Stewart	February 12, 1996
17	17	"The Royal Couple of Thieves"	John Cameron	Steven L. Sears	February 19, 1996
18	18	"The Prodigal"	John T. Kretchmer	Chris Manheim	March 4, 1996
19	19	"Altared States"	Michael Levine	Chris Manheim	April 22, 1996
20	20	"Ties That Bind"	Charles Siebert	Adam Armus & Nora Kay Foster	April 29, 1996
21	21	"The Greater Good"	Gary Jones	Steven L. Sears	May 6, 1996
22	22	"Callisto"	T. J. Scott	R.J. Stewart	May 13, 1996
23	23	"Death Mask"	Stewart Main	Peter Allan Fields	June 3, 1996
24	24	"Is There a Doctor in the House?"	T.J. Scott	Patricia Manney	July 29, 1996

=== Season 2 (1996–97) ===
No. overall	No. in season	Title	Directed by	Written by	Original release date	Prod. code
25	1	"Orphan of War"	Charles Siebert	Steven L. Sears	September 30, 1996	V0206
26	2	"Remember Nothing"	Anson Williams	Story by : Steven L. Sears & Chris Manheim; Teleplay by : Steven L. Sears	October 7, 1996	V0201
27	3	"The Giant Killer"	Gary Jones	Terence Winter	October 14, 1996	V0204
28	4	"Girls Just Wanna Have Fun"	T. J. Scott	Nora Kay Foster & Adam Armus	October 28, 1996	V0202
29	5	"Return of Callisto"	T.J. Scott	R. J. Stewart	November 4, 1996	V0210
30	6	"Warrior... Princess... Tramp"	Josh Becker	R. J. Stewart	November 11, 1996	V0205
31	7	"Intimate Stranger"	Gary Jones	Steven L. Sears	November 18, 1996	V0211
32	8	"Ten Little Warlords"	Charles Siebert	Paul Robert Coyle	November 25, 1996	V0215
33	9	"A Solstice Carol"	John T. Kretchmer	Chris Manheim	December 9, 1996	V0209
34	10	"The Xena Scrolls"	Charlie Haskell	Story by : Robert Sidney Mellette; Teleplay by : Nora Kay Foster & Adam Armus	January 13, 1997	V0208
35	11	"Here She Comes... Miss Amphipolis"	Marina Sargenti	Chris Manheim	January 20, 1997	V0212
36	12	"Destiny"	Robert Tapert	Story by : Robert Tapert; Teleplay by : R.J. Stewart & Steven L. Sears	January 27, 1997	V0207
37	13	"The Quest"	Michael Levine	Story by : Steven L. Sears & R.J. Stewart & Chris Manheim; Teleplay by : Steven L. Sears	February 3, 1997	V0221
38	14	"A Necessary Evil"	Mark Beesley	Paul Robert Coyle	February 10, 1997	V0219
39	15	"A Day in the Life"	Michael Hurst	R.J. Stewart	February 17, 1997	V0223
40	16	"For Him the Bell Tolls"	Josh Becker	Adam Armus & Nora Kay Foster	February 24, 1997	V0220
41	17	"The Execution"	Garth Maxwell	Paul Robert Coyle	April 7, 1997	V0218
42	18	"Blind Faith"	Josh Becker	Nora Kay Foster & Adam Armus	April 14, 1997	V0214
43	19	"Ulysses"	Michael Levine	R.J. Stewart	April 28, 1997	V0213
44	20	"The Price"	Oley Sassone	Steven L. Sears	May 5, 1997	V0217
45	21	"Lost Mariner"	Garth Maxwell	Steven L. Sears	May 12, 1997	V0226
46	22	"A Comedy of Eros"	Charles Siebert	Chris Manheim	May 19, 1997	V0225

=== Season 3 (1997–98) ===
No. overall	No. in season	Title	Directed by	Written by	Original release date	Prod. code
47	1	"The Furies"	Gilbert Shilton	R.J. Stewart	September 29, 1997	V0224
48	2	"Been There, Done That"	Andrew Merrifield	Hilary J. Bader	October 6, 1997	V0227
49	3	"The Dirty Half Dozen"	Rick Jacobson	Steven L. Sears	October 13, 1997	V0411
50	4	"The Deliverer"	Oley Sassone	Steven L. Sears	October 20, 1997	V0401
51	5	"Gabrielle's Hope"	Andrew Merrifield & Charles Siebert	R.J. Stewart	October 20, 1997	V0402
52	6	"The Debt"	Oley Sassone	Story by : Robert Tapert & R.J. Stewart; Teleplay by : R.J. Stewart	November 3, 1997	V0406
53	7	"The Debt II"	Oley Sassone	Story by : Robert Tapert & R.J. Stewart; Teleplay by : R.J. Stewart	November 10, 1997	V0407
54	8	"The King of Assassins"	Bruce Campbell	Adam Armus & Nora Kay Foster	November 17, 1997	V0410
55	9	"Warrior... Priestess... Tramp"	Robert Ginty	Adam Armus & Nora Kay Foster	January 12, 1998	V0404
56	10	"The Quill is Mightier..."	Andrew Merrifield	Hilary J. Bader	January 19, 1998	V0408
57	11	"Maternal Instincts"	Mark Beesley	Chris Manheim	February 7, 1998	V0405
58	12	"The Bitter Suite"	Oley Sassone	Steven L. Sears & Chris Manheim	February 14, 1998	V0409
59	13	"One Against an Army"	Paul Lynch	Gene O'Neill & Noreen Tobin	February 21, 1998	V0413
60	14	"Forgiven"	Garth Maxwell	R.J. Stewart	February 28, 1998	V0415
61	15	"King Con"	Janet Greek	Chris Manheim	March 7, 1998	V0403
62	16	"When in Rome..."	John Laing	Steven L. Sears	March 14, 1998	V0416
63	17	"Forget Me Not"	Charlie Haskell	Hilary J. Bader	March 21, 1998	V0417
64	18	"Fins, Femmes & Gems"	Josh Becker	Story by : Robert Tapert and Adam Armus & Nora Kay Foster; Teleplay by : Adam Armus & Nora Kay Foster	April 25, 1998	V0418
65	19	"Tsunami"	John Laing	Chris Manheim	May 2, 1998	V0414
66	20	"Vanishing Act"	Andrew Merrifield	Terry Winter	May 9, 1998	V0421
67	21	"Sacrifice"	David Warry-Smith	Steven L. Sears	May 16, 1998	V0420
68	22	"Sacrifice II"	Rick Jacobson	Paul Robert Coyle	May 23, 1998	V0419

=== Season 4 (1998–99) ===
No. overall	No. in season	Title	Directed by	Written by	Original release date
69	1	"Adventures in the Sin Trade"	T. J. Scott	Story by : R.J. Stewart & Robert Tapert; Teleplay by : R.J. Stewart	September 28, 1998
70	2	"Adventures in the Sin Trade II"	T. J. Scott	Story by : R.J. Stewart & Robert Tapert; Teleplay by : R.J. Stewart	October 5, 1998
71	3	"A Family Affair"	Doug Lefler	Story by : Liz Friedman & Chris Manheim; Teleplay by : Chris Manheim	October 17, 1998
72	4	"In Sickness and in Hell"	Josh Becker	Adam Armus & Nora Kay Foster	October 24, 1998
73	5	"A Good Day"	Rick Jacobson	Steven L. Sears	October 26, 1998
74	6	"A Tale of Two Muses"	Michael Hurst	Gillian Horvath	November 2, 1998
75	7	"Locked Up and Tied Down"	Rick Jacobson	Story by : Robert Tapert & Josh Becker; Teleplay by : Hilary Bader	November 9, 1998
76	8	"Crusader"	Paul Lynch	R.J. Stewart	November 16, 1998
77	9	"Past Imperfect"	Garth Maxwell	Steven L. Sears	January 4, 1999
78	10	"The Key to the Kingdom"	Bruce Campbell	Eric A. Morris	January 11, 1999
79	11	"Daughter of Pomira"	Patrick Norris	Linda McGibney	January 18, 1999
80	12	"If the Shoe Fits..."	Josh Becker	Adam Armus & Nora Kay Foster	January 25, 1999
81	13	"Paradise Found"	Robert Tapert	Chris Manheim	February 1, 1999
82	14	"Devi"	Garth Maxwell	Chris Manheim	February 8, 1999
83	15	"Between the Lines"	Rick Jacobson	Steven L. Sears	February 15, 1999
84	16	"The Way"	John Fawcett	R.J. Stewart	February 22, 1999
85	17	"The Play's the Thing"	Christopher Graves	Ashley Gable & Thomas A. Swyden	March 1, 1999
86	18	"The Convert"	Andrew Merrifield	Chris Manheim	April 19, 1999
87	19	"Takes One to Know One"	Christopher Graves	Jeff Vlaming	April 26, 1999
88	20	"Endgame"	Garth Maxwell	Steven L. Sears	May 3, 1999
89	21	"The Ides of March"	Ken Girotti	R.J. Stewart	May 10, 1999
90	22	"Déjà Vu All over Again"	Renee O'Connor	R.J. Stewart	May 17, 1999

=== Season 5 (1999–2000) ===
No. overall	No. in season	Title	Directed by	Written by	Original release date	Prod. code
91	1	"Fallen Angel"	John Fawcett	Story by : Robert Tapert & R.J. Stewart; Teleplay by : R.J. Stewart	September 27, 1999	V0903
92	2	"Chakram"	Doug Lefler	Chris Manheim	October 4, 1999	V0901
93	3	"Succession"	Rick Jacobson	Steven L. Sears	October 11, 1999	V0902
94	4	"Animal Attraction"	Rick Jacobson	Chris Manheim	October 18, 1999	V0905
95	5	"Them Bones, Them Bones"	John Fawcett	Buddy Williers (aka Steven L. Sears)	November 1, 1999	V0908
96	6	"Purity"	Mark Beesley	Jeff Vlaming	November 8, 1999	V0907
97	7	"Back in the Bottle"	Rick Jacobson	Story by : Robert Tapert & Steven L. Sears; Teleplay by : Steven L. Sears	November 15, 1999	V0909
98	8	"Little Problems"	Allison Liddi	Gregg Ostrin	November 22, 1999	V0913
99	9	"Seeds of Faith"	Garth Maxwell	George Strayton & Tom O'Neill	January 10, 2000	V0912
100	10	"Lyre, Lyre, Hearts on Fire"	Mark Beesley	Adam Armus & Nora Kay Foster	January 17, 2000	V0911
101	11	"Punch Lines"	Andrew Merrifield	Chris Manheim	January 24, 2000	V0910
102	12	"God Fearing Child"	Phil Sgriccia	Story by : Chris Manheim; Teleplay by : Roberto Orci & Alex Kurtzman	February 7, 2000	V0915
103	13	"Eternal Bonds"	Mark Beesley	Chris Manheim	February 14, 2000	V0916
104	14	"Amphipolis Under Siege"	Mark Beesley	Chris Black	February 21, 2000	V0919
105	15	"Married with Fishsticks"	Paul Grinder	Kevin Maynard	February 28, 2000	V0914
106	16	"Lifeblood"	Michael Hurst	Story by : Rob Tapert & R.J. Stewart; Teleplay by : R.J. Stewart and George Strayton & Tom O'Neill	March 13, 2000	V0924
107	17	"Kindred Spirits"	Josh Becker	George Strayton & Tom O'Neill	April 17, 2000	V0918
108	18	"Antony & Cleopatra"	Michael Hurst	Carl Ellsworth	April 24, 2000	V0904
109	19	"Looking Death in the Eye"	Garth Maxwell	Carl Ellsworth	May 1, 2000	V0920
110	20	"Livia"	Rick Jacobson	Chris Manheim	May 8, 2000	V0921
111	21	"Eve"	Mark Beesley	George Strayton & Tom O'Neill	May 15, 2000	V0922
112	22	"Motherhood"	Rick Jacobson	Story by : Robert Tapert; Teleplay by : R.J. Stewart	May 22, 2000	V0923

=== Season 6 (2000–01) ===
No. overall	No. in season	Title	Directed by	Written by	Original release date	Prod. code
113	1	"Coming Home"	Mark Beesley	Melissa Good	October 2, 2000	V1411
114	2	"The Haunting of Amphipolis"	Garth Maxwell	Story by : Edithe Swensen & Joel Metzger; Teleplay by : Joel Metzger	October 9, 2000	V1401
115	3	"Heart of Darkness"	Mark Beesley	Emily Skopov	October 16, 2000	V1402
116	4	"Who's Gurkhan?"	Michael Hurst	Story by : Robert Tapert; Teleplay by : R.J. Stewart	October 23, 2000	V1404
117	5	"Legacy"	Chris Martin-Jones	Melissa Good	October 30, 2000	V1405
118	6	"The Abyss"	Rick Jacobson	James Kahn	November 6, 2000	V1406
119	7	"The Rheingold"	John Fawcett	R.J. Stewart	November 13, 2000	V1408
120	8	"The Ring"	Rick Jacobson	Joel Metzger	November 20, 2000	V1409
121	9	"Return of the Valkyrie"	John Fawcett	Emily Skopov	November 27, 2000	V1410
122	10	"Old Ares Had a Farm"	Charles Siebert	R.J. Stewart	January 15, 2001	V1414
123	11	"Dangerous Prey"	Renee O'Connor	Joel Metzger	January 22, 2001	N/A
124	12	"The God You Know"	Garth Maxwell	Emily Skopov	January 29, 2001	N/A
125	13	"You Are There"	John Laing	Chris Black	February 5, 2001	N/A
126	14	"Path of Vengeance"	Chris Martin-Jones	Joel Metzger	February 12, 2001	N/A
127	15	"To Helicon and Back"	Michael Hurst	Liz Friedman & Vanessa Place	February 23, 2001	V1419
128	16	"Send in the Clones"	Charlie Haskell	Paul Robert Coyle	March 4, 2001	N/A
129	17	"Last of the Centaurs"	Garth Maxwell	Joel Metzger	April 30, 2001	N/A
130	18	"When Fates Collide"	John Fawcett	Katherine Fugate	May 11, 2001	N/A
131	19	"Many Happy Returns"	Mark Beesley	Liz Friedman & Vanessa Place	May 14, 2001	V1426
132	20	"Soul Possession"	Josh Becker	Melissa Blake	June 4, 2001	N/A
133	21	"A Friend in Need Part 1"	Robert Tapert	Robert Tapert, R. J. Stewart	June 11, 2001	N/A
134	22	"A Friend in Need Part 2"	Robert Tapert	Robert Tapert, R. J. Stewart	June 18, 2001	N/A

== Home media release ==
Season	Episodes	DVD release date		
Season	Episodes	Region 1	Region 2	Region 4
1	24	April 23, 2003; April 20, 2010 (re-release)	June 6, 2005	June 23, 2005 (NZ); October 12, 2005 (Aus)
2	22	September 2, 2003; March 29, 2011 (re-release)	August 1, 2005	August 24, 2005 (NZ); October 12, 2005 (Aus)
3	22	February 10, 2004; March 12, 2012 (re-release)	October 3, 2005	September 22, 2005 (NZ); December 10, 2005 (Aus)
4	22	June 15, 2004; March 12, 2013 (re-release)	November 21, 2005	November 17, 2005 (NZ); December 10, 2005 (Aus)
5	22	October 19, 2004; July 22, 2014 (re-release)	—N/a	December 10, 2005 (Aus)
6	22	March 8, 2005; May 17, 2016 (re-release)	April 3, 2006	December 10, 2005 (Aus)
