= Xena: Warrior Princess season 4 =

Xena: Warrior Princess
- Season 4
- DVD cover
- No. of episodes: 22

Release
- Original network: Broadcast syndication
- Original release: September 28, 1998 – May 17, 1999

Season chronology
- ← Previous; Season 3 Next → Season 5

The fourth season of the television series Xena: Warrior Princess commenced airing in the United States and Canada on September 28, 1998 and concluded on May 17, 1999, after 22 episodes.

The fourth season aired in the United States in broadcast syndication. The season was released on DVD as a ten disc boxed set under the title of Xena: Warrior Princess: Season 4 on June 15, 2004 by Anchor Bay Entertainment.

"The Way" was withdrawn from broadcast prior to its airing. In response to this decision, a fan petition was circulated online and the episode was aired.

== Episodes ==
No. overall	No. in season	Title	Directed by	Written by	Original release date
69	1	"Adventures in the Sin Trade"	T. J. Scott	Story by : R.J. Stewart & Robert Tapert; Teleplay by : R.J. Stewart	September 28, 1998
After Gabrielle's death, Xena goes to Hades looking for her. He tells her she is in the Amazon Land of the Dead. While there, Xena discovers an old ally, Alti, has enslaved the souls of an Amazon tribe. Xena stops to teach the Amazons how to fight back against Alti.
70	2	"Adventures in the Sin Trade II"	T. J. Scott	Story by : R.J. Stewart & Robert Tapert; Teleplay by : R.J. Stewart	October 5, 1998
As Xena prepares the Amazons to fight back, she remembers her alliance with Alti and her betrayal. Meanwhile, Alti plagues Xena with disturbing visions of her and Gabrielle being crucified.
71	3	"A Family Affair"	Doug Lefler	Story by : Liz Friedman & Chris Manheim; Teleplay by : Chris Manheim	October 17, 1998
Xena and Joxer reunite with Gabrielle in Poteidaia, but Hope is posing in her place and has taken the family hostage. Meanwhile, she raises her child, "The Destroyer". Xena and Gabrielle trick the beast and the wounded creature, mistaking Hope for Gabrielle, kills her.
72	4	"In Sickness and in Hell"	Josh Becker	Adam Armus & Nora Kay Foster	October 24, 1998
Xena, Gabrielle and Joxer have to stop the Scythian army from attacking some villages. Xena and Gabrielle are struck down with lice and moldy feet. Joxer saves the day by giving the army food poisoning.
73	5	"A Good Day"	Rick Jacobson	Steven L. Sears	October 26, 1998
When Caesar and Pompey bring their war to Greece, Xena joins up with a Greek mercenary and the country people in order to trick the Romans into battling each other, thus leaving Greece reasonably unharmed.
74	6	"A Tale of Two Muses"	Michael Hurst	Gillian Horvath	November 2, 1998
In a town where dancing is banned, Xena and Gabrielle find Tara about to be whipped for breaking the law. While there Gabrielle withstands the urge to dance, while Xena gets Autolycus to help bring dance back to the town.
75	7	"Locked Up and Tied Down"	Rick Jacobson	Story by : Robert Tapert & Josh Becker; Teleplay by : Hilary Bader	November 9, 1998
Xena is arrested for an old murder and sentenced to spend the rest of her life at Shark Island Prison. Xena believes her time prison will help atone for her past, but with Gabrielle's help they discover that the victim survived and is now the prison warder.
76	8	"Crusader"	Paul Lynch	R.J. Stewart	November 16, 1998
Xena and Gabrielle meet Najara, a woman who fights evil and converts people to "turn to the light". Xena tries to leave Gabrielle with her, fearing the visions that Alti showed her. Xena later discovers that Najara kills anyone who refuses to convert to her way.
77	9	"Past Imperfect"	Garth Maxwell	Steven L. Sears	January 4, 1999
While Xena tries to protect Gabrielle from the events that occurred in her vision, she is confronted by her past and learns that an opposing army's leader is the woman who helped her give birth and also killed Borias years earlier.
78	10	"The Key to the Kingdom"	Bruce Campbell	Eric A. Morris	January 11, 1999
Joxer, Autolycus and Meg team up to steal Athena's Crown, and a baby holds the key to its location, but a prophecy says if the key is used the baby will be no more.
79	11	"Daughter of Pomira"	Patrick Norris	Linda McGibney	January 18, 1999
Many years ago, Vanessa was kidnapped by The Horde, now Xena goes off to rescue her. Once returned to her family, they discover that she was not being held as a slave, but had been adopted by the leader of The Horde. She reveals that she regard herself as Pomira, the Horde's real name, and not Greek. Through her Xena and the others learn that the Pomira are not savages.
80	12	"If the Shoe Fits..."	Josh Becker	Adam Armus & Nora Kay Foster	January 25, 1999
Princess Alesia has run away from home because she does not like her new stepmother. Xena, Joxer, Gabrielle and Aphrodite try to persuade her to return by telling her their own versions of Cinderella. Meanwhile, Aphrodite wants the girl to be the new Demigoddess of Puppy Love.
81	13	"Paradise Found"	Robert Tapert	Chris Manheim	February 1, 1999
Gabrielle and Xena have an accident and find themselves in a hidden paradise. The guru there begins instructing Gabrielle about inner peace and healing her pain. Xena becomes more and more agitated and violent, while Gabrielle slowly begins turning into stone.
82	14	"Devi"	Garth Maxwell	Chris Manheim	February 8, 1999
In India, Gabrielle and Xena meet Eli, and Gabrielle is possessed by the spirit of the demoness, Tataka. She begins healing people, poses as a devi and tries to kill Xena and Eli, who is the real devi.
83	15	"Between the Lines"	Rick Jacobson	Steven L. Sears	February 15, 1999
After being saved from her husband's funeral pyre, Naiyima sends Xena and Gabrielle on a spiritual journey to a future life. In that time Xena is the Mother of Peace and Gabrielle is a warrior prince, their enemy is the reincarnated Alti. Using the powers that Naiyima taught them, they bring Alti back to their own time and defeat her.
84	16	"The Way"	John Fawcett	R.J. Stewart	February 22, 1999
Eli and Gabrielle are kidnapped by Indrajit, and Xena and Hanuman go to rescue them. Hanuman tells Xena she will need Krishna's help to defeat Indrajit so she prays to him. He tells her she only need call his name and help will be given. After being saved, Gabrielle chooses to follow Eli's Way of Love and Xena dedicates herself to the Way of the Warrior.
85	17	"The Play's the Thing"	Christopher Graves	Ashley Gable & Thomas A. Swyden	March 1, 1999
Gabrielle gets the opportunity to have one of her scrolls turned into a play. She becomes embroiled in a scheme to con some warlords out of their money and cannot find an actress good enough to play herself.
86	18	"The Convert"	Andrew Merrifield	Chris Manheim	April 19, 1999
Joxer accidentally kills a warlord and feel guilt at his actions. He decides he has to tell the man's son himself. Meanwhile, Najara has escaped from prison and tells Xena and Gabrielle she now follows Eli's way of peace.
87	19	"Takes One to Know One"	Christopher Graves	Jeff Vlaming	April 26, 1999
A bounty hunter is found dead in Cyrene's inn and Discord declares she will take all of Xena's friend to Tartarus unless she brings her the real culprit. The whole gang turn detective to try to find the one responsible.
88	20	"Endgame"	Garth Maxwell	Steven L. Sears	May 3, 1999
Ephiny is killed by Brutus and Xena and Gabrielle learnt that the Amazons have been caught in the Roman civil war. Xena rescues some of the Amazons and lures Caesar and Pompey to fight each other again. Gabrielle and Brutus try to forge peace between Caesar and the Amazons.
89	21	"The Ides of March"	Ken Girotti	R.J. Stewart	May 10, 1999
With the help of the demonic Callisto, Caesar places a trap for Xena, with Gabrielle as the bait. As Xena and Gabrielle attempt an escape, Brutus revolts against Caesar and the vision Alti showed Xena comes to fulfillment.
90	22	"Déjà Vu All over Again"	Renee O'Connor	R.J. Stewart	May 17, 1999
In the present, Annie Day is a hardcore Xena fan with the belief that she is the reincarnation of Xena. She visits a past life therapist in order to discover the truth. She finds that she was Joxer, her boyfriend Harry was really Xena and the therapist was Gabrielle.
