= Xena: Warrior Princess season 1 =

Season of television series

Xena: Warrior Princess
- Season 1
- DVD cover
- Starring: Lucy Lawless
- No. of episodes: 24

Release
- Original release: September 4, 1995 – July 29, 1996

Season chronology
- Next → Season 2

The first season of the television series Xena: Warrior Princess commenced airing in the United States and Canada on September 4, 1995, concluded on July 29, 1996, and contained 24 episodes. It introduces Gabrielle (Renee O'Connor), the series co-star, beside Xena (Lucy Lawless), previously a secondary character in the TV series Hercules: The Legendary Journeys. Gabrielle becomes Xena's greatest ally; her initial naiveté helps to balance Xena and assists her in recognizing and pursuing the "greater good."

The first season aired in the United States in syndication; reruns later ran on the USA Network. The season was released on DVD as a seven disc boxed set under the title of Xena: Warrior Princess: The Complete First Season on April 23, 2003 by Anchor Bay Entertainment.

== Production ==
=== Crew ===
The season was produced by Pacific Renaissance Pictures in partnership with Universal Studios and was aired in first-run syndication in the U.S. The executive producers were Robert Tapert (series creator), with Sam Raimi and R. J. Stewart. The main staff writers were Tapert, Stewart and many others, as Steven L. Sears (co-executive producers), Terence Winter, Peter Allan Fields and Roy Thomas. Some of the first season's episodes were written or co-written by writers on a freelance basis. The regular directors throughout the season were Doug Lefler, Michael Levine, Charles Siebert, Jace Alexander, Josh Becker, John Cameron and Gary Jones. The theme music and opening sequence was composed by Joseph LoDuca.

=== Cast ===
The initial season used many New Zealand natives like Jay Laga'aia in the cast. Willa O'Neill played the sister of Gabrielle, Lila. Only the name of Lucy Lawless appears in the opening sequence although Renee O'Connor also stars.

Danielle Cormack played Ephiny, an Amazon warrior, and Alison Bruce played Melosa, queen of the Amazons. The main actors of Hercules: The Legendary Journeys, Kevin Sorbo and Michael Hurst, appeared during the season. Robert Trebor played Salmoneus, a friend of Hercules's famous for his "get rich quick" schemes. Kevin Tod Smith portrayed Ares in two episodes and in later seasons. The American actor Bruce Campbell portrayed Autolycus, the king of thieves, a character he originated in Hercules. Tim Thomerson played Meleager, a friend of Gabrielle and reformed drunk. Karl Urban played the biblic Mael, Karl also played Cupid and Julius Caesar in later seasons. Ted Raimi played Joxer and Hudson Leick played Callisto; both are idols of the series' fandom.

Numerous supporting characters have been given expansive and recurring appearances in the progressive storyline, including: Scott Garrison as Perdicas, Darien Takle as Cyrene, Tom Atkins as Atrius and Leslie Wing as Karis.

== Reception ==
The pilot episode garnered 4.5 million viewers, ranked in No. 44 in U.S. syndicated rank, behind Hercules: The Legendary Journeys and Star Trek: Deep Space Nine. Based on its strong opening, Robert Tapert produced another 23 episodes of the same style and duration. Season episode No. 12 garnered 6.3 million viewers, and was ranked in No. 13 in U.S. syndicated rank, only behind of Hercules: The Legendary Journeys. The season was down on viewers on its last episode, that garnered 3.9 million viewers, again behind Hercules and Deep Space Nine.

The first season was released in another 27 countries between 1995 and 1996, eventually being seen in 105 countries.

== Episodes ==
No. overall	No. in season	Title	Directed by	Written by	Original release date
1	1	"Sins of the Past"	Doug Lefler	Story by : Robert Tapert; Teleplay by : R.J. Stewart	September 4, 1995
Xena returns to Amphipolis, the place she grew up, in order to try to make up for past sins. On the way, she saves the people of Potidaea from the warlord Draco; her actions attract the attention of a young girl called Gabrielle, who decides to follow Xena in the hopes of a more exciting life.
2	2	"Chariots of War"	Harley Cokeliss	Story by : Josh Becker & Jack Perez; Teleplay by : Adam Armus & Nora Kay Foster	September 11, 1995
While defending a small and peaceful settlement from a vicious warlord and his son, Xena is shot with an arrow. She is cared for by a local family while Gabrielle is left to defend herself in the local tavern, which is filled with thieves and cut-throats.
3	3	"Dreamworker"	Bruce Seth Green	Steven L. Sears	September 18, 1995
When Manus (the High Priest of the Dream God Morpheus) kidnaps Gabrielle, Xena must face the demons of her past and enter the dream world to rescue her friend.
4	4	"Cradle of Hope"	Michael Levine	Terence Winter	September 25, 1995
Xena and Gabrielle go undercover after learning of a ransom put on an infant who is prophesied to one day take the throne from a powerful king. Note: This is the first episode to feature a humorous disclaimer in the closing credits.
5	5	"The Path Not Taken"	Stephen L. Posey	Julie Sherman	October 2, 1995
Xena is forced to pretend to be her old self, a money hungry warlord named Mezentius in order to save a young princess. However, along the way she is pushed to her limits when she discovers an old lover is working for an arms dealer. Note: It is in this episode that series lead Lucy Lawless first sings the dirge "Burial," whose music she composed herself.
6	6	"The Reckoning"	Charles Siebert	Peter Allan Fields	October 16, 1995
Xena is mistakenly put on trial for killing a group of townspeople, causing Ares, God of War (Kevin Tod Smith), to be delighted with a plan he has enacted.
7	7	"The Titans"	Eric Brevig	R.J. Stewart	October 30, 1995
Gabrielle reads an incantation from a script that releases three titans from being a stone tomb. She convinces them she is a Goddess and has them perform helpful tasks for a small village nearby; however, after they soon start to suspect her of lying, they turn on the town and threaten to destroy the town for good.
8	8	"Prometheus"	Stephen L. Posey	R.J. Stewart	November 6, 1995
9	9	"Death in Chains"	Charles Siebert	Story by : Babs Greyhosky & Adam Armus & Nora Kay Foster; Teleplay by : Adam Armus & Nora Kay Foster	November 13, 1995
10	10	"Hooves and Harlots"	Jace Alexander	Steven L. Sears	November 20, 1995
Someone is trying to start a war between the Amazons and the centaurs, which Xena tries to prevent after a dying Amazon princess leaves Gabrielle her right of caste.
11	11	"The Black Wolf"	Mario Di Leo	Alan Jay Glueckman	January 8, 1996
12	12	"Beware Greeks Bearing Gifts"	T.J. Scott	Story by : Roy Thomas & Janis Hendler; Teleplay by : Adam Armus & Nora Kay Foster	January 15, 1996
13	13	"Athens City Academy of the Performing Bards"	Jace Alexander	R.J. Stewart & Steven L. Sears	January 22, 1996
14	14	"A Fistful of Dinars"	Josh Becker	Steven L. Sears & R.J. Stewart	January 29, 1996
15	15	"Warrior... Princess"	Michael Levine	Brenda Lilly	February 5, 1996
16	16	"Mortal Beloved"	Garth Maxwell	R.J. Stewart	February 12, 1996
17	17	"The Royal Couple of Thieves"	John Cameron	Steven L. Sears	February 19, 1996
Xena drafts Autolycus (Bruce Campbell, one of Sam Raimi's partners in Pacific Renaissance Pictures) to steal back the property of some friends of hers, which turns out to be the Ark of the Covenant.
18	18	"The Prodigal"	John T. Kretchmer	Chris Manheim	March 4, 1996
19	19	"Altared States"	Michael Levine	Chris Manheim	April 22, 1996
20	20	"Ties That Bind"	Charles Siebert	Adam Armus & Nora Kay Foster	April 29, 1996
21	21	"The Greater Good"	Gary Jones	Steven L. Sears	May 6, 1996
22	22	"Callisto"	T. J. Scott	R.J. Stewart	May 13, 1996
23	23	"Death Mask"	Stewart Main	Peter Allan Fields	June 3, 1996
24	24	"Is There a Doctor in the House?"	T.J. Scott	Patricia Manney	July 29, 1996

== Home release ==
The DVD release of season one was released by Anchor Bay Entertainment in the U.S. on September 23, 2003 after it had completed broadcast on television. As well as every episode from the season, the DVD release features bonus material including deleted scenes, bloopers and behind-the-scenes featurettes.

The Complete First Season
Set details			Special features
24 episodes; 1080 minutes; 7-disc set; 5.1 Surround Sound; Languages: English (Dolby Digital 5.1)			Director and Actor Biographies; Series Trivia; Xena Chronicles; Season One Photo Gallery; Direct Access Screens; Xena Screensaver
Release dates			Director and Actor Biographies; Series Trivia; Xena Chronicles; Season One Photo Gallery; Direct Access Screens; Xena Screensaver
UK	USA	Australia	Director and Actor Biographies; Series Trivia; Xena Chronicles; Season One Photo Gallery; Direct Access Screens; Xena Screensaver
June 6, 2006	April 23, 2003	October 12, 2005	Director and Actor Biographies; Series Trivia; Xena Chronicles; Season One Photo Gallery; Direct Access Screens; Xena Screensaver
