= Xena: Warrior Princess season 3 =

Xena: Warrior Princess
- Season 3
- DVD cover
- No. of episodes: 22

Release
- Original network: Syndication
- Original release: September 29, 1997 – May 23, 1998

Season chronology
- ← Previous; Season 2 Next → Season 4

The third season of the television series Xena: Warrior Princess commenced airing in the United States and Canada on September 29, 1997, concluded on May 23, 1998, and contained 22 episodes.

The Third season aired in the United States on the USA Network. The season was released on DVD as a five disc boxed set under the title of Xena: Warrior Princess: Season 3 in February 2004 by Anchor Bay Entertainment.

== Production ==
=== Cast ===
- Lucy Lawless as Xena
- Renee O'Connor as Gabrielle
- Ted Raimi as Joxer
- Kevin Smith as Ares, God of War
- Hudson Leick as Callisto
- Karl Urban as Caesar
- Alexandra Tydings as Aphrodite
- Marton Csokas as Borias
- Danielle Cormack as Ephiny
- Bruce Campbell as Autolycus

== Episodes ==
No. overall	No. in season	Title	Directed by	Written by	Original release date	Prod. code
47	1	"The Furies"	Gilbert Shilton	R.J. Stewart	September 29, 1997	V0224
Ares convinces the Furies to inflict persecution and madness on Xena because she has not avenged the death of her father. Xena heads off to find the culprit, only to discover it was her mother, Cyrene. With the help of Gabrielle and a tale from Cyrene about Xena's conception, Xena is able to persuade the Furies that Ares is her father.
48	2	"Been There, Done That"	Andrew Merrifield	Hilary J. Bader	October 6, 1997	V0227
Cupid causes a town to relive the same day over and over until a hero can help the two star-crossed lovers from feuding families. Xena is the only person who knows the day is resetting and must work alone to save the day and break the curse. Note: The episode has a similar premise as Groundhog Day.
49	3	"The Dirty Half Dozen"	Rick Jacobson	Steven L. Sears	October 13, 1997	V0411
Xena seeks the help of a group of Greece's best convicts against Agathon. Ares has given Agathon the Metal of Hephaestus to forge his new superior weapons and it is up to Xena and the others to stop Agathon.
50	4	"The Deliverer"	Oley Sassone	Steven L. Sears	October 20, 1997	V0401
Xena travels to Britannia to help Boadicea in her fight against Caesar. While there Gabrielle learns about a cult who worships "The One God". She is tricked into killing one of the priestesses and is impregnated with the spawn of the evil Dahak.
51	5	"Gabrielle's Hope"	Andrew Merrifield & Charles Siebert	R.J. Stewart	October 20, 1997	V0402
As the baby in Gabrielle's womb grows at an alarming rate, she and Xena are followed by Banshees and the Knights of the Round Table. The knights fear that the unborn child is the great evil they have heard about. When Xena finds one of the knights dead, she decides that the baby is evil incarnate and must be killed.
52	6	"The Debt"	Oley Sassone	Story by : Robert Tapert & R.J. Stewart; Teleplay by : R.J. Stewart	November 3, 1997	V0406
Xena receives a message telling her to kill the "Green Dragon". As she travels to Qin to complete the request she tells Gabrielle about her and Borias and the time they met Lao Ma, one of the first people who tried to teach Xena about The Way.
53	7	"The Debt II"	Oley Sassone	Story by : Robert Tapert & R.J. Stewart; Teleplay by : R.J. Stewart	November 10, 1997	V0407
After betraying Xena to Ming T'ien, Gabrielle begs for forgiveness and asks Ming T'ien to spare Xena's life. While awaiting execution, Xena remembers what Lao Ma had been trying to teach her, which gives her access to special powers.
54	8	"The King of Assassins"	Bruce Campbell	Adam Armus & Nora Kay Foster	November 17, 1997	V0410
To prevent the assassination of Cleopatra, Gabrielle joins up with Autolycus and Joxer. The problem is the assassin is Joxer's brother Jett, who looks identical.
55	9	"Warrior... Priestess... Tramp"	Robert Ginty	Adam Armus & Nora Kay Foster	January 12, 1998	V0404
Meg switches place with her look-alike, the Hestian Priestess Leah, so that she and a corrupt priest can bring the cult into disrepute. Meanwhile, Leah experiences life in the world beyond the temple.
56	10	"The Quill is Mightier..."	Andrew Merrifield	Hilary J. Bader	January 19, 1998	V0408
Aphrodite decides to have some fun and enchants Gabrielle's scroll so that everything she writes comes true. The resulting chaos leads both Ares and Aphrodite to lose their powers and sends Xena on a fishing trip.
57	11	"Maternal Instincts"	Mark Beesley	Chris Manheim	February 7, 1998	V0405
Hope returns and releases Callisto from the lava and presents herself to Gabrielle, who decides to keep Hope a secret from Xena. Meanwhile, Hope and Callisto plan to murder Solan.
58	12	"The Bitter Suite"	Oley Sassone	Steven L. Sears & Chris Manheim	February 14, 1998	V0409
After fighting and attempting to kill each other, Xena and Gabrielle are transported to the land of Illusia. In the strange land they journey through their shared hatred and pain and regain their lost friendship.
59	13	"One Against an Army"	Paul Lynch	Gene O'Neill & Noreen Tobin	February 21, 1998	V0413
During the Persian War, Xena and Gabrielle shelter in an old barn. Xena plans to use the weapons there to stall the advancing army. Gabrielle is then hit with a poisoned dart and Xena must fight the army alone while trying to keep Gabrielle alive.
60	14	"Forgiven"	Garth Maxwell	R.J. Stewart	February 28, 1998	V0415
Tara, a bratty tearaway teen, wants to replace Gabrielle as Xena's sidekick. She beats Gabrielle and leads Xena to the stolen Urn of Apollo.
61	15	"King Con"	Janet Greek	Chris Manheim	March 7, 1998	V0403
Xena and Gabrielle join forces with a couple of con men after Joxer is almost beaten to death on the order of the local casino manager. Her plan is to take the owner to the cleaners. The two men make a bet: who will be the first to kiss Xena? Things get complicated when Xena starts falling for Rafe.
62	16	"When in Rome..."	John Laing	Steven L. Sears	March 14, 1998	V0416
To force Caesar's hand in releasing the Gaulish chief, Vercinix, Xena kidnaps Crassus, one of Caesar's allies. Xena rescues Vercinix and places Crassus in his stead. It is up to Caesar and Gabrielle either to save Crassus or let him be executed in Vercinix's place.
63	17	"Forget Me Not"	Charlie Haskell	Hilary J. Bader	March 21, 1998	V0417
Still pained by the memories of Hope and recent events, Gabrielle seeks the help of Mnemosyne, the Titan goddess of memory. A priestess sends her on a dream journey into the "river of wailing" and the "river of woe" with Ares as her guide. Upon completion of the journey she is given the choice to suffer the pain or let it go, and all her happy memories along with it.
64	18	"Fins, Femmes & Gems"	Josh Becker	Story by : Robert Tapert and Adam Armus & Nora Kay Foster; Teleplay by : Adam Armus & Nora Kay Foster	April 25, 1998	V0418
Aphrodite wants to steal the North Star to put in her own constellation, so she puts charms on Xena, Gabrielle and Joxer. Xena becomes preoccupied with fishing, Gabrielle, with herself and Joxer becomes "Attis the Ape Man".
65	19	"Tsunami"	John Laing	Chris Manheim	May 2, 1998	V0414
Gabrielle, Xena and Autolycus are trapped in a ship's hull after it is hit by a tsunami. Xena comes up with a risky plan to save everyone and get them all to the surface.
66	20	"Vanishing Act"	Andrew Merrifield	Terry Winter	May 9, 1998	V0421
After a golden statue is stolen, Xena calls on Autolycus, the King of Thieves, to help her steal it back. She and Gabrielle pose as rival buyers in order to discover where the statue is being hidden.
67	21	"Sacrifice"	David Warry-Smith	Steven L. Sears	May 16, 1998	V0420
Callisto, with the help of Dahak's priest, brings Hope back into the world. Ares sides with Dahak rather than against him. He tells Gabrielle that if Xena kills Hope, the Fates will cut her life thread and she will die too.
68	22	"Sacrifice II"	Rick Jacobson	Paul Robert Coyle	May 23, 1998	V0419
Ares and Hope consummate their new relationship and followers of Dahak plan a sacrifice that will usher him into the world. Meanwhile, Xena searches for the Hind's Blood Dagger, the only thing she knows of capable of killing Hope. In the end, Gabrielle sacrifices herself to save Xena by falling into the lava pit and taking Hope with her. Xena kills Callisto with the Hind's Blood Dagger in a fit of rage.
