= Xena: Warrior Princess season 2 =

Xena: Warrior Princess
- Season 2
- DVD cover
- No. of episodes: 22

Release
- Original release: September 30, 1996 – May 19, 1997

Season chronology
- ← Previous; Season 1 Next → Season 3

The second season of the television series Xena: Warrior Princess commenced airing in the United States and Canada on September 30, 1996, concluded on May 19, 1997, and contained 22 episodes.

Xena: Warrior Princess was a syndicated series. Re-runs aired in the United States on the USA Network. The season was released on DVD as a six disc boxed set under the title of Xena: Warrior Princess: Season 2 on September 3, 2003 by Anchor Bay Entertainment.

== Production ==
Crew

Produced by Liz Friedman and Eric Gruendemann, Cinematography was made by Donald Duncan. Editing by Robert Field, Casting directed by Diana Rowan. Production design made by Robert Gillies. Costume Design by Ngila Dickson, Phil Chitty was the construction manager, Kate Lang sculptor (noncredit) and Roger Murray the props designer (noncredit). Special Effects by Brendon Durey, visual Effects by Kevin Blank, Phil Carbonaro and Anna Tkatch. Dennis Thompson was in charge of the Camera and Electrical Department and Simone Knight was in charge of costumes.

== Reception ==
The supervising sound editor, Jason Schmid, won the one-hour series sound editing award at the Motion Picture Sound Editors' Golden Reel Awards for the season's fourth episode, "Girls Just Wanna Have Fun."

== Episodes ==
No. overall	No. in season	Title	Directed by	Written by	Original release date	Prod. code
25	1	"Orphan of War"	Charles Siebert	Steven L. Sears	September 30, 1996	V0206
Xena meets Solan, the son she gave to the centaur, Kaleipus to raise. Xena battles Dagnine, who has used the power of the Ixion Stone ("Ixion was the father of centaurs") to transform himself into the most powerful centaur ever known.
26	2	"Remember Nothing"	Anson Williams	Story by : Steven L. Sears & Chris Manheim; Teleplay by : Steven L. Sears	October 7, 1996	V0201
After Xena saves the Fates from attack, they give her the chance to live her life again; if she agrees to give up her warrior ways. She accepts and in the new life, her beloved-brother, Lyceus is still alive, but her mother is dead and Gabrielle is a warlord's slave.
27	3	"The Giant Killer"	Gary Jones	Terence Winter	October 14, 1996	V0204
Xena faces her old friend Goliath in battle when he refuses to turn his back on the ruthless Philistines.
28	4	"Girls Just Wanna Have Fun"	T. J. Scott	Nora Kay Foster & Adam Armus	October 28, 1996	V0202
Joxer meets with Xena and Gabrielle and delivers a package containing the head of Orpheus. Bacchus has decapitated him, and Orpheus asks Xena to find his lyre in order to stop Bacchus. While searching a nearby town, Gabrielle dances with a group of Bacchus' bacchae: female vampires created by Bacchus. Meanwhile, Xena defeats two bacchae but is unable to take the lyre from them. The next day Xena, still carrying Orpheus' head, Gabrielle, and Joxer go to the cemetery next to Bacchus' catacombs to collect dryad bones. These bones are the only thing capable of piercing a bacchae's heart and killing them. Xena kills one of the skeletal, winged dryads and procures a sharp bone. After the battle, Gabrielle turns into a bacchae, having been bitten by another bacchae the day before. She escapes into the catecombs, with Xena and Joxer following. When they arrive, Gabrielle is about to drink Bacchus' blood from a cup and become a permanent bacchae. Xena knocks the cup to the ground with her chakram. A fight ensues and Xena attempts to kill Bacchus, but only a bacchae can kill him. Xena lets Gabrielle bite her so that she also becomes a bacchae. Able to resist Bacchus normal control over bacchae, Xena kills Bacchus and return Orpheus' lyre. Gabrielle and the other girls are restored to normal.
29	5	"Return of Callisto"	T.J. Scott	R. J. Stewart	November 4, 1996	V0210
As Gabrielle and Perdicus marry, Callisto breaks out of prison and murders Perdicus. Gabrielle wants Xena to teach her how to kill Callisto, so she can exact her revenge.
30	6	"Warrior... Princess... Tramp"	Josh Becker	R. J. Stewart	November 11, 1996	V0205
Xena's look-alike, Princess Diana, is kidnapped and Meg, yet another look-alike, is recruited to impersonate her. Xena is called by the king to help rescue her. All three begin impersonating each other and much confusion ensues.
31	7	"Intimate Stranger"	Gary Jones	Steven L. Sears	November 18, 1996	V0211
Callisto convinces Ares to switch her body with that of Xena and she escapes from Tartarus. Hades allows Xena, now in Callisto's body, to go after her. Callisto, in Xena's body, causes trouble for Xena's friends and family.
32	8	"Ten Little Warlords"	Charles Siebert	Paul Robert Coyle	November 25, 1996	V0215
Ares' sword is stolen and he loses his powers along with it. King Sisyphus brings Xena (still in Callisto's body) and some warlords together for a final battle to decide who will sit on the deposed Ares' throne. His plan is to take Ares' place and escape from Tartarus.
33	9	"A Solstice Carol"	John T. Kretchmer	Chris Manheim	December 9, 1996	V0209
Xena and Gabrielle arrive in a kingdom where celebrating the Solstice is forbidden. Xena devises a plan to stop King Silvus from closing an orphanage. He is visited by three ghosts, who show him the error of his wicked ways.
34	10	"The Xena Scrolls"	Charlie Haskell	Story by : Robert Sidney Mellette; Teleplay by : Nora Kay Foster & Adam Armus	January 13, 1997	V0208
In 1940, the archaeologist, Janice Covington is searching for the key to unlock a tomb containing the ancient Xena Scrolls. With the help of Melinda Pappas and Jacques S'er she finds the scrolls and releases Ares from his tomb. Note: The is the first clip episode of the series.
35	11	"Here She Comes... Miss Amphipolis"	Marina Sargenti	Chris Manheim	January 20, 1997	V0212
Salmoneus summons Xena to help keep the peace in the kingdom where he is organising the Miss Known World Beauty Pageant. Xena enters the contest as Miss Amphipolis so she can figure out who is sabotaging the pageant.
36	12	"Destiny"	Robert Tapert	Story by : Robert Tapert; Teleplay by : R.J. Stewart & Steven L. Sears	January 27, 1997	V0207
Xena is badly injured and Gabrielle must take her on a long journey to a healer on Mount Nestos. While unconscious Xena remembers the first time she met Caesar, and the actions that turned her into an angry warlord.
37	13	"The Quest"	Michael Levine	Story by : Steven L. Sears & R.J. Stewart & Chris Manheim; Teleplay by : Steven L. Sears	February 3, 1997	V0221
While mourning Xena's death, Gabrielle has to lead the Amazons, who want to give Xena an Amazon funeral. Autolycus, King of Thieves, tries to deal with being possessed by Xena's spirit, who uses his body to steal her body. He and Gabrielle must get to the Ambrosia in time or Xena will remain dead. Meanwhile, Velasca is angry at being passed over as queen.
38	14	"A Necessary Evil"	Mark Beesley	Paul Robert Coyle	February 10, 1997	V0219
Velasca, having eaten Ambrosia, has become a goddess and attacks the Amazon camp. Xena makes a deal with Callisto, who agrees to fight Velasca for a chance to get her hands on some Ambrosia.
39	15	"A Day in the Life"	Michael Hurst	R.J. Stewart	February 17, 1997	V0223
Two villages need Xena's help, but she cannot be in both places at once. One needs protection from a giant, the other from an evil warlord.
40	16	"For Him the Bell Tolls"	Josh Becker	Adam Armus & Nora Kay Foster	February 24, 1997	V0220
Responding to an urgent message from King Lias, Xena decides to go away for a few days, leaving Gabrielle and Joxer behind. Aphrodite has some fun when she causes Joxer to become a hero every time a bell rings.
41	17	"The Execution"	Garth Maxwell	Paul Robert Coyle	April 7, 1997	V0218
Xena and Gabrielle are summoned to a village by Meleager the Mighty, and find that their famous warrior friend has just been convicted of murder. Garielle breaks him out of jail and Xena looks for the real culprit.
42	18	"Blind Faith"	Josh Becker	Nora Kay Foster & Adam Armus	April 14, 1997	V0214
An aspiring warrior kidnaps Gabrielle so that he can pick a fight with Xena. During the fight Xena is splashed with sumac oil and begins losing her sight. Meanwhile, Gabrielle has been sold to a man who wants to marry her to the recently dead king.
43	19	"Ulysses"	Michael Levine	R.J. Stewart	April 28, 1997	V0213
Poseidon warns Xena to stay out of his fight with Ulysses, King of Ithaca, but she is determined to see justice done.
44	20	"The Price"	Oley Sassone	Steven L. Sears	May 5, 1997	V0217
Xena and Gabrielle encounter the axe-wielding Horde, who slew Xena's old army. The mixture of fear and hatred she feels for the Horde make Xena begin reverting to her old cruel, bloodthirsty self in order to defeat her enemy.
45	21	"Lost Mariner"	Garth Maxwell	Steven L. Sears	May 12, 1997	V0226
Gabrielle finds herself on the cursed ship of the Lost Mariner, Cecrops and Xena must save her friend and break the curse.
46	22	"A Comedy of Eros"	Charles Siebert	Chris Manheim	May 19, 1997	V0225
Cupid's son, Bliss, steals one of his father's crossbows and proceeds to wreak havoc on the mortal world.
