= Xena: Warrior Princess season 5 =

Xena: Warrior Princess
- Season 5
- DVD cover
- No. of episodes: 22

Release
- Original network: USA Network
- Original release: September 27, 1999 – May 22, 2000

Season chronology
- ← Previous; Season 4 Next → Season 6

The fifth season of the television series Xena: Warrior Princess commenced airing in the United States and Canada on September 27, 1999, and concluded on May 22, 2000, and contained 22 episodes.

The fifth season aired in the United States on the USA Network. The season was released on DVD as a ten disc boxed set under the title of Xena: Warrior Princess: Season 5 on October 19, 2004, by Anchor Bay Entertainment.

The episode "Antony and Cleopatra" has been discussed as a reworking of Shakespeare's play of the same name.

== Episodes ==
| No. overall | No. in season | Title | Directed by | Written by | Original release date | Prod. code |
|---|---|---|---|---|---|---|
| 91 | 1 | "Fallen Angel" | John Fawcett | Story by : Robert Tapert & R.J. Stewart; Teleplay by : R.J. Stewart | September 27, 1999 | V0903 |
Joxer, Eli and Amarice take Xena and Gabrielle's bodies and prepare to take them back to Greece to be buried. Meanwhile in Heaven, Xena and Gabrielle are greeted by some angels when they are attacked by a gang of demons led by Callisto.
| 92 | 2 | "Chakram" | Doug Lefler | Chris Manheim | October 4, 1999 | V0901 |
Having been resurrected, Xena has no memory of her life as a warrior. Ares and another war god, Kal, pursue her in order to get her to find the Chakram of Light. Meanwhile, Joxer plucks up the courage to tell Gabrielle that he loves her.
| 93 | 3 | "Succession" | Rick Jacobson | Steven L. Sears | October 11, 1999 | V0902 |
When Ares suggests he will someday need a successor, the warrior woman he is sleeping with, Mavican, suggests it should be her. This gives Ares the idea of sending her along with Xena and Gabrielle through a vortex to an alternate dimension to battle. First Xena doesn't understand why she could see the battles between Gaby and Mavican while unable to participate herself. It turns out that she and Gabrielle share one body in this place, one in the day, the other in the night. Mavican captures Gabrielle and decides rather than kill her, she should keep her alive as live bait, so she knocks Gabrielle out. When Gaby awakens in a bamboo cage, the sun rises and Xena takes her turn in the cage. When Ares mentions that he had never realized she would make a good successor, Xena finally realizes it is Gabrielle and not Mavican that he is talking about. With Xena forbidden to kill Mavican, she simply causes Mavican to admit she needs Ares' help in defeating Xena, which in Ares' view disqualifies her as a successor. So Xena and Gabrielle are returned to the natural world while Mavican is sentenced to eternity in the odd dimension.
| 94 | 4 | "Animal Attraction" | Rick Jacobson | Chris Manheim | October 18, 1999 | V0905 |
Xena finally discovers she is pregnant and Gabrielle finally gets a horse of her own. The two women meet Talia, an old friend of Xena.
| 95 | 5 | "Them Bones, Them Bones" | John Fawcett | Buddy Williers (aka Steven L. Sears) | November 1, 1999 | V0908 |
Xena realizes that Alti's spirit has been harming her baby's soul in the spirit world. She, Gabrielle and Amarice go to find Yakut, so she can help Xena fight Alti and save her baby's soul.
| 96 | 6 | "Purity" | Mark Beesley | Jeff Vlaming | November 8, 1999 | V0907 |
Xena, Gabrielle and Joxer head to Qin so that Xena can retrieve Lao Ma's Book of Wisdom to stop in falling into the wrong hands. When they arrive Xena is greeted by Pao Ssu and K'ao Hsin, the twin daughters of Lao Ma. Pao Ssu has the secret of the Black powder and wants to use it to rule Qin.
| 97 | 7 | "Back in the Bottle" | Rick Jacobson | Story by : Robert Tapert & Steven L. Sears; Teleplay by : Steven L. Sears | November 15, 1999 | V0909 |
After being defeated by Xena, Pao Ssu's spirit join with that of her brother Ming T'ien. They team up with Khan and his army so they can attack Qin. Xena uses the wisdom left by Lao Ma to stand up against the army alone.
| 98 | 8 | "Little Problems" | Allison Liddi | Gregg Ostrin | November 22, 1999 | V0913 |
Xena is accidentally trapped in the body of a young girl Daphne, by Aphrodite. Aphrodite and Gabrielle need to find a way to reverse it before sunset. Meanwhile, Xena helps Daphne's father through his grief.
| 99 | 9 | "Seeds of Faith" | Garth Maxwell | George Strayton & Tom O'Neill | January 10, 2000 | V0912 |
Ares feels threatened by Eli and decides to kill him. Xena and Gabrielle swear they will protect Eli from Ares, but he tells them they cannot use violence to save his life. The newly-angelic Callisto re-appears, bringing several shocking revelations with her.
| 100 | 10 | "Lyre, Lyre, Hearts on Fire" | Mark Beesley | Adam Armus & Nora Kay Foster | January 17, 2000 | V0911 |
Xena, Gabrielle and Joxer head to Melodia, Greece's musical capital, to participate in a battle of the bands to retrieve the Golden Lyre. Meanwhile, Joxer is embarrassed by his brother, Jace.
| 101 | 11 | "Punch Lines" | Andrew Merrifield | Chris Manheim | January 24, 2000 | V0910 |
Gabrielle upsets the God of Despair, Lachrymose, and he shrinks her and Argo. Gabrielle tries to keep the situation from Xena, until she can make the god laugh and break the spell.
| 102 | 12 | "God Fearing Child" | Phil Sgriccia | Story by : Chris Manheim; Teleplay by : Roberto Orci & Alex Kurtzman | February 7, 2000 | V0915 |
Zeus is informed that Xena's baby will bring about the end of the gods so he decides she must die. Xena and Gabrielle steal Hades' Helmet of Invisibility to hide from the gods and Hercules vows to protect Xena and her baby from the gods.
| 103 | 13 | "Eternal Bonds" | Mark Beesley | Chris Manheim | February 14, 2000 | V0916 |
After the birth of Eve, the gods continue to pursue Xena so they can kill the baby. During the fighting, Joxer is wounded by a poisonous sword and he and Gabrielle race to find the cure.
| 104 | 14 | "Amphipolis Under Siege" | Mark Beesley | Chris Black | February 21, 2000 | V0919 |
Xena takes Eve back to Amphipolis to meet her grandmother. While there, Athena says she will lay siege to the village until they give up the baby. Cyrene rallies the other villagers to support Xena and the baby as they stand in defiance against Athena.
| 105 | 15 | "Married with Fishsticks" | Paul Grinder | Kevin Maynard | February 28, 2000 | V0914 |
Gabrielle is knocked unconscious and awakes in a fantasy world, where she is a fishwife to Hagar (Ted Raimi) with no memory. Her husband is using Gabrielle as his wife to win an election. Meanwhile, her friends are all trying to steal him for themselves.
| 106 | 16 | "Lifeblood" | Michael Hurst | Story by : Rob Tapert & R.J. Stewart; Teleplay by : R.J. Stewart and George Strayton & Tom O'Neill | March 13, 2000 | V0924 |
Xena is shown a vision, which reveals that the Amazons have strayed from their roots. The Amazons summon the Utma, a woman from the future, who will lead their people. Incorporates footage with Selma Blair from a rejected spin-off pilot, Amazon High.
| 107 | 17 | "Kindred Spirits" | Josh Becker | George Strayton & Tom O'Neill | April 17, 2000 | V0918 |
While at the Amazon camp, Gabrielle ponders whether to stay and rule the Amazons as queen or continue on her journey with Xena. Meanwhile, Joxer has been caught peeking at the Amazon women and is sentenced to the penalty of mortal combat.
| 108 | 18 | "Antony & Cleopatra" | Michael Hurst | Carl Ellsworth | April 24, 2000 | V0904 |
When Cleopatra is murdered, Xena takes her place in order to put a stop to a war between Antony, Brutus and Octavius that will devastate Egypt. Inspired by the Battle of Actium and the events leading to it.
| 109 | 19 | "Looking Death in the Eye" | Garth Maxwell | Carl Ellsworth | May 1, 2000 | V0920 |
Still pursued by the gods, Xena comes up with a plan to fake their deaths so that the gods will cease their endless quest to kill Eve. Unfortunately Ares, believing them really dead, takes Xena and Gabrielle and entombs them on a cave on Mount Aetna.
| 110 | 20 | "Livia" | Rick Jacobson | Chris Manheim | May 8, 2000 | V0921 |
Twenty five years later, Eve has become Livia, a Roman warrior and protégée of Ares. Xena and Gabrielle wake from their slumber and find Joxer married to Meg. He tells them he thought they were dead. They meet Joxer's son, Virgil and Xena goes up against Livia in battle.
| 111 | 21 | "Eve" | Mark Beesley | George Strayton & Tom O'Neill | May 15, 2000 | V0922 |
After being beaten by Xena, Livia takes her troops and kills whole villages. Joxer stands up to her but she kills him. Xena decides that Livia is not Eve; Eve is dead. After being bested in a fight, Xena prays to Eli to save Eve.
| 112 | 22 | "Motherhood" | Rick Jacobson | Story by : Robert Tapert; Teleplay by : R.J. Stewart | May 22, 2000 | V0923 |
Eve, now reformed, is tormented by her past misdeeds. The gods discover she is still alive and Eli's God gives Xena the power to kill gods as long as Eve, now a messenger of Eli, lives. Xena battles the gods and kills Poseidon, Hephaestus, and Discord. Athena sends the Furies to plague Gabrielle, who snaps and mortally stabs Eve while Xena is distracted by Ares. Xena, mistaking Gabrielle for an Olympian assassin, seriously wounds Gabrielle in turn by throwing her chakram at her, gashing her head and rendering her unconscious. A sudden attack by the remaining gods (except Ares, who points a sword at Eve) results in the death of Hades and Deimos. Aphrodite, asked by Xena, transports Xena, Eve, and Gabrielle to the Greek Pantheon; Artemis attempts to kill Xena with arrows only to have them thrown back at her that results in death. While battling Athena, Xena realizes that Eve is dead, thus draining her of her power to slay gods. As Athena is about to kill Xena, Ares relinquishes his immortality to heal Gabrielle and resurrect Eve, allowing Xena to kill Athena.
