= The Bitter Suite =

12th episode of the 3rd season of Xena: Warrior Princess

- Xena Warrior Princess episode
- Xena and Gabrielle, trapped in Illusia by the manifestations of their mutual hate.
- Episode no.: Season 3 Episode 12
- Directed by: Oley Sassone
- Written by: Chris Manheim; Steven L. Sears
- Production code: V0409
- Original air date: February 2, 1998

Guest appearances
- Ted Raimi (Joxer); Hudson Leick (Callisto); Kevin Smith (Ares)

Episode chronology
← Previous "Maternal Instincts"	Next → "One Against an Army"
- Xena: Warrior Princess (season 3)

"The Bitter Suite" is the twelfth episode of the third season of the American-New Zealand fantasy adventure series Xena: Warrior Princess, and the 58th episode overall. Originally aired on syndication on February 2, 1998, the episode, a musical, was written by Chris Manheim and Steven L. Sears and directed by Oley Sassone.

The series focuses on Xena (Lucy Lawless), a warrior in a quest to seek redemption for her past sins as a ruthless warlord by using her fighting skills to help people. Her best friend and traveling companion is Gabrielle (Renee O'Connor).

In the episode, Xena and Gabrielle are brought to the Land of Illusia, where they have to work together again, letting their past mutual grievances go, in order to escape alive. Throughout the episode Xena and Gabrielle deal with the problems that had recently torn them apart and learn to focus on the stronger bond that brought them together in the first place.

The episode started the trend of many non-musical, live-action TV shows doing at least one musical episode.

== Acclaim ==
Noted for being a rare musical episode of the series, combining both humor and drama, "The Bitter Suite" was nominated for two Emmy Awards. Regular series composer Joseph LoDuca was nominated for Outstanding Music and Lyrics for the song "The Love of Your Love" and LoDuca and lyricist Dennis Spiegel were nominated in the same category for the song "Hearts Are Hurting." It was LoDuca's second and third nominations for the series out of a total of seven nominations, and one award, through the six-year run of the series.

== Plot ==
After Gabrielle's daughter Hope kills Xena's son Solan in the previous episode, a rift grows between them, with Xena blaming Gabrielle for Solan's death.

At the start of the episode, Xena attacks and attempts to kill Gabrielle, only to be thwarted at the last moment when both fall into the sea and are brought to the land of Illusia. Both of them awaken completely nude, and are guided and given new clothing by Callisto and Joxer. Then Ares, Lila, and their associates try to set Xena and Gabrielle against each other.

The land of Illusia is never actually explained, though it is implied that it was created by a primordial divine force called 'Aleph', and by 'the fates'. The entire episode appears to be a deus ex machina to bring the two of them back together when nothing else could. Throughout the episode the two are forced to realize what drove them apart, and what is truly important to them. Ultimately realizing that the only thing separating the two of them is hate, and that they truly do love each other, and would sacrifice their own lives for each other.

== Production ==
"We decided to use an orchestra and chorus for the episode. We also brought in a Broadway director/choreographer named Jeff Calhoun, I had a chance to work with some wonderful lyricists; all the things that wouldn't be part of an ordinary episode. There are seven main numbers, as many as you would find in a full-length musical. As you tend to find with any Xena episode, we cram that TV screen with music and images and special fx, and this episode is no different."

— Joseph LoDuca, series Soundtrack, about The Bitter Suite.

"The Bitter Suite" was shot in November 1997, in New Zealand. Some actors of the previous episode return, Hudson Leick as Callisto, Danielle Cormack, as Ephiny, and David Taylor as Solan. Other old actors in the series return in that episode, as Ted Raimi, Kevin Smith, Willa O'Neill, Karl Urban and Marton Csokas. The series executive producer, Robert Tapert, was originally going to direct the episode himself, but he was forced to pull out at the last minute because of complications on Hercules: The Legendary Journeys. Kevin Smith was unable to rehearse the tango sequence in the episode with Lucy Lawless because Lucy had sprained her knee getting off her horse. Kevin had to rehearse with a dance instructor a foot shorter than Lucy. All ended well as Lucy's knee healed in a week, and Lucy was much easier to dance with because of her height. Hudson Leick's singing voice was dubbed in this episode by Broadway and film star Michelle Nicastro, although Leick did provide the narrations from Paul Foster Case's The Book of Tokens, and she also voiced the parts of the lyrics that sound more like talking than singing. Renee O'Connor's singing voice was dubbed by Broadway singer Susan Wood. Lucy Lawless, Kevin Smith, Ted Raimi, and Willa O'Neill did their own singing for the episode.

At the Panathenaea Convention in London, England, on September 2, 2000, Willa O'Neill mentioned that she did her own singing in "The Bitter Suite." She explained that she had to audition to Joseph LoDuca in Detroit by telephone. When they recorded the songs, the singing was done in a sound studio in New Zealand, but the actual taping was done in Detroit. After taping it, they then played it back while filming the episode. She found it weird to hear her voice singing during the filming.

== Tarot card references ==
The costumes and scenes in "The Bitter Suite" are based upon tarot cards. The most-often referenced tarot deck is the 1931 BOTA tarot deck, and the second most-often referenced tarot deck is the 1977 Golden Dawn tarot deck by Israel Regardie and illustrator Robert Wang. Other referenced decks include the 1909 Rider–Waite tarot deck, the fiorentine minchiate deck, and the swiss 1JJ tarot deck.

Callisto was the fool and then justice; Xena was the high priestess, then the chariot, and also death for a short time; Gabrielle was the star, then the empress, and then the world; Joxer was the hanged man and then the hermit; Ares was the emperor; Lila was the hierophant; and Solon was the magician. In chronological order, scenes were made to resemble the high priestess, wheel of fortune, the hanged man, the lovers, the moon, the chariot, the tower, judgement, the devil, temperance, and the sun.

Most of the tarot-based costumes are based upon those depicted in the BOTA tarot deck, with the exceptions being Lila's hierophant costume (loosely based upon that of the Rider–Waite tarot deck), Gabrielle's world costume (based upon the universe card of the Golden Dawn tarot deck, which is the equivalent of the world card), and Ares's emperor costume. Ares's emperor costume combines traits from Roman emperors' outfits and the king of wands from the swiss 1JJ tarot deck. Xena's skirt from her 'chariot' costume is taken from the queen of wands from the swiss 1JJ tarot deck, and the other parts of her chariot costume incorporate aspects of Roman legionaries' uniforms. The orange-and-green and orange-yellow-and-green costumes of the people of the village of peace are based upon the clothing depicted in the suit of wands of the Rider–Waite tarot deck.

The black-and-white checkered floor that is shown when Xena is in her BOTA high priestess card costume is taken from the justice card of the Golden Dawn tarot deck. That Golden Dawn justice card is related to the BOTA high priestess card because both cards incorporate the two masonic pillars, and have a person seated between them. The black-and-white checkered floor of the Golden Dawn justice card, like the two pillars, likewise derives from freemasonry. In the hanged man scene, Joxer's position of hanging over water was taken from the hanged man card of the Golden Dawn tarot deck. In the brief moon card scene, there are two rats in the foreground- one white and one brown; that is a reference to the elemental earth trump card of the fiorentine minchiate deck, which has a white rat and a brown rat in the foreground, and is loosely based upon the moon card of the marseille tarot deck. Also, the fortress that is depicted in the moon card scene is based upon the two fortresses that are depicted in the aforementioned earth card. In the village of peace, Gabrielle is given a bouquet of red-orange flowers, which she holds for a while; that is a reference to the strength card of the Golden Dawn tarot deck, in which a blond woman holds a bouquet of red-orange flowers. Inside the echoing temple, Xena and Gabrielle each stand beside a fluted column for a short time; that is a reference to the strength card of the fiorentine minchiate deck, in which a woman sits beside a fluted column. The devil card scene incorporates an element from the lovers card of the Golden Dawn tarot deck- namely, a blond woman who is chained by the wrists to a stone slab. The sun card scene combines the shoreline environment of the sun card of the Golden Dawn tarot deck with the reclining embracing posture of the two people on the sun card of the fiorentine minchiate deck.

== Book of Tokens references ==
In The Book of Tokens by Paul Foster Case, the fool card is associated with the Hebrew letter aleph and the breath of life; the hanged man card is associated with the Hebrew letter mem and water; and the judgement card is associated with the Hebrew letter shin and fire. Those associations are based upon a far older book called the Sefer Yetzirah, which likewise associates aleph with breath, mem with water, and shin with fire. In The Bitter Suite, the fool named Aleph breaths life into Xena, after reciting a passage from the aleph chapter of The Book of Tokens; the hanged man Joxer is introduced by the water that Gabrielle emerges from, after Aleph recites a passage about water from the mem chapter of The Book of Tokens; and the judgement card scene makes much use of fire, including "three tongues of fire", which is a phrase from the shin chapter of The Book of Tokens, and is related to the three-pronged shape of the letter shin. The placement of the two groups of three upward "tongues of fire" in front of the two groups of three risen dead people, is a reference to the judgment card of the Golden Dawn tarot deck, in which the three upward prongs of a large red letter shin are in front of three risen dead people.

A line in the heh/emperor chapter of The Book of Tokens is: "thou shalt see my back parts, but my face shall not be seen", and in The Bitter Suite, Emperor Ares initially has his throne turned around backwards for a while, so that only the back of his throne can be seen, and he himself can not be seen. A line in the daleth/empress chapter of The Book of Tokens is: "therefore is the door a cause of separation, and of the setting of one part against another", and in The Bitter Suite, during the time when Gabrielle is wearing her BOTA tarot empress costume, a mere door separates the village of peace from the lair of warriors, from which Gabrielle and Xena are set against each other. In the zain chapter of The Book of Tokens, the phrase "the path of the sword" is used twice, and in one of those usages, the larger passage is: "the airy spirit of the path of the sword; and this airy spirit is the breath of my angel". In The Bitter Suite, Xena's warriors form a sword-ridden path for her to walk through as she moves toward the door to Gabrielle, and as Xena begins walking through that path, airy vocals begin, and those airy vocals end shortly after Xena finishes walking through the path.

In The Book of Tokens, the temperance card is associated with trial by fire and purification, and in The Bitter Suite's temperance card scene, the wall of falling water tries Gabrielle and Xena, and burns Xena at first because she still hates a dead enemy, but allows her to pass through after she loses that hate. The temperance card scene, which has burning water that falls into a river, which is beside an Eden-like environment, is also a reference to another occult book: The Secret Teachings of All Ages by Manly P. Hall, which mentions an occult doctrine that there is "fiery water" that pours into the rivers of Eden.

== Soundtrack ==
The Bitter Suite: A Musical Odyssey

Soundtrack album by Joseph LoDuca
- Released: March 3, 1998
- Genre: Television soundtrack
- Length: 43:02
- Label: Varèse Sarabande

A soundtrack containing the entire musical score of the episode was released by Varèse Sarabande on March 1, 1998.

All music is composed by Joseph LoDuca.

No.	Title	Lyrics	Performer(s)	Length
1.	"The Sweat Hut/Slapped Out Of It/Xena's In Town"			4:42
2.	"Horrible Drag/On The Edge/Song Of The Fool"			5:09
3.	"What's Still Unwritten... (Song Of Illusia)/Little Ditties/Into The Chandra/Joxer The Mighty/Prepping Gabby"	Pamela Phillips Oland, Stephen L. Sears, Chris Manheim	Michelle Nicastro, Keith Black, Robert Bugar, Gia Warner, Ted Raimi	5:17
4.	"War And Peace/Gab Is Stabbed"	Oland	Kevin Smith, Willa O'Neill, Black, Ron Coden, Judd Mather, Julie Moran, April Arabian Tini, Warner	5:52
5.	"Melt Into Me/Let Go"	Oland	Smith	2:28
6.	"Dead?/Hearts Are Hurting (Part 1)"	Dennis Spiegel	Lucy Lawless, Susan Wood	2:35
7.	"The Deliverer"			4:07
8.	"Hate Is the Star (Son Of The Torment)/Hearts Are Hurting (Part 2)"	Oland, Spiegel	Phil Marcus Esser, Lawless, Wood	5:42
9.	"The Way Out/The Love Of Your Love/Passing Through"	Joseph LoDuca	Lawless	7:10
Total length:				43:02
