= Gotham Girls =

American animated series

- Genre: Comedy drama; Superhero
- Written by: Paul Dini; Hilary Bader
- Starring: Adrienne Barbeau; Arleen Sorkin; Diane Pershing; Tara Strong; Stacie Randall; Jennifer Hale; Bob Hastings; Tom Kenny; Dee Bradley Baker
- Country of origin: United States
- No. of seasons: 3
- No. of episodes: 30 (list of episodes)

Production
- Producers: Jeremy Rosenberg; Ben Stein
- Running time: 2–5 minutes (more with interactive elements)
- Production companies: NoodleSoup Productions; Warner Bros. Animation

Original release
- Network: warnerbros.com
- Release: July 27, 2000 – November 19, 2002

Gotham Girls is an American animated web series focusing on several of the female characters of Gotham City, produced jointly by Warner Bros. Animation and Noodle Soup Productions. The series, which ran from 2000 to 2002, starred Harley Quinn, Poison Ivy, Batgirl, Catwoman, Renee Montoya and Zatanna in short stories of varying length about the daily lives of the characters. It takes place in the DC Animated Universe, with Arleen Sorkin, Diane Pershing, Adrienne Barbeau, Tara Strong, and Bob Hastings reprising their roles from Batman the Animated Series and The New Batman Adventures.

It is also the name of a related comic book series.

== Flash animation series ==
Harley partially drawn for an intended viewing area. Season 1 Episode 1 "The Vault".

Gotham Girls is one of the few series of Flash animations made by a professional publisher of mainstream cartoons, and features professional voice-acting by the same actresses and actors as those who voiced the television series. Its use of Flash (and also vector graphics) enables the animation to appear undistorted and unpixellated at any resolution. However, the episodes do not tend to show the Symbols (the pieces used to create the flash) outside of the intended viewing area. For example, in Season 1 Episode 1 while the light beam on Harley continues off screen, her body is only drawn for the dimensions of the intended viewing area.

Each episode features a mini-game or puzzle which can be played while the clip downloads, as well as an interactive feature which allows viewers to help a character make a certain decision.

Other features of the website include downloadable trailers, screensavers, desktop backgrounds, internet chat buddy icons, as well as biographies of the characters, and an online version of the classic game Othello (aka Reversi) featuring the Gotham Girls. The screensavers, desktop backgrounds and internet chat buddy icon sites, however, no longer work, and simply redirect to the Warner Bros. website, as the Gotham Girls website also does.

The series lasted for three seasons (10 episodes each), with each episode released month-by-month. While the first two seasons featured primarily comedic episodes, the third season attempted to make the show more serious. These episodes linked directly to Batman & Mr. Freeze: SubZero. Dropping the magician Zatanna from its lineup and adding a host of new characters to the cast, including Detective Renee Montoya, each episode from this series tied into the next, forming a collective half-hour whodunit. The storyline also dealt with issues not seen since Batman: The Animated Series, such as the corruption of the Gotham City Police Department, Poison Ivy's environmental crusade and Commissioner Gordon's wavering faith in costumed superheroes. The series takes place in the DC animated universe.

The series finale "Cold Hands, Cold Heart" aired in 2002, wrapping up the mystery and ending the website. The final episode was dedicated to the memory of Hilary J. Bader, script writer for numerous DC Animated series, and who had died in November 7, 2002, of breast cancer.

GothamGirls.com is no longer online, but the individual .swf files were still accessible until mid-2015.

== Series overview ==
Season	Episodes	Originally released	
Season	Episodes	First released	Last released
1	10	July 27, 2000	December 14, 2000
2	10	June 5, 2001	October 9, 2001
3	10	July 16, 2002	November 19, 2002

== Episodes ==
=== Season 1 (2000) ===
No. overall	No. in season	Title	Written by	Original release date
1	1	"The Vault"	Hilary Bader & Paul Dini	July 27, 2000
2	2	"Lap Bat"	Hilary Bader & Paul Dini	August 10, 2000
3	3	"Trick or Trick"	Hilary Bader & Paul Dini	August 24, 2000
Note: This is a two-part episode.
4	4	"A Little Night Magic"	Hilary Bader & Paul Dini	September 7, 2000
5	5	"More Than One Way"	Hilary Bader & Paul Dini	October 5, 2000
6	6	"Precious Birthstones"	Hilary Bader & Paul Dini	September 14, 2000
7	7	"Pave Paradise"	Hilary Bader & Paul Dini	October 19, 2000
8	8	"The Three Babes"	Hilary Bader & Paul Dini	November 16, 2000
9	9	"The Gardener's Apprentice"	Hilary Bader & Paul Dini	November 30, 2000
10	10	"Lady-X"	Hilary Bader & Paul Dini	December 14, 2000

=== Season 2 (2001) ===
No. overall	No. in season	Title	Written by	Original release date
11	1	"Hold That Tiger"	Hilary Bader & Paul Dini	June 5, 2001
12	2	"Miss Un-Congeniality"	Hilary Bader & Paul Dini	June 19, 2001
13	3	"Strategery"	Hilary Bader & Paul Dini	July 3, 2001
14	4	"Baby Boom"	Hilary Bader & Paul Dini	July 17, 2001
15	5	"Cat -n- Mouse -n- Cat -n- Mouse -n-"	Hilary Bader & Paul Dini	July 31, 2001
16	6	"Bat'ing Cleanup"	Hilary Bader & Paul Dini	August 14, 2001
17	7	"Catsitter"	Hilary Bader & Paul Dini	August 28, 2001
18	8	"Gotham Noir"	Hilary Bader & Paul Dini	September 11, 2001
19	9	"Scout's Dis-Honor"	Hilary Bader & Paul Dini	September 25, 2001
20	10	"I'm Badgirl"	Hilary Bader & Paul Dini	October 9, 2001

=== Season 3 (2002) ===
No. overall	No. in season	Title	Written by	Original release date
21	1	"Ms.-ing in Action"	Hilary Bader & Paul Dini	July 16, 2002
22	2	"Gotham in Pink"	Hilary Bader & Paul Dini	July 30, 2002
23	3	"Hear Me Roar"	Hilary Bader & Paul Dini	August 13, 2002
24	4	"Gotham in Blue"	Hilary Bader & Paul Dini	August 27, 2002
25	5	"A Cat in the Hand"	Hilary Bader & Paul Dini	September 10, 2002
26	6	"Jailhouse Wreck"	Hilary Bader & Paul Dini	September 24, 2002
27	7	"Honor Among Thieves"	Hilary Bader & Paul Dini	October 8, 2002
28	8	"No, I'm Batgirl!"	Hilary Bader & Paul Dini	October 22, 2002
29	9	"Signal Fires"	Hilary Bader & Paul Dini	November 5, 2002
30	10	"Cold Hands, Cold Heart"	Hilary Bader & Paul Dini	November 19, 2002
Note: This episode was dedicated to Hilary Bader.

== Cast ==
Catwoman, Poison Ivy, and Harley Quinn, with actresses Adrienne Barbeau, Diane Pershing and Arleen Sorkin reprising their roles from Batman: The Animated Series and The New Batman Adventures.

- Arleen Sorkin – Dr. Harleen Quinzel / Harley Quinn
- Adrienne Barbeau – Selina Kyle / Catwoman, Renee Montoya
- Diane Pershing – Pamela Isley / Poison Ivy
- Tara Strong – Barbara Gordon / Batgirl
- Stacie Randall - Zatanna Zatara
- Jennifer Hale – Dora Smithy, Acting Commissioner Caroline Greenway, Detective Selma Reesedale
- Bob Hastings – Commissioner James Gordon
- Tom Kenny – WGBS Anchor, Rogue Cop, Additional Voices
- Dee Bradley Baker - Additional Voices

== Reception ==
Sayantan Gayen, writing for CBR, praised Gotham Girls for its women-led narrative, humor, and "unique flavor" within the DC Animated Universe. While noting the dated Flash animation, Gayen highlighted the series' strong character dynamics, clever storytelling, and its evolution from lighthearted antics to darker, more ambitious themes in its final season. Despite its short run, the reviewer considers it an underrated gem and a cult favorite among Batman and DC animation fans.

== Release ==
=== Home media ===
The complete Gotham Girls series was included as a bonus feature on the DVD release of the Birds of Prey television series, released by Warner Home Video on July 15, 2008. On the DVD, the animated episodes are presented in a linear fashion, with the interactive, decision-making option omitted.

== Other media ==
=== Comic series ===
DC Comics produced a five-issue Gotham Girls comic book miniseries in 2003, written by Paul Storrie. It starred Poison Ivy, Harley Quinn, Catwoman, Batgirl, with each issue spotlighting one of these characters to a certain degree. The story, which took place in the DC animated universe, involved a vial of chemicals that the three villainesses fought over, as they also tried to avoid capture by Batgirl and Detective Montoya. A three-issue miniseries, Batman: Harley and Ivy, followed the continued adventures of Harley and Ivy.

English version by DC Comics

- Harley Quinn and the Gotham Girls (2012-02-12): includes Gotham Girls #1-5.

French version by Urban Comics

- Gotham Girls: Includes Gotham Girls #1-5, Batgirl Adventures #1-6.
  - 256-page version (ISBN 978-2-36577628-8, 2015-03-13)
  - 184-page version (ISBN 979-10-2682829-7, 2022-08-19)
