= Jack of All Trades (TV series) =

2000 American comedy television series

- Genre: Action comedy Steampunk
- Created by: Eric A. Morris
- Starring: Bruce Campbell; Angela Dotchin; Stuart Devenie; Chris Easley
- Theme music composer: Joseph LoDuca
- Countries of origin: United States; New Zealand
- Original language: English
- No. of seasons: 2
- No. of episodes: 22

Production
- Executive producers: Alex Kurtzman; Roberto Orci; Rob Tapert; Sam Raimi; Bruce Campbell (Note: co-executive producer); Eric Grundemann
- Producer: Janine Dickins
- Production locations: Auckland, New Zealand
- Running time: 22 minutes
- Production companies: Renaissance Pictures; Studios USA Television Distribution

Original release
- Network: Syndication
- Release: January 22 – December 2, 2000

Jack of All Trades is a half-hour-long syndicated action comedy TV series which ran for two seasons in 2000. With Cleopatra 2525, it formed the Back2Back Action Hour and both shows were notable for being the first American non-animated action series to be produced in the half-hour format since the 1970s. The show was canceled in the middle of its second season.

== Plot ==
It is set at the turn of the 19th century (beginning in 1801) on the fictional French-controlled island of Pulau-Pulau in the East Indies. Jack Stiles is an American secret agent sent there by President Jefferson. While there, he meets his British contact and love interest, English spy Emilia Rothschild. Together, the two work to stop Napoleon and various other threats to the United States. To the public, Jack is seen as Emilia's attaché (she sometimes serves as his), and in order to protect his identity as a secret agent, while acting against the enemies of America, Jack often adopts the identity of a legendary (though otherwise fictional) masked hero: "the Daring Dragoon".

The show contained many ongoing gags, such as historical inaccuracies (such as Canada being a French territory rather than part of the British Empire, and Benjamin Franklin being on the 100 dollar bill during his lifetime), Jack being responsible for many important historical events but not receiving credit, Emilia inventing a miraculous invention in an obvious deus ex machina, sexual puns and innuendos, and Jack and Emilia's ongoing romantic tension.

== Cast ==
- Bruce Campbell as Jack Stiles
- Angela Dotchin as Emilia Rothschild
- Stuart Devenie as Governor Croque
- Stephen Papps as Captain Brogard
- Shemp Wooley as the voice of Jean-Claude
- Verne Troyer as Napoleon Bonaparte (recurring guest – 4 episodes)

== Production ==
=== Theme song ===
The tune and lyrics are based on numerous period songs, such as the "Marines' Hymn" and "Yankee Doodle". The theme song was nominated for the "Outstanding Main Theme Title Song" Emmy in 2000, but lost to The West Wing.

=== Historical figures ===
Many episodes of Jack of All Trades involved parodies of historical figures. Furthering the show's inaccuracies, some of these figures died before the show's 1801 time period.

The following is a list of historical figures who appeared on the show:

- Thomas Jefferson (Charles Pierard) 2 episodes
- Blackbeard (Hori Ahipene) 2 episodes
- Benjamin Franklin (John Sumner)
- James Madison (Patrick Smith)
- Napoleon and Josephine Bonaparte (Verne Troyer 4 episodes and Celia Nicholson 1 episode)
- Marquis de Sade (Stuart Devenie)
- Meriwether Lewis and William Clark (Patrick Wilson and Peter Rowley)
- Sacagawea (Vanessa Rare)
- King George III (Mark Hadlow)
- Catherine the Great (Danielle Cormack)
- Leonardo da Vinci is parodied by his fictitious descendant Nardo da Vinci (Michael Hurst).

== Episodes ==
=== Season 1 ===
No. overall	No. in season	Title	Directed by	Written by	Original release date
1	1	"Return of the Dragoon"	Josh Becker	Eric Morris	January 22, 2000
The adventure begins when Jack Stiles is sent by Thomas Jefferson to a tiny island in the East Indies where he teams up with a beautiful British inventor and secret agent to take on Napoleon Bonaparte.
2	2	"Sex and the Single Spy"	Charlie Haskell	Story by : Eric Morris; Teleplay by : Melissa Blake	January 29, 2000
Jack tutors Emilia in the art of seduction, and she then tests her skills on an eminent French spy from whom she must retrieve a secret code.
3	3	"The Floundering Father"	Chris Graves	Roberto Orci & Alex Kurtzman	February 5, 2000
Benjamin Franklin is kidnapped while journeying to France to build a weapon of mass destruction for Napoleon, and Jack and Emilia must come to his rescue.
4	4	"Once You Go Jack..."	Charlie Haskell	Story by : Laurence Walsh; Teleplay by : Eric Morris	February 12, 2000
Kentucky Sue, Jack's former partner and old flame, returns with guns blazing—literally—and proposing marriage.
5	5	"The People's Dragoon"	Josh Becker	Adam Armus & Nora Kay Foster	February 19, 2000
Emilia and Jack, who is disguised as the Dragoon, work together to retrieve a shipment of American gold that has been intercepted by the corrupt Governor Croque.
6	6	"Raging Bully"	Charlie Haskell	Alex Kurtzman & Roberto Orci	February 26, 2000
The stakes are high when Jack must beat Napoleon in a game of poker to win Louisiana back from the French—and save his own life.
7	7	"Daddy Dearest"	Chris Graves	Eric Morris	March 4, 2000
It's all in the family when Emilia's father, who also happens to be Britain's most decorated spy, comes to Pulau Pulau to supervise a mission.
8	8	"One Wedding and an Execution"	Charlie Haskell	Andre & Maria Jacquemetton	March 11, 2000
Jack is determined to save Emilia from saying "I do" after she agrees to marry Napoleon in an attempt to save England from a French invasion.
9	9	"Croque for a Day"	Wayne Rose	Geoff Martin & Josh Kravitz	April 15, 2000
When Napoleon sends an inspector to evaluate Croque, Jack and Emilia scheme to keep the benign governor in office rather than have him replaced by someone who will bring real damage.
10	10	"Dead Woman Walking"	John Laing	Hilary J. Bader	April 22, 2000
When the Dragoon is blamed for the desecration of a cemetery, Emilia plays dead in an effort to clear his name.
11	11	"Love Potion No. 10"	John Laing	David Ransil	April 29, 2000
Hoping to keep the peace on the island, Jack and Emilia help Croque to satisfy his young wife's libido.
12	12	"Up the Creek"	Chris Graves	Kevin Maynard	May 6, 2000
The famed explorers Lewis and Clark, two men who really should just ask for directions, think their deserted island is actually Oregon and can't fathom the idea that the Revolutionary War is over.
13	13	"X Marquis the Spot"	Eric Gruendemann	Timothy A. Jones	May 13, 2000
It's a little bit of pleasure and a whole lot of pain when Jack and Emilia are sent to the Marquis de Sade's island of torture and participate in a leather-clad triathlon in order to retrieve King George's stolen crown.
14	14	"It's a Mad, Mad, Mad, Mad Opera"	Chris Graves	Melissa Blake	May 20, 2000
It's not over until the fat lady sings when Jack and Emilia are assigned to protect the unstable King George from a staged assassination attempt.

=== Season 2 ===
No. overall	No. in season	Title	Directed by	Written by	Original release date
15	1	"A Horse of a Different Color"	Charlie Haskell	Melissa Blake	October 7, 2000
Someone's horsing around with the safety of the island when Katherine the Great threatens to destroy Pulau Pulau unless her champion horse is returned within 24 hours.
16	2	"Shark Bait"	Eric Gruendemann	David Ransil	October 14, 2000
It's all hands on board when Jack and Emilia enlist the help of the legendary pirate Blackbeard to thwart Leonardo Da Vinci's great, great, great, great grandson from destroying the annual Founding Father/Son cruise.
17	3	"Monkey Business"	Chris Graves	Eric Morris	October 28, 2000
A priceless silver monkey by the WallaWalla Bing Bang tribe has Emilia and Jack ape mad at each other when they're both ordered to send it to their respective countries.
18	4	"The Morning After"	Michael Hurst	Roberto Orci & Alex Kurtzman	November 4, 2000
There's a lot of bitter grapes going around when Jack and Emilia wake up in bed together after drinking the "special" wine that Napoleon plans to send to every world leader.
19	5	"Croquey in the Pokey"	Chris Graves	David H. Goodman	November 11, 2000
When the governor is jailed for a planned assassination attempt on Napoleon, it's a battle behind the bars as Jack gets himself sent to prison so he can protect Croque from every thug he's ever sentenced.
20	6	"One, Two, Three, Give Me Lady Liberty"	Michael Hurst	Stephanie C. Meyer & Christopher Beresh	November 18, 2000
Napoleon seems to be turning over a new leaf when he has a special statue sculpted to give to America, but Emilia and Jack soon learn that behind the stone beauty lies a beast.
21	7	"Hamnesia"	Wayne Rose	Eric Morris	November 25, 2000
Emilia goes hog wild when an accident erases her memory, including the location of a priceless land deed, and Jack convinces her that she's really an uninhibited party animal.
22	8	"Seventy Brides for One Brother"	Charlie Haskell	Rick Copp	December 2, 2000
Emilia finds herself one woman among many when she is kidnapped and placed in a sultan's harem, but the longer she stays, the more she refuses to leave without the other "wives."
