= Girls Just Wanna Have Fun (Xena: Warrior Princess) =

- Xena: Warrior Princess episode
- Gabrielle bites Xena
- Episode no.: Season 2 Episode 04
- Directed by: T. J. Scott
- Written by: Adam Armus; Nora Kay Foster
- Production code: V0202
- Original air date: October 21, 1996

Guest appearances
- Ted Raimi (Joxer); Matthew Chamberlain (Orpheus); Anthony Ray Parker (Bacchus)

Episode chronology
← Previous "The Giant Killer"	Next → "Return of Callisto"
- Xena: Warrior Princess (season 2)

"Girls Just Wanna Have Fun" is the fourth episode of the second season of the syndicated television series Xena: Warrior Princess. The 28th episode of the series overall, the episode was written by Adam Armus and Nora Kay Foster, directed by T. J. Scott, and first aired on October 21, 1996. Girls Just Wanna Have Fun is also the title of a multipath adventure game by Slingshot Entertainment which is based upon this episode.

In the episode, Xena and Gabrielle join forces with Joxer and Orpheus to defeat Bacchus, who is transforming innocent girls into bloodsucking bacchae. Gabrielle is turned into a temporary bacchae, and Xena kills Bacchus before he can make the transformation permanent.

"Girls Just Wanna Have Fun" is a comical Halloween episode. It pushes the limits for sexuality on Xena, features disco music, and its artistic style is stylised after rock video horror. The episode also contains a lesbian subtext stronger than the average episode of Xena. Andrew Leonard of Salon said it gives "tacit consent to a lesbian reading of the Xena-Gabrielle relationship." The episode received positive reviews. Critics have commented on its music and special effects, and the supervising sound producer won an award at the Motion Picture Sound Editors' Golden Reel Awards.

== Plot ==
"Girls Just Wanna Have Fun" opens with Xena and Gabrielle running into Joxer, who has a package for Xena. It contains the talking head of Orpheus. Orpheus's head informs Xena that Bacchus has decapitated him, and that he must be stopped. They arrive at a nearby town, and Gabrielle goes to a party and dances with a group of Bacchus's bacchae: female vampires created by Bacchus. Meanwhile, Xena defeats two bacchae. Elsewhere, Bacchus plots to turn Xena into an "eternal bacchae".

The next day the protagonists go to the cemetery next to Bacchus's catacombs to collect dryad bones. These bones are the only thing capable of piercing a bacchae's heart and killing them. Xena kills one of the skeletal, winged dryads and procures a sharp bone. Gabrielle then turns into a bacchae; she had been bitten the previous day at the party. Gabrielle escapes into the catacombs and the group gives chase.

They find Gabrielle, Bacchus, and a large group of bacchae in the middle of a ceremony. Gabrielle is about to drink Bacchus's blood from a cup and become a permanent bacchae, but Xena knocks the cup to the ground with her chakram. A fight ensues and Xena attempts to kill Bacchus, but he informs her that only a bacchae can kill him. Xena lets Gabrielle bite her, becoming a bacchae, and then kills Bacchus, after which all of Bacchus' bacchae servants, as well as Xena and Gabrielle regain their humanity.

== Production ==
"Girls Just Wanna Have Fun" is a comical Halloween episode which was filmed in Auckland, New Zealand. After shooting for two days, director T.J. Scott went to producer Robert Tapert and asked permission to alter the episode's artistic style to stylised rock video horror. Scott said, "I got the crew together and said, 'Okay guys, here we go. This is going to be a lot more vampy and fun,' and cranked up the ghetto blaster with rock music and away we went." Because of the subject, Scott was able to increase the episode's level of sexual content. Scott said, "we did two takes that were on the edge of tasteful vampire sexuality, and we did a third take where Lucy really let loose. Of course, we all died laughing and said, 'Okay, that one is never going to make it to the screen'; we definitely pushed it too far!" Ultimately, Scott felt that "if you pull it too far out of context and try to take it seriously, it's a bit too rock video at times."

In one scene, Orpheus's head is attached to a scarecrow body. According to Matthew Chamberlain, the actor who portrayed Orpheus, he was told to jump on a horse while wearing the scarecrow costume. Chamberlain said he "just gave the horse a quick pat before hopping on" but found himself "getting tugged the other way as the horse was munching away on the straw poking out of the end of my sleeve!" An animatronic version of Chamberlain's head which operated by remote control was used in some scenes. Some of the actors had to only pretend to look at the animatronic head during their scenes, because if they looked at it while it responded, they would laugh and break character.

== Theme ==
"Girls Just Wanna Have Fun" has a lesbian subtext. According to The Audience Studies Reader by Will Brooker and Deborah Jermyn, while in some episodes a lesbian subtext is implied, in "Girls Just Wanna Have Fun" the lesbianism is so strongly suggested that it could be considered "maintext". Andrew Leonard of Salon described the episode as the "disco lesbian vampire" episode and stated that it provided "tacit consent to a lesbian reading of the Xena-Gabrielle relationship." A DVD Town reviewer felt that the general lesbian eroticism in Xena: Warrior Princess was "amped up" in this episode, noting Gabrielle's "sexy clothes" and her looking at Xena with "hungry eyes". Heather Findlay of Girlfriends magazine itemized several scenes with a lesbian subtext. Gabrielle wandering into an all-female bar ("wink-wink"), becoming a vampire ("apparently Friedman studied that topos in her women's studies classes"), and "kissing" Xena ("oh, wait, that was a bite"). The book Queer by Simon Gage, et al. stated that although the series is now canceled, the "lesbian vampire disco" episode lives on in "lesbian video players everywhere."

Due to the strong lesbian subtext within this episode, "Girls Just Wanna Have Fun" was never aired in Italy.

== Reception ==
Reviews for '"Girls Just Wanna Have Fun" were generally positive. Rob Lineberger of DVD Verdict felt that the episode was innovative and strange and that several aspects were notable including: Orpheus's head being paraded around on a scarecrow body; the use of a techno soundtrack; and Gabrielle being seduced by the Bacchae. Ilya of DVDFuture.com gave the episode a grade of B. A Play.com review deemed it a "classic" Xena episode.

Two technical aspects of the episode were singled out for praise. First, a Hollywood Reporter article cited the winged skeletons as one of the television show's special effects highlights. Second, the supervising sound editor Jason Schmid won the one-hour series sound editing award at the Motion Picture Sound Editors' Golden Reel Awards for his work on this episode.

=== Themes and analysis ===
Writer and academic Emily McAvan cites "Girls Just Wanna Have Fun" as showcasing the postmodernism found in the series. She cites the scene of Gabrielle entering nightclub with hip-hop music playing as showing this.
