= The Rheingold =

- Xena: Warrior Princess episode
- Behind-the-scenes picture of Lucy Lawless (Xena) dressed as a Valkyrie. Sergio Non of IGN and Michelle Erica Green both praised the episode for its depiction of "Evil Xena" and the use of Norse mythology.
- Episode no.: Season 6 Episode 7
- Directed by: John Fawcett
- Written by: R. J. Stewart
- Production code: V1408
- Original air date: November 13, 2000

Episode chronology
← Previous "The Abyss"	Next → "The Ring"
- Xena: Warrior Princess (season 6)

"The Rheingold" is the seventh episode of the sixth season of the American fantasy television series Xena: Warrior Princess, and the 119th episode overall. The episode was written by R. J. Stewart and directed by John Fawcett; it first aired on November 13, 2000. The series, set in Ancient Greece, focuses on Xena (Lucy Lawless), a ruthless warrior seeking redemption for her past actions. Throughout her adventures, she is accompanied by her best friend & soulmate Gabrielle (Renee O'Connor), who assists her in recognizing and pursuing the greater good.

In the episode, upon meeting a warrior named Beowulf, Xena decides to travel to the Norselands without Gabrielle to right one of past misdeeds. Deciding to go after her, Gabrielle meets a woman named Brunnhilda who explains the actions Xena took while in the Norselands, which involved meeting Odin and becoming one of his Valkyries.

Upon airing, the episode received positive reviews from critics and alongside its two succeeding episodes, which form the "Ring Trilogy" have often been singled out as one of the best episodes of the show's sixth season. Praise went to Lawless' portrayal of "Evil Xena" during flashbacks as well as the usage of Norse mythology, Beowulf and Das Rheingold. The episode was also nominated for a Primetime Emmy Award for Outstanding Music Composition for a Series.

== Plot ==
In a flashback taking place 35 years ago, Xena is shown crafting a ring and then fighting a monster. Wearing the ring, Xena claims she's invincible but just as she pushes the monster into a cage, it succeeds in taking the ring off of her finger. Xena locks the cage using a lock with two ravens crafted into it and leaves confident that the monster will never get out.

In the present, while Xena and Gabrielle are eating at a tavern, a man from the Norselands named Beowulf shows Xena a broken lock, with the depiction of two ravens in it. Troubled, she keeps quiet to Gabrielle and sneaks away in the morning, leaving a note for her. In the note, Xena implies she is on a suicide mission, warns Gabrielle to stay behind, and ends with a heartfelt farewell. Despite Xena's wishes, Gabrielle sets out to follow her.

As Gabrielle enters the land of the Asgardian gods, she discovers a woman named Brunnhilda, who knows Xena and can share the legends of Xena from the Norselands with Gabrielle. Apparently, on her way back from Chin, Xena came to the Norselands and met Odin. Lusting for power, she became a Valkyrie in his service but tricked him into disclosing the location of the Rheingold, much to the dismay of Grinhilda, who was the leader of the Valkyries before Xena came along. Here, the meaning behind the opening flashback is revealed. The Rheingold is a mystical gold that Xena crafted into a ring to make her invincible. Upon hearing that Xena is moving up the Rhein River in search of the Rhein Maidens and the Rheingold, Grinhilda angrily confronts Odin and takes off with her brigade to stop Xena. A battle ensues, in which Xena kicks Grinhilda unconscious. Back in the present, when Gabrielle mentions Beowulf and the lock, Brunnhilda declares that Xena has embarked on a "suicide mission".

Meanwhile, Xena, hiking along the Rhein River with Beowulf, lapses into a series of flashbacks of her swimming with three Rhein Maidens. Convincing the First Rhein Maiden to take her to the Rheingold, she's led to an underwater cavern where the Maiden points out a box concealing the infamous gold. When the Maiden warns her not to touch it, Xena cruelly tosses her aside, declaring that the Rheingold can do her no harm since she's already forsaken love. Xena melts the gold and molds a powerful ring from it.

Xena and Beowulf approach a house with bloody limbs strewn about the yard. They enter and wait for the beast to emerge. Meanwhile, Brunnhilda briefs Gabrielle on Grindl, the creature Xena locked up more than three decades earlier in the mine. Brunnhilda explains that legend has it that Grindl was once a loving creature, but finally gave up love after such a lengthy imprisonment and was then able to use the power of the ring to escape. Inside the house, Grindl attacks Xena and Beowulf mercilessly.

When Gabrielle and Brunnhilda finally arrive, they find a bloody Beowulf, who sadly tells them that Xena was hauled off by the monster. Gabrielle finds Xena's bloody breastplate.

== Production ==
The 43-minutes, 55-seconds episode was written by R. J. Stewart and directed by John Fawcett.

== Broadcast and release ==
"The Rheingold" was first broadcast on syndication on November 13, 2000. During its original broadcast, the episode received an average audience (AA) Nielsen rating of 3.4. It was the third-most-watched syndicated action drama of the week, behind The X-Files and Andromeda. This marked a continuation in viewership from the previous episode, "The Abyss", which also earned a rating of 3.4.

The episode was first released for home media use on VHS in the United Kingdom as part of a four-episode collection with "Who's Gurkham", "Legacy" and "The Abyss". It was released on DVD as part of the sixth season on March 8, 2005. "The Rheingold" has also been made available on various streaming video on demand services, including Amazon Video, iTunes, and Hulu.

== Reception ==
=== Critical response ===
The episode received generally positive reviews from critics who praised it, along with the next two episodes, as one of the best of the show's sixth season. Sergio Non of IGN stated that "The Rheingold"—along with the rest of "The Ring Trilogy"—was the high point of season six and praised the combination of Beowulf and Das Rheingold being incorporated into the story. Non also reacted favorably to the flashbacks which presented Xena's evil past. Similarly, Don Houston of DVD Talk described the episode and story arc as one of the most notable from season six, praising its thematic value. Andrew Younger of Den of Geek! expressed similar sentiments, describing the trilogy as "epic" and saying that it proved the show could still "dazzle and inspire".

Michelle Erica Green of TrekNation described the episode as "lots of fun". She praised the flashbacks depicting Xena as a villain, saying that she always enjoyees seeing "her seduce, battle, and overshadow the great heroes of mythology", as well as her seduction of the Rhein maidens. Green also praised Lucy Lawless, stating the even without taking the character's wardrobe into consideration, one can always tell when Lawless is playing Xena as a villain solely through her facial expressions. Xenaville gave the episode a score of 9/10 stars.

=== Accolades ===
For this episode, Joseph LoDuca was nominated a Primetime Emmy Award for Outstanding Music Composition for a Series at the 53rd Primetime Emmy Awards but lost to the Star Trek: Voyager episode "Endgame". "The Rheingold", alongside its two succeeding episodes, also won a Bemmie Award (IGN's self-proclaimed equivalent to the Academy Awards) for best episode / story arc of 2000.
