= Eric Gründemann =

German footballer

Personal information
- Date of birth: 8 September 1998 (age 28)
- Place of birth: Magdeburg, Germany
- Height: 1.86 m (6 ft 1 in)
- Position: Goalkeeper

Team information
- Current team: SGV Freiberg
- Number: 22

Youth career
- 2005–2015: FC Magdeburg
- 2015–2017: Eintracht Frankfurt

Senior career*
Years	Team	Apps	(Gls)
2017–2019	Hansa Rostock II	19	(0)
2017–2019	Hansa Rostock	1	(0)
2019–2021	SV Elversberg	4	(0)
2021–2023	VfB Lübeck	30	(0)
2023–	SGV Freiberg	18	(0)
- * Club domestic league appearances and goals as of 29 April 2024

Eric Gründemann (born 8 September 1998) is a German footballer who plays as a goalkeeper for SGV Freiberg.

== Career ==
=== SV Elversberg ===
On 6 June 2019 it was confirmed, that Gründemann had joined SV Elversberg.
