= The Haunting of Amphipolis =

- Xena: Warrior Princess episode
- Behind-the-scenes picture of Renee O'Connor (Gabrielle) inside a water tank, surrounded by stunt performers dressed as ghouls. This scene was filmed without the use of any special effects.
- Episode no.: Season 6 Episode 2
- Directed by: Mark Beesley
- Written by: Edithe Swensen; Joel Metzger
- Teleplay by: Joel Metzger
- Production code: V1401
- Original air date: October 9, 2000

Guest appearances
- Adrienne Wilkinson as Eve; Anthony Ray Parker as Mephistopheles; Darien Takle as Cyrene; Charles Mesure as Michael; Tamati Rice as Raphael

Episode chronology
← Previous "Coming Home"	Next → "Heart of Darkness"
- Xena: Warrior Princess (season 6)

"The Haunting of Amphipolis" is the second episode of the sixth season of the American fantasy television series Xena: Warrior Princess, and the 114th episode overall. The episode was written by Edithe Swenson and Joel Metzger, and directed by Garth Maxwell; it first aired on October 9, 2000. The series, set in Ancient Greece, focuses on Xena (Lucy Lawless), a ruthless warrior seeking redemption for her past actions. Throughout her adventures, she is accompanied by her best friend Gabrielle (Renee O'Connor), who assists her in recognizing and pursuing the greater good.

In the episode, Xena, her daughter Eve (Adrienne Wilkinson), and Gabrielle travel to visit Xena's mother Cyrene (Darien Takle) in Amphipolis, which they realize has become a ghost town. While investigating, Xena discovers Cyrene was accused of being a witch after she started to hear voices and was burned at the stake. The trio also realizes Xena's childhood home is haunted and that the demon Mephistopheles (Anthony Ray Parker) is responsible for the current situation in Amphipolis.

"The Haunting of Amphipolis" was originally written by an unnamed writer who was replaced by Metzger because the dialogue he wrote was unsuitable. When Metzger was hired, the writing staff requested numerous changes to the original script, which featured a murdered man and his daughter. The changes included the addition of Mephistopheles as the main antagonist. According to Metzger, besides focusing on the haunting of Xena's childhood home, the final product bears no resemblance to the original script. Many of the scenes in this episode required the use of special effects and CGI. A scene involving Gabrielle being dragged underwater by ghouls was filmed using only practical effects and stunt performers.

Upon airing, the episode received positive reviews from critics who praised its horror elements and dark tone. Multiple scenes involving Gabrielle's demonic encounters, and Eve being confronted by illusions of her victims were also commended.

== Plot ==
Looking down from the heavens, archangels Michael and Raphael discuss Xena's difficult destiny as she arrives at Amphipolis with Gabrielle and Eve to visit Xena's mother, Cyrene. When they arrive, the trio realize Amphipolis has become a ghost town. In Cyrene's tavern, Eve sees Cyrene's spirit and tells Xena her mother is dead. Xena goes to the mausoleum where she finds Cyrene's sarcophagus, which contains charred remains.

While eating, Eve tells Gabrielle that she feels something terrible is about to occur. Gabrielle's food becomes instantly infested with maggots. Maggots then begin to emerge from Gabrielle's hands and her flesh rots. When Eve prays to Eli to cast out the evil presence, the maggots disappear and Gabrielle's hands are restored. Later, Gabrielle is grabbed by numerous hands and lands in a pool of water filled with ghouls. Hearing her screams, Xena and Eve save her. Eve tells Xena and Gabrielle the demon Mephistopheles is preparing for war, that the tavern is his exit from Hell, and that Eve's presence there is deliberate.

Mephistopheles possesses Gabrielle as she takes a shower. He tells Xena he has kidnapped Cyrene's soul and will not release it unless Eve's blood is spilled because the blood of the Messenger of Eli is necessary for him to escape Hell. Xena refuses and Eve exorcises him. Mephistopheles then torments Eve, reminding her of her bloody past before her redemption. He also joins Xena and Gabrielle's bodies every time they touch. Once Eve separates them, Xena uses the pinch—a skill that allows her to stop blood from flowing—on herself. She visits the spirit realm to defeat Mephistopheles, who tells her whoever kills him must assume his reign over Hell.

After Gabrielle revives Xena, Eve says she is ready to sacrifice herself to stop Mephistopheles. Xena decides to fight him instead, so Eve cuts her palm and spills a few drops of blood. Mephistopheles emerges from a Hellmouth and battles Xena until she kills him. This releases Cyrene's soul, who tells Xena she will always be in her heart. While pondering the consequences of Mephistopheles' death, the trio notice the Hellmouth is starting to release steam.

== Production ==
=== Development and writing ===
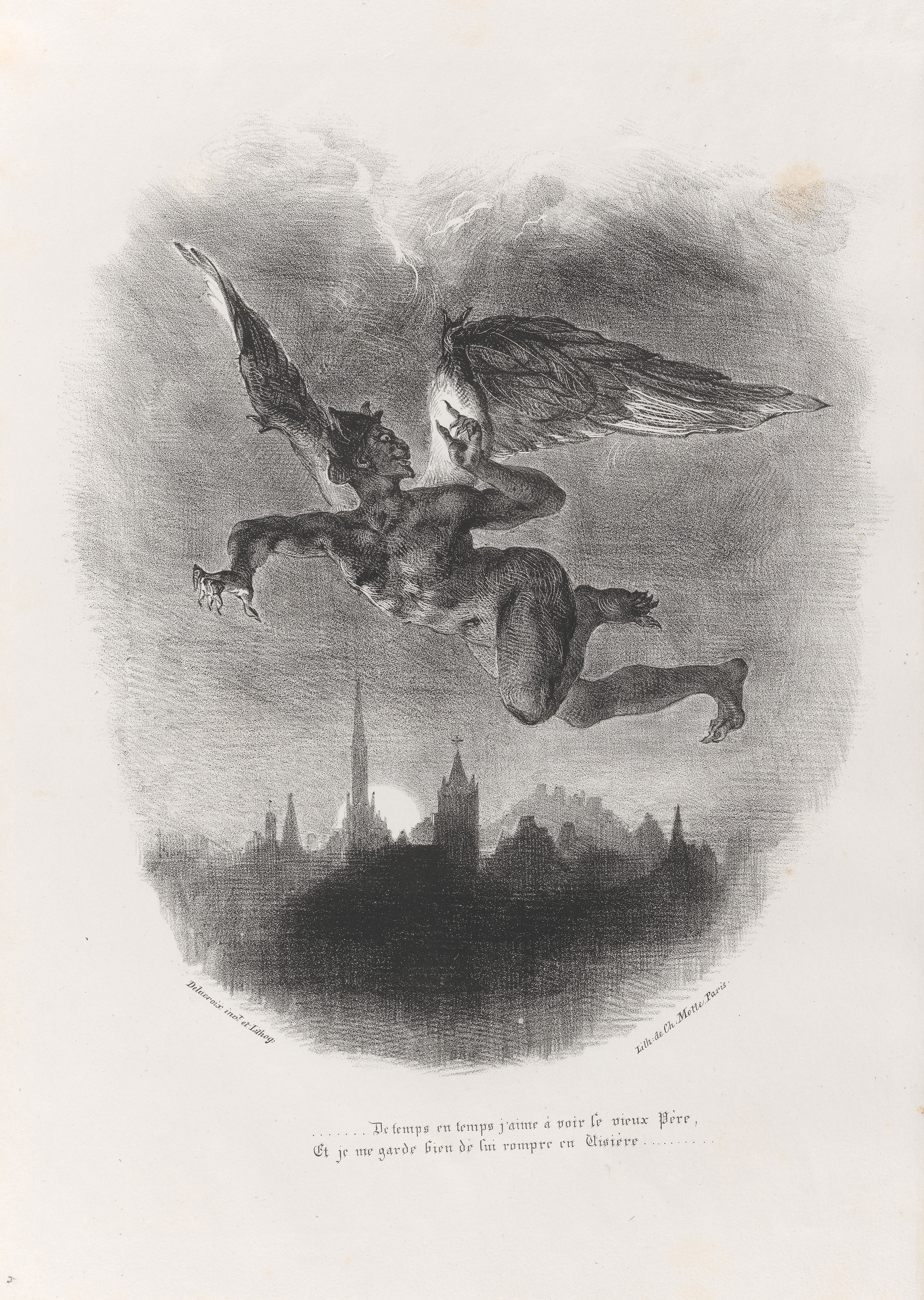
The inclusion of Mephistopheles was mandated by the writers room after Joel Metzger was hired to rewrite the script.

The 44-minute, 23-second episode was written by Edithe Swenson and Joel Metzger, and was directed by Garth Maxwell. According to Metzger, "The Haunting of Amphipolis" was originally written by another writer whom he replaced because the producers felt said writer had not "captured the Xena voices at all". The idea of an episode focused on a haunting at Xena's childhood home came from the writing staff; the original plot of "The Haunting of Amphipolis" included a murdered man who had a daughter.

After handing in his first draft, Metzger—who was a freelancer—was offered a job on the writing staff. At the request of the staff, Metzer added Mephistopheles as the main villain. He included the subplot about Xena's mother being trapped in Hell to make the story "closer to home and [ensure] Xena had a personal stake in it". By the end of the final draft, most of the original plot and scenes had been changed, with only the core concept of Xena's house being haunted remaining.

=== Filming and effects ===
According to Maxwell, the episode is "built around" the use of numerous special effects. He described the experience of directing this episode as challenging, because "things move at their own slightly slower pace". The scene in which Gabrielle is dragged underwater by ghouls does not include any special effects; it was filmed inside a glass water tank on a closed set, enclosed by a curtain for lightning and filming purposes. Inside the water, prop skeletons and "slimy" pieces of fabric were inserted alongside O'Connor and stunt performers portraying the ghouls. The water inside the tank was placed at a level that allowed the actors to stand with their heads above the water, but also allowed the stunt performers to drag O'Connor underwater. The cameras were placed close to the dry side of the glass tank. The water inside the tank was warm to ensure O'Connor and the stunt performers would not get sick. Due to its lack of special effects, Maxwell said this scene was filmed in a very relaxed and spontaneous way.

According to O'Connor, the scene in which Xena and Gabrielle have their arms and legs joined by Mephistopheles, she and Lucy Lawless had a stocking net placed over their arms and the rest was computer-generated. O'Connor described this scene as difficult to film because of the height difference between her and Lawless, and as "quite hilarious" and enjoyable to film.

== Broadcast and release ==
"The Haunting of Amphipolis" was first broadcast on syndication on October 9, 2000. During its original broadcast, the episode received an average audience (AA) Nielsen rating of 2.9. It was the fourth-most-watched syndicated action drama of the week, behind Andromeda, The X-Files, and ER. This marked a drop in viewership from the previous episode, "Coming Home", which earned a rating of 3.3.

The episode was first released for home media use on VHS in the United Kingdom as part of a three-episode collection with "Coming Home" and "Heart of Darkness". It was released on DVD as part of the sixth season on March 8, 2005. "The Haunting of Amphipolis" has also been made available on various streaming video on demand services, including Amazon Video, iTunes, and Hulu.

== Reception ==
Michelle Erica Green, writer for TrekNation, said "The Haunting of Amphipolis" would have made "an excellent Halloween episode" due to its content. She described it as a highly effective, horror-themed episode, praising Eve's encounter with one of her victims and the dragging of Gabrielle underwater by ghouls. Green also considered many scenes in the episode to "pack real power", including those in which Xena hallucinates about her mother blaming her for her brother's death and Eve is confronted by the spirits of children she had killed. Xenaville gave the episode 8/10 stars, describing it as a "very enjoyable and fast paced adventure", giving praise to the use of special effects, the flashback sequences, and Eve's encounters with her victims and Livia. In the book Killing Off the Lesbians: A Symbolic Annihilation on Film and Television, writers Liz Millward, Janice G. Dodd, and Irene Fubara-Manuel single out this episode—specifically, Xena almost replacing Mephistopheles as the ruler of Hell—as one of many examples in the sixth season displaying the show darkening in tone.
