= Hilary Bader =

American screenwriter (1952–2002)

- Born: April 27, 1952; Brooklyn, New York, U.S.
- Died: November 7, 2002 (aged 50); Duarte, California, U.S.
- Education: Stony Brook University
- Spouse: Jay Broad
- Writing career
- Years active: 1990–2002
- Genres: Science fiction, comic books

Hilary Bader (1952–2002) was an American television scriptwriter and comic book writer known for her work on projects in the Batman, Superman, and Star Trek franchises, including Batman Beyond, Superman: The Animated Series, and Star Trek: The Next Generation. She won Emmy Awards for The New Batman/Superman Adventures and Batman Beyond.

Bader was also a writer on the web series Gotham Girls and the author of 38 books for DC Comics.

== Early life and education ==
Hilary Bader was born in Brooklyn, New York on April 27, 1952. She majored in mathematics at the State University of New York at Stony Brook.

== Career ==
During the early 1970s, Bader studied mime in Paris under Jacque Lecoq and Étienne Decroux. She later toured the United States for ten years alongside Edmund Felix, performing African Folk Tales, a story theater play they had co-written.

Bader then moved to Los Angeles, where she worked as an intern for the Writers Guild and a freelance writer for Star Trek: The Next Generation. She went on to write episodes for several science fiction and fantasy television series, including Xena: Warrior Princess, and The Zeta Project, as well as the web series Gotham Girls. She was sometimes credited as Hilary J. Bader.

Bader was nominated for seven Emmy Awards, winning twice, for Batman Beyond and The New Batman/Superman Adventures.

In 1996, Bader wrote for two Star Trek video games, Star Trek: Klingon and Star Trek: Borg.

== Death ==
Bader died of metastasized breast cancer at the City of Hope Medical Center in Duarte, California on November 7, 2002. She was 50 years old. The series finale of Gotham Girls, "Cold Hands, Cold Heart", was dedicated to her memory.

== Filmography ==
- Star Trek: The Next Generation (3 episodes, 1990–1993)
- Lois & Clark: The New Adventures of Superman (1 episode, 1995)
- Star Trek: Voyager (1 episode, 1995)
- Star Trek: Deep Space Nine (4 episodes, 1993–1995)
- Silk Stalkings (1 episode, 1996)
- Xena: Warrior Princess (4 episodes, 1997–1998)
- Batman Beyond: The Movie (1999)
- The New Batman Adventures (24 episodes, 1997–1999)
- Young Hercules (3 episodes, 1998–1999)
- Superman: The Animated Series (48 episodes, 1996–1999)
- Cleopatra 2525 (1 episode, 2000)
- Jack of All Trades (1 episode, 2000)
- Batman Beyond (44 episodes, 1999–2001)
- The Zeta Project (4 episodes, 2001–2002)
- Jackie Chan Adventures (3 episodes, 2001–2002)
- Gotham Girls (30 episodes, 2000–2002)
