= PJ Manney =

American novelist

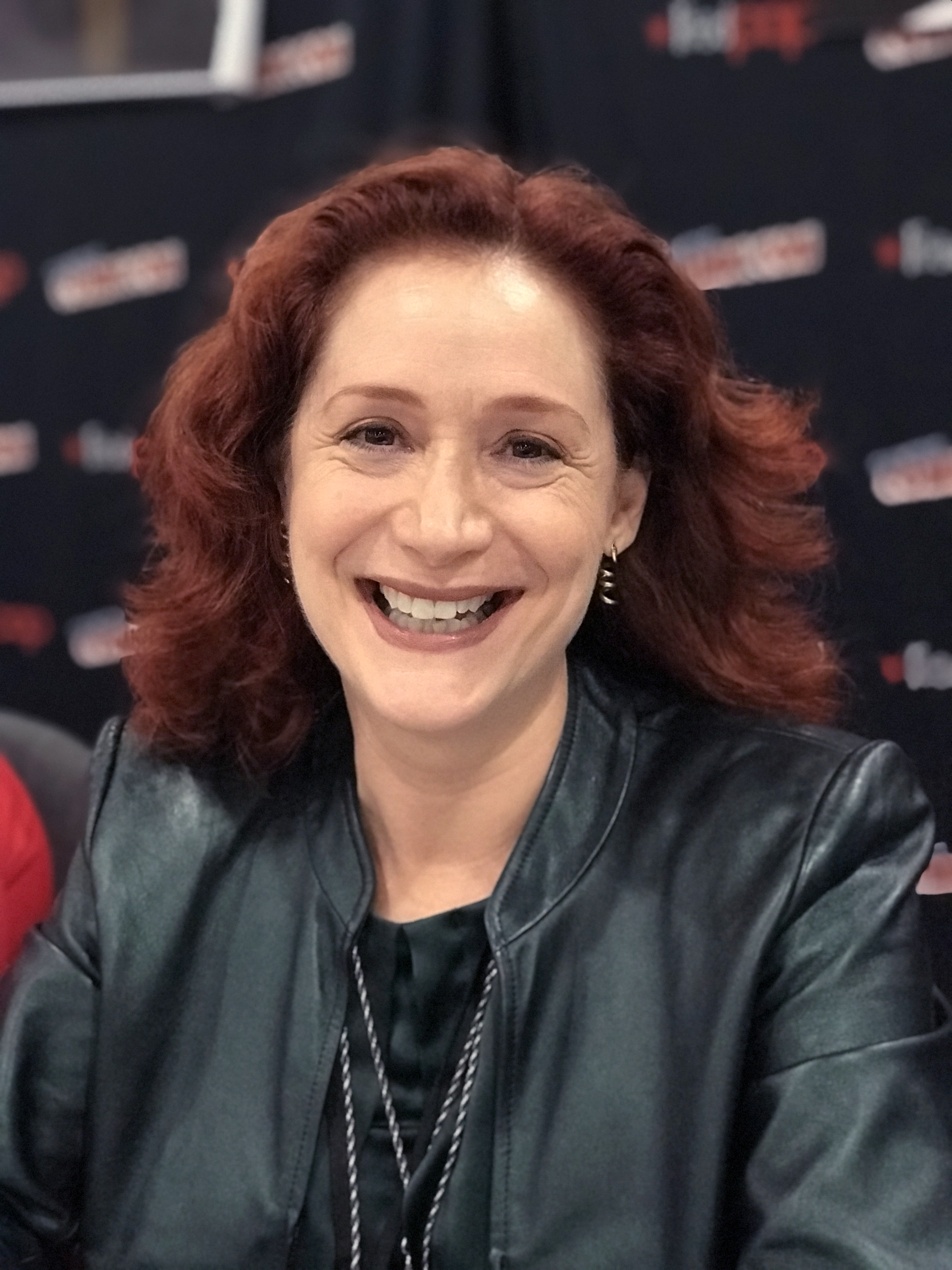
- Manney at the New York Comic Con
- Born: September 29, 1964 (age 61); Sleepy Hollow, New York, U.S.
- Education: Wesleyan University
- Occupations: Author, screenwriter
- Website: www.pjmanney.com

Patricia J. Manney (born September 29, 1964) is an American writer and speaker on humanist and futurist topics. She is the author of (R)EVOLUTION, a near-future techno thriller, which Publishers Weekly called "intriguing" and described it as being written with "poignancy and sensitivity".

== Career ==
Manney started her career in the motion picture publicity office of Walt Disney/Touchstone Pictures. From there she moved into story development, serving as vice president, production and development of Adelson-Baumgarten Productions, who were behind such films as Hook (1991), Universal Soldier (1992), and It Could Happen to You (1994).

Credited as Patricia Manney, she wrote for the TV shows Hercules: The Legendary Journeys and Xena: Warrior Princess.

Manney has been involved for many years in the research and presentation of futurist and humanist topics. She is a former chairperson of Humanity+, helping rebrand the organization, launch H+ Magazine and organize Convergence ’08, the first multi-organization conference on futurist topics. She authored "Why I Believe in Participating in the H+ Future" and "Empathy in the Time of Technology: How Storytelling is the Key to Empathy" (2008), an early academic work on the neuropsychology of empathy and future media.

She is on the advisory board of the Lifeboat Foundation and the Board of Directors of The World Transformed.

Manney has presented her ideas to numerous groups including the Producers Guild of America and Directors Guild of America, NASA–JPL, The Humanity+ Summit and the Institute for Ethics and Emerging Technologies, and is a frequent guest on podcasts including FastForward Radio and The World Transformed.

She has written for and appeared in numerous online and print publications including The Journal of Evolution and Technology, Sentient Developments, and Popular Mechanics.

== Personal life ==
Manney is a graduate of Wesleyan University in Middletown, Connecticut. She lives with her husband and two children in Malibu, California.

== Bibliography ==
- —— (2015). (R)EVOLUTION. 47North. ISBN 978-1477828496.
- —— (2017). (ID)ENTITY. 47North. ISBN 978-1503948495.
- —— (2021). (CON)SCIENCE. 47North. ISBN 978-1503948501.
