= Eric A. Morris =

Eric A. Morris is an assistant professor of city and regional planning, specializing in transportation, at Clemson University, and a former television writer.

Morris grew up in Deerfield, Illinois. He attended Harvard University, where he received an A.B. magna cum laude in history and literature. He also holds an M.A. and a Ph.D. in urban planning from the University of California, Los Angeles.

His television writing credits include Star Trek: Voyager, JAG, Xena: Warrior Princess, The Pretender, and The Outer Limits. He also created the comedy/action series Jack of All Trades.

Morris' primary research foci are transportation, land use and well-being; transportation history; and transportation and disadvantaged populations. In addition to teaching and research at Clemson, Morris writes about transportation for the "Freakonomics" blog.
