= Garth Maxwell =

New Zealand film director

- Born: 1963 (age 62–63); New Zealand
- Occupation: Director

Garth Maxwell (born 1963) is a New Zealand film director.

== Career ==
Maxwell began working in commercial film industry on the 1984 feature Other Halves. During the 1980s, Maxwell had the opportunity to assist Peter Wells and Stewart Main in their editing suite.

He had a big interest in film making, especially when he was in university, where he had made Super 8 films. The third short film he made was called Tandem, a music-heavy short film. It won the GOFTA award for the best short of 1987. In 1988, with funding from TVNZ, Maxwell directed Beyond Gravity, a love story between two men, an astronomy-obsessed Kiwi and a part Italian. This was Maxwell's first gay film. Garth and his co-writer Graham Adams won the best screenplay prize at a French film festival that same year, where they won $13,000.

His first feature film was a drama, Jack Be Nimble, which he made in 1993. The film was about traumatized twins who reunite to find their birth parents after being separated at birth. The film won the award for best screenplay at Portugal’s Fantasporto film festival.

Maxwell was one of the directors on the Xena: Warrior Princess and Hercules: The Legendary Journeys television series. He became one of the more profound Kiwi directors for these television shows. In 1998, Maxwell directed and co-wrote When Love Comes Along. In 2007 he created the TV series Rude Awakenings, directing many of its episodes.

== Filmography ==
- When Love Comes Along (1998)
  - This film is about figuring life out, whether it is finding the type of person you like or moving home from failing in L.A, love comes along.
- Jack Be Nimble (1993)
  - Two twins are abandoned after birth and come together to find their birth parents
- Red Delicious (1991)
- Beyond Gravity (1989)
  - love story between two men, an astronomy obsessed Kiwi and a part-Italian
- Tandem (1986)

== Awards ==
- 1999 Verzaubert Gay and Lesbian Film Festival (Germany) - Nominated for Best Film - When Love Comes Along
- 1994 Fantasporto Festival (Portugal) - Best Screenplay and nominated for Best Film - Jack Be Nimble
- 1988 International Festival of Audio-Visual Films (France) - Best Fiction Script (shared with Graham Adams) - Beyond Gravity
- 1987 Gofta Awards - Best Short Film - Tandem
