= Steven L. Sears =

American writer and producer (born 1957)

- Born: December 23, 1957 (age 68); Fort Gordon, Georgia, U.S.
- Occupations: Writer, producer
- Writing career
- Pen name: Buddy Williers
- Period: 1980s–present
- Website: www.pondalee.com

Steven L. Sears (born December 23, 1957) is an American writer and producer primarily working in television. He is known for writing and co-executive producing the popular series Xena: Warrior Princess, as well as his subsequent creation Sheena, based on the comic book of the same name.

While he initially began his career as an actor, Sears had greater success with his writing and began to pursue it full-time in 1984 (with the series Riptide), accumulating an impressive resume as staff writer, story editor and producer on such shows as Stingray, The A-Team, J.J. Starbuck, The Highwayman, Father Dowling Mysteries, Swamp Thing, and Raven. In addition, he has written for shows such as Hardcastle and McCormick, Superboy, The Hollywood Detective, Jesse Hawkes, Hardball, Grand Slam, and Walker, Texas Ranger. He has also written in the arenas of film, stage, animation and interactive. His prose works include the graphic novel STALAG-X and short stories for Jeff Sturgeon's Last Cities of the Earth and Alien vs. Predator: Ultimate Prey anthologies as well as a collection of short stories entitled Tales of the aboveground / underground and the non-fiction book The non-user-friendly guide for aspiring TV writers.

Steven L. Sears was born into a military family, his father being a career soldier with the U.S. Army. Consequently, Steven traveled quite a bit, his family being rotated out to new assignments every three years. As a result, he had visited 14 countries and 48 U.S. states before the age of 13, when his father retired from the military. After moving to St. Augustine, Florida, Steven became active in the arts programs at St. Augustine High School as well as local productions. His first professional acting work was in "The Cross and the Sword", a symphonic drama which was the official state play of Florida.

Upon graduation, he entered the University of Florida and received his Associate of Arts degree. He then transferred to Florida State University to study in the School of Theatre, then under the direction of Richard G. Fallon. After graduating with a Bachelor of Arts in 1980, Sears moved to Los Angeles to pursue a career in acting but soon discovered he had an affinity for writing.

Partnering with another aspiring writer, Burt Pearl, the two of them began to write scripts "for the fun of it." The producers of the Stephen J. Cannell Productions hit "Riptide" brought them in for an interview. From that meeting, Sears and Pearl got their first assignment. That assignment led to a full-time staff position at Stephen J. Cannell Productions. After working together for several years, Sears and Pearl moved on separately into successful independent careers.

Sears established a scholarship program for undergraduate theatre students at Florida State. He was also honored by the Florida State University Circle of Omicron Delta Kappa as a "Grad Made Good" in 2006. In 2012, he was inducted into the hall of fame at St. Augustine High School, a part of the St. Johns County Center for the Arts. Sears continues his association with aspiring filmmakers and students by occasionally appearing as a guest lecturer at such institutions as UCLA, USC, FSU, UCLB, AFI, and others. He also volunteers his time to the Academy of Television Arts and Sciences for their student Emmys and student internship programs. He is also very active on the internet, having a fairly high profile among fans of his previous series as well as various screenwriting forums.

Still active as a writer and developer of film/TV projects, he returned to the stage in 2019 when asked by Renee O'Connor-Sura to appear in her House of Bards production of Shakespeare's "MacBeth". That was followed by appearances in "Romeo and Juliet," "Midsummer Night's Dream," and "A Doll's House." He appeared as The Trunchbull in the Encore Theatre Group's presentation of "Matilda," also directed by Renee O'Connor-Sura.

Steven L. Sears is married to the author Jessica Brawner and they both currently live in Los Angeles, California.

== Screenwriting ==
- Hardcastle and McCormick (1985)
- Riptide (1985–1986)
- The A-Team (1985–1986)
- Stingray (1987)
- The Highwayman (1988)
- Superboy (1989)
- Hardball (1989)
- Jesse Hawkes (1989)
- Hollywood Detective (1991)
- Swamp Thing (1992–1993)
- Raven (1993)
- The Itsy Bitsy Spider (1994)
- Walker, Texas Ranger (1995)
- Xena: Warrior Princess (1995–1999)
- Sheena (2000–2002)
- She Spies (2003–2004)
- Transformers: Rescue Bots (2014)

== Producer ==
- J.J. Starbuck (1987)
- Swamp Thing (1992-1993)
- Raven (1993)
- Xena: Warrior Princess (1995-2000)
- Sheena (2000-2002)
