= Xena: Warrior Princess in popular culture =

Cultural impact of the American-New Zealand TV series

Xena: Warrior Princess has been referred to as a pop cultural phenomenon and feminist and lesbian icon. The television series, which employed pop culture references as a frequent humorous device, has itself become a frequent pop culture reference in video games, comics and television shows, and has been frequently parodied and spoofed.

Xena: Warrior Princess has been credited by many, including Buffy the Vampire Slayer creator Joss Whedon, with blazing the trail for a new generation of female action heroes such as Buffy, Max of Dark Angel, Sydney Bristow of Alias, and the Bride in Quentin Tarantino's Kill Bill. After serving as Lucy Lawless's stunt double on Xena, stunt woman Zoë E. Bell was recruited to be Uma Thurman's stunt double in Kill Bill. By helping to pave the way for female action heroes in television and film, "Xena" also strengthened the stunt woman profession.

Xena and Gabrielle's relationship (see Influence on the lesbian community) has been cited as one of the reasons why the series has been so popular, coupled with the denials of her character's lesbianism from Lawless while the series was running. Former U.S. Secretary of State Condoleezza Rice was nicknamed "Warrior Princess" by her staff.

== Xena: Warrior Princess in contemporary culture ==
=== Literature ===
One of the running jokes in the Animorphs series of books is Marco's continual comparison of Rachel to Xena, referring to her daredevil nature and her lust for battle.

=== Astronomy ===
In January 2005, the team that discovered the dwarf planet 2003 UB_{313} nicknamed it "Xena" in honor of the TV character. On October 1 the same year, the team announced that 2003 UB_{313} had a moon, which they had nicknamed "Gabrielle". The objects were officially named Eris and Dysnomia by the International Astronomical Union on September 13, 2006. Although the official names have legitimate roots in Greek mythology, Dysnomia is also Greek for "lawlessness", perpetuating the link with Lucy Lawless.

=== Costume donation ===
In 2006, Lucy Lawless donated her personal Xena costume to the Museum of American History. In an interview the same year with Smithsonian, she was asked the question "Was the Warrior Princess outfit comfortable?" and she responded:

Not at first, because they would put boning in the corset. It would cover up those little floating ribs that are so important for breathing, so I'd feel like I was having panic attacks. But it just became a second skin after a while. It was very functional, once I got over the modesty factor. I admit to being a little bit embarrassed the first couple weeks because I'd never worn anything so short.

— Lucy Lawless, Smithsonian, November 2006, page 44

== Fandom and unofficial sequels ==
=== Fan fiction ===
The popularity of Xena has led to websites, online discussion forums, works of Xena fan fiction and several unofficial fan-made productions. Members of the Xena fandom have written numerous fanfiction stories of the series. In January 1998, there were a total of 1.598 works of fan fiction going through the network. The fans have popularized the term altfic to refer to fan fiction about loving relationships between women. Many believe that the term slash refers only to relationships between men and does not truly describe the romantic fan fiction about Xena and Gabrielle; they prefer the term altfic. In honor of Gabrielle, Xena fan fiction writers were dubbed bards.

A special type of Xena fan fiction is Uber, or Uberfic, a term coined in 1997 by Kym Taborn, creator of fan website Whoosh.org. Uberfic are stories in which Xena, Gabrielle, and other characters appear in different cultures and eras, from prehistory to the distant future, through reincarnation or supernatural means. Stories like these began drawing on the episode set in Macedonia, "The Xena Scrolls", featuring descendants of Xena, Gabrielle and Joxer living in the 1940s. Subsequent episodes had the characters appearing in various incarnations in India and the United States.

Once the series ended, several virtual seasons were created by fans and released on the Internet, continuing the plot from the end of the series. These include virtual seasons' subtext. In addition, the series has inspired a variety of fan artwork, ranging from paintings to drawings to computer designs, as well as handmade crafts and cosplay.

=== Influence on the lesbian community ===
Xena has enjoyed a particular cult status in the lesbian community. Some of the lesbian fan base sees Xena and Gabrielle as a couple and has embraced them as role models and lesbian icons. A group called The Marching Xenas has participated in many gay and lesbian pride parades.

A subject of much interest and debate among viewers is the question of whether Xena and Gabrielle are lovers. The issue is left deliberately ambiguous by the writers during most of the show. Jokes, innuendo, and other subtle evidence of a romantic relationship between Xena and Gabrielle is referred to as "lesbian subtext" or simply "subtext" by fans. The issue of the true nature of the Xena/Gabrielle relationship caused intense shipping debates in the fandom, which turned especially impassioned due to spillover from real-life debates about same-sex sexuality and gay rights.

Many fans felt that the sexual nature of Xena and Gabrielle's relationship was cemented by an interview given by Lucy Lawless to Lesbian News magazine in 2003. Lawless stated that after the series finale, where Gabrielle revives Xena with a mouth-to-mouth water transfer filmed to look like a full kiss, she had come to believe that Xena and Gabrielle's relationship was "definitely gay...there was always a 'well, she might be or she might not be' but when there was that drip of water passing between their lips in the very final scene, that cemented it for me. Now it wasn't just that Xena was bisexual and kinda liked her gal pal and they kind of fooled around sometimes, it was 'Nope, they're married, man'."

The Xena fandom also popularized the term Altfic (from "alternative fiction") to refer to same-sex romantic fan fiction. Many fans felt the term slash fiction carried the connotation of being about male/male couples only and was not a good description for romantic fan fiction about Xena and Gabrielle.

==== Shipping wars ====
The Xena: Warrior Princess fandom often saw nasty "shipping wars" that turned especially intense due to spillover from real-life debates about same-sex sexuality and gay rights.

Shortly after its 1995 debut, fans started discussing the possibility of a relationship between Xena and her sidekick and best friend Gabrielle. Toward the end of the first season, the show's writers began to play to this perception by deliberately inserting usually humorous lesbian innuendo into some episodes. The show acquired a cult following in the lesbian community. However, Xena had a number of male love interests as well, and from the first season she had an adversarial but sexually charged dynamic with Ares, the God of War, who frequently tried to win her over as his "Warrior Queen."

In a ten-year retrospective of the show in Salon.com, journalist Cathy Young wrote:

Almost from the start, the fandom was bitterly divided among various factions, particularly subtext fans pitted against those who saw Xena and Gabrielle as friends. Fandom wars over relationships are nothing new: "X-Files" fans clashed vehemently over whether Mulder and Scully should do the deed. In the "Xena" fandom, though, these wars had the added angle of sexual politics. Some of the anti-subtext sentiment was undoubtedly driven by bona fide bigotry. Some lesbian fans, on the other hand, approached the argument as a real-life gay rights struggle and labeled all dissent as homophobic: To them, denying a sexual relationship between Xena and Gabrielle was tantamount to denying the reality of their own lives, and the "Are they or aren't they" tease was an insulting way to keep the characters in the closet. In a way, knowing that the staff paid attention to fan opinions may have made matters worse: There was an incentive for the rival groups to out-shout one another to make themselves heard. Many fans who had no appetite for these wars fled the online fandom. Story lines that were seen as betraying the subtext, particularly the Xena-Ares relationship in the fifth season, were met with intense hostility from a small but vocal group; at other times, non-subtext fans grumbled about what they saw as pandering to the pro-subtext fan base (such as several sixth-season episodes emphasizing Xena and Gabrielle's transcendent bond as soul mates).

In 2000, during the airing of the controversial fifth season, the intensity and sometimes nastiness of the "shipping wars" in the Xena fandom was chronicled (from a non-subtexter's point of view) by Australian artist Nancy Lorenz in an article titled "The Discrimination in the Xenaverse" in the online Xenaverse magazine Whoosh! and the flood of the letters it generated in response.

The wars did not abate after the series ended in 2001. In January 2003, Lucy Lawless, the star of Xena: Warrior Princess, told Lesbian News magazine that after watching the series finale (in which Gabrielle revived Xena with a mouth-to-mouth water transfer filmed to look like a full kiss) she had come to believe that Xena and Gabrielle's relationship was "definitely gay."

In March 2005, one-time Xena screenwriter Katherine Fugate, an outspoken supporter of the Xena/Gabrielle pairing, posted a statement on her website appealing for tolerance in the fandom:

The show existed as it did, when it did. And it enabled many to be empowered on many levels, for many walks of life. So if one definition doesn't work for you, then discard it. If it does, hold it gently. But please, allow everyone the grace to take what they need from the show and make it theirs. Let them have what moved them -- be it that Xena was in love with Gabrielle or Xena was in love with Ares. Please stop the arguing and name calling and need to be right, because in the end, the show worked, it healed, it changed lives, it created new friendships, new loves and new thought, and it was bloody fantastic. And that's what matters. That it simply lived.

== See also ==
- Buffy the Vampire Slayer in popular culture
- List of female action heroes
- Woman warrior
