= Unofficial Buffy the Vampire Slayer productions =

Parodies and tributes

The fictional universe established by television series Buffy the Vampire Slayer and Angel and the film Buffy the Vampire Slayer has been parodied or paid tribute to by a number of unofficial productions, most notably fan films and adult films.

== Fan films ==
Several notable fan films have been inspired by the Buffyverse. Although 20th Century Fox and its licensees are the only organizations legally allowed to create any commercial products with the name and trademark Buffy and Angel, related fan films have become more common, as computer and digital technology has advanced, to allow films to be produced for less money. Furthermore, the growth of the internet has allowed such films a way be distributed amongst a potentially wide audience.

This has led to several productions which have received hundreds of thousands of downloads, an entry on Internet Movie Database, and at least some attention from external media. In 2006, the periodical technology magazine, Wired featured a two-page article about several of these films. These films include Cherub, an internet series that parodies Angel; a machinima series produced by Foiled Productions; Fluffy the English Vampire Slayer, a short film described as "one of the first widely watched Whedonverse fan films"; and Forgotten Memories, an Australian production, written by Emma Paige Langley and directed by indie actor and director Darren K Hawkins. Buffy – The alliance, a French fan film by Lmpp Production was planned for shooting in May 2010.

== Erotic parodies ==
The huge success of the Buffy franchise led to a number of erotic parodies in comic and film formats. None of these stories were licensed by 20th Century Fox as official Buffy merchandise, and none would be considered Buffyverse canon. These parodies have included:

- 1993 - Muffy the Vampire Layer, a pornographic movie spoof of the Buffy film.
- 1997 - Buffy the Vampire Layer, a soft pornographic movie also spoofing the Buffy film.
- 2000–2001 - Boffy the Vampire Layer, a trade paperback from Fantagraphics, collecting sexually explicit comic stories satirising Buffy.
- 2004 - The Erotic Adventures of Buffy and Evil Vampire Willow, an explicit parody web comic focused on the escapades of Buffy and the vampire version of Willow Rosenberg.
- 2012 - Buffy the Vampire Slayer XXX: A Parody, a hardcore pornographic parody film directed by Lee Roy Myers, written by "Josh Wheldon" and starring Lexi Belle as Buffy. Other characters from the television series include Willow Rosenberg, Xander Harris, Rupert Giles, Angel, Spike, Harmony Kendall, and Jenny Calendar.

The 2000 Friends episode "The One Where Chandler Can't Cry" shows a brief scene from the fictional Buffay the Vampire Layer.

== Books ==
In 2007, French author Chloé Delaume wrote the gamebook La nuit je suis Buffy Summers (published by Éditions è®e), which is only loosely associated to the Buffyverse, and stems from the alternate reality shown in the episode "Normal Again". The reader/player takes on the role of an unnamed amnesiac psychiatric hospital patient, who escapes from her cell, is confronted with supernatural surroundings, and is involved in a plot to raise the ghost of Nietzsche's Zarathustra in order to enslave humanity. The characters encountered during the adventure are avatars of the Buffy the Vampire Slayer television series characters.

The author has claimed this is a work of fanfiction. The themes explored are those of the relative nature of reality, psychosis, and the morbid fascination for power of the French literary establishment.

== Podcasts ==
There are a number of Buffy the Vampire Slayer fan podcasts that discuss and analyze the show, including: Buffering the Vampire Slayer (recognized as one of the top podcasts in production by Time and Esquire magazines), Still Pretty, Dusted, The Art of Slaying, Unspoiled!, Buffy Between the Lines, Potential Cast, The Buffy Rewatch, The Rewatcher, and Get Slayed.

== Plays ==
The musical comedy Buffy Revamped is a parody of the television series.

== Canonical and legal issues ==
Director Joss Whedon has implied that materials associated with him are considered "official" and "canon". 20th Century Fox also grants licenses for companies to produce official Buffy and Angel merchandise, these include books, comics, novels, toys and so on.

Buffyverse fan films such as these are not licensed by Fox, and they are not closely associated with any of the crew from Buffy/Angel.

== See also ==
- Parodies of Buffy the Vampire Slayer and Angel
