= Shipping (fandom) =

Relationship created or desired by fans

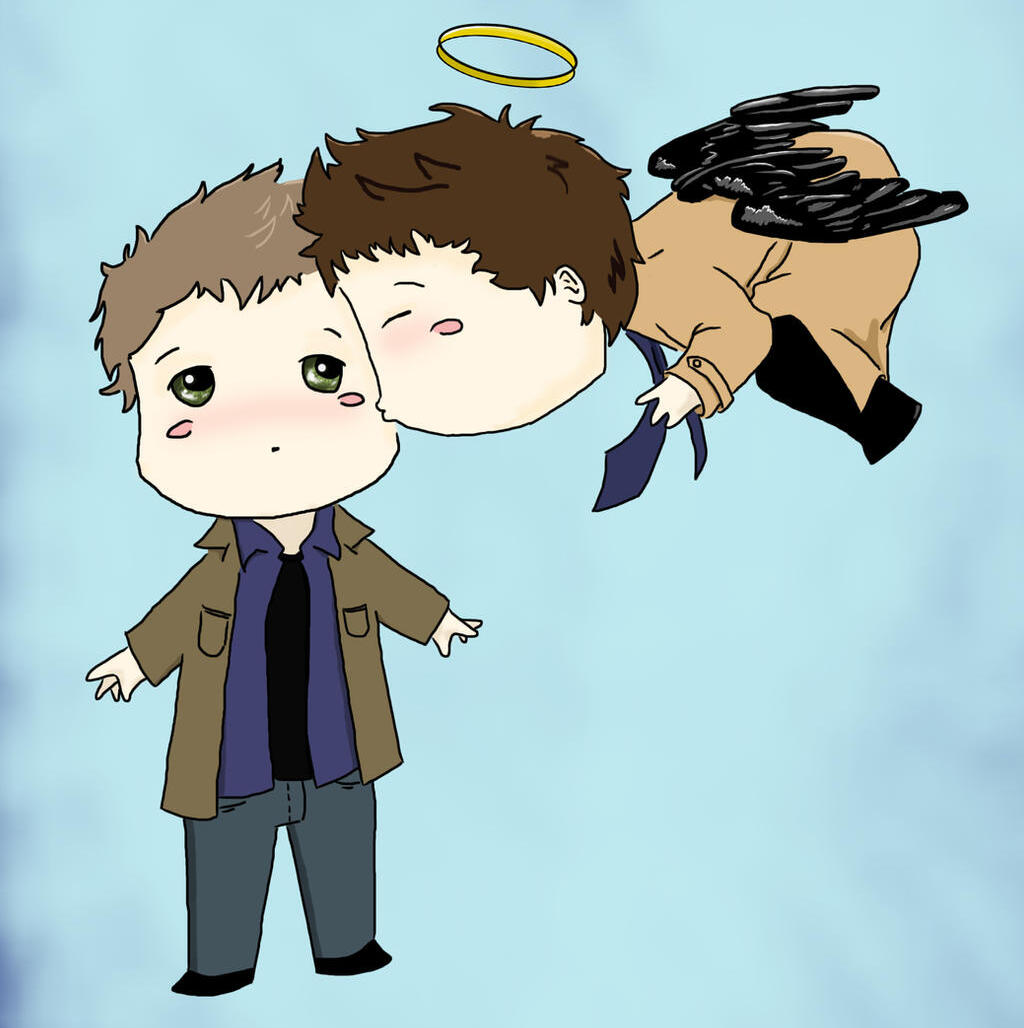
Fan art of Dean Winchester and Castiel from the television series Supernatural, paired together under the portmanteau "Destiel". Members of fandoms often create pieces of fan art depicting fictional characters that they ship in romantic situations.

Shipping (derived from relationship) is the act of imagining, desiring, or expressing interest in a romantic involvement between two or more real or fictional people, usually by a fandom. It often takes the form of unofficial creative works, including fan fiction and fan art.

Shipping may depict pairings that are opposite-sex, same-sex, polyamorous, or love-hate relationships. Interspecies pairings and pairings with large age differences between characters can give rise to shipping discourse related to the ethics of such ships. Shipping can also create conflict within fandoms and between a work's creator(s) and its fans. Notable cases of shipping exist within the fandoms of Harry Potter, Xena: Warrior Princess, Avatar: The Last Airbender, The Legend of Korra, My Little Pony: Friendship Is Magic, and Star Wars.

== Etymology ==
The usage of the term "ship" in its relationship sense appears to have been originated around 1995 by Internet fans of the TV show The X-Files, who believed that the two main characters, Fox Mulder and Dana Scully, should be engaged in a romantic relationship. They called themselves "relationshippers" at first; then "R'shipper", and finally just "shipper".

The oldest recorded uses of the noun ship and the noun shipper, according to the Oxford English Dictionary, date back to 1996 postings on the Usenet group alt.tv.x-files; shipping is first attested slightly later, in 1997 and the verb to ship in 1998.

== Notation and terminology ==
"Ship" and its derivatives in this context have since come to be in widespread usage. "Shipping" refers to the phenomenon; a "ship" is the concept of a fictional couple; to "ship" a couple means to have an affinity for it in one way or another; a "shipper" or a "fangirl/boy" is somebody significantly involved with such an affinity; and a "shipping war" is a dispute between the proponents of different ships. A ship that a particular fan prefers over all others is called an OTP, which stands for one true pairing.

When discussing shipping, a ship that has been confirmed by its series is called a canon ship or sailed ship, whereas a sunk ship is a ship that has been proven unable to exist in canon, or in other words, will never be real nor confirmed.

=== Naming conventions ===
Various naming conventions have developed in different online communities to refer to shipped couples, likely due to the ambiguity and cumbersomeness of the "Character 1 and Character 2" format.

The first method was using a slash, first used for Kirk/Spock, which was described by Merriam-Webster as one of the most-known early ships in media. Today, slash is mainly used to describe same-sex ships with fanfiction with these pairings known as slash fiction.

Name blending is often used to refer to a couple, like "Reylo" for Kylo Ren and Rey in Star Wars franchise, "Destiel" for Dean Winchester and Castiel in the Supernatural TV series, "AppleDash" for Applejack and Rainbow Dash in My Little Pony: Friendship Is Magic, and "Bubbline" referring to Princess Bubblegum and Marceline the Vampire Queen in Adventure Time. Portmanteaus and clipped compounds are used not only to abbreviate character pairings but also to create a name for the ship itself. For example, "Klance" forms a clipped compound, and an abbreviated form of the complete names Keith and Lance in Voltron: Legendary Defender. "Sculder" in this case Dana Scully and Fox Mulder in The X-Files, is an example of surnames being blended, although most X-Files fans use the term "MSR" (Mulder-Scully Relationship), as is "MoonBoon" to stand for Zarya Moonwolf and Kitty Boon in Mysticons. In other cases, first names of characters are merged, like the ships for Marcy Wu and Anne Boonchuy ("Marcanne"), Sasha Waybright and Marcy Wu ("Sasharcy"), and Sasha Waybright and Anne Boonchuy (Sashanne) in Amphibia or between Violet "Vi" and Caitlyn "Cait" Kiramman ("Caitvi" or "CaitVi") in Arcane.

These combinations of names often follow systematic phonological principles, in which the first character in the ship's name is seen as the 'dominant' partner. Japanese ship naming conventions often attach names together without slashing or blending by using an XY name-name format. This format is ruled by boy-girl ordering, or seme-uke (top-bottom) in yaoi. In many East Asian countries there is a distinct difference between the pairing of XY and YX. Such as the pairing names of 'MomoYuki' (where Momo is dominant) vs. "YukiMomo" (where Yuki is dominant) from the series Idolish7.

Many fandom-specific variants exist and often use fandom-specific terminology. These often employ words that describe the relationship between characters in the context of the fictional universe and simply add the word "Shipping" to the end (For example, AmourShipping, LuckyShipping, SpecialShipping, PokeShipping, RocketShipping, and ContestShipping in Pokémon). Other terminology include using a combination of the characters' names and codes as a ship name. For instance, ship names for characters in RWBY include "Bumbleby" (Blake Belladonna and Yang Xiao Long) and "White Rose" (Weiss Schnee and Ruby Rose).

== Types of ships ==
=== Same-sex ===
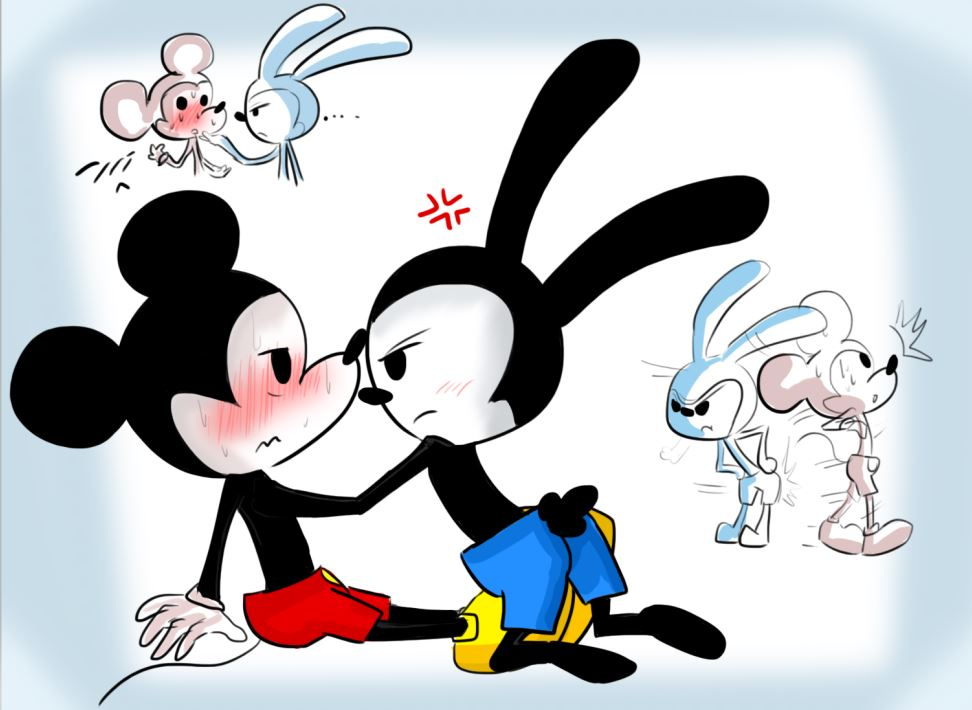
Fan art of Mickey Mouse and Oswald the Lucky Rabbit

Within shipping, same-sex pairings are popular; they are sometimes known as "slash" and "femslash". Within the anime/manga fandom, borrowed Japanese terms such as yaoi and yuri may be used. In the context of Chinese TV series, related same-sex pairings are also referred to as "Tanbi CP". A person who supports same-sex pairings and reads or writes slash fiction may be referred to as a "slasher", although the Japanese term "fujoshi" for women who like same-sex stories, and "fudanshi" as the male equivalent of that, are also commonly used within the community, especially by fans of yaoi (boy on boy) and fans of yuri (girl on girl). In May 2020, She-Ra and the Princesses of Power showrunner ND Stevenson said that while shipping has been a great tool for fans, he does not want films or shows with just occasional glances between characters, or with same-sex relationships, to be portrayed as shipping.

==== Male slash ====
The term "slash" predates the use of shipping by at least some 20 years. It was originally coined as a term to describe a pairing of Kirk and Spock of Star Trek, Kirk/Spock (or "K/S"; sometimes spoken "Kirk-slash-Spock", whence "slash") homosexual fan fiction. According to Joan Marie Verba, the Kirk/Spock ship became a "very popular theme in Star Trek fanzines" beginning in 1975, with some writers saying that if someone didn't enjoy the story, they didn't "properly understand it." In contrast, Lucasfilm actively discouraged stories "showing same-sex relationships between the major characters," with such stories remaining "underground" as a result.

Other early slash pairings came from characters in Starsky & Hutch and Dirty Harry." For a time in the late 1970s and early 1980s, "K/S" was used to describe such fan fiction, regardless of whether or not they were related to Star Trek, and eventually "slash" became a universal term to describe all homosexual-themed fan works. It now refers to a genre of fan fiction that focuses on romantic or sexual relationships between fictional characters of the same sex. Even so, the slash mark itself is a shorthand label for a romantic relationship, regardless of whether the pairing is heterosexual or homosexual, romantic, or erotic.

The first K/S stories were not immediately accepted by all Star Trek fans. Early slash fans in England feared that they would be arrested, because slash violated the obscenity laws there at the time. Many early slash stories were based on a pairing of two close friends, a "hero dyad", or "One True Pairing", such as Kirk/Spock or Starsky/Hutch; conversely, a classic pairing between foils was that of Blake/Avon from Blake's 7. With the advent of the Internet, slash fiction writers created mailing lists (which gradually took the place of amateur press associations), and websites such as FanFiction.Net (which gradually started taking the place of zines). With the Internet, the number of fandoms represented increased dramatically, especially those devoted to science fiction, fantasy, and police dramas. The Internet also increased the level of reader interaction, making it easier for fans to comment on stories, give episode reviews, and discuss comment on trends in slash fandom itself. Websites and fanzines dedicated to fans of The X-Files, Stargate, Harry Potter, and Buffy the Vampire Slayer became common, with tens of thousands of slash stories available.

Some fans of the original Star Wars trilogy shipped Han and Lando Calrissian ("HanLando" or "Han/Lando"), Han and Chewbacca, or Han and Luke ("Skysolo"). The prequel trilogy spawned additional ships, including between Obi-Wan/Anakin, known as "Obikin." Some fans described the pairing of Obi-Wan and Anakin as a "star-crossed bromance," a "love story", or a "deeply broken relationship" between a master and padawan. In a GQ interview, Ewan McGregor who plays Obi-Wan in the prequel trilogy, and in the stand-alone Obi-Wan series, said that a "lot of homoerotic" Obikin art was sent to him, calling it "a bit of an eye-opener" and expressed surprise at how it is sent his way. Others paired Obi-Wan and his clone commander, Cody, as "Codywan," becoming more relevant with the franchise focus on "The Clone Wars", Obi-Wan and Padme ("Obidala"), and Obi-Wan and Qui-Gon Jinn ("Qui-Gonbi").

The sequel trilogy spurned additional ships, such as Din Djarin and Luke Skywalker ("Dinluke"). Later, the Stormpilot ship, also known as "FinnPoe", "Star Husbands," "General Husbands", or "Pinn", of Finn and Poe Dameron, also remained popular, especially among fans "eager for queer representation" in the franchise and others who saw them as a good pair. There was disappointment among these fans that the ship did not become canon.

==== Femslash ====
Due to the lack of canonical homosexual relationships in source media at the time that slash fiction began to emerge, some came to see slash fiction stories as being exclusively outside their respective canons and held that the term "slash fiction" applies only when the characters' same-sex romantic or erotic relationship about which an author writes is not part of the source's canon and that fan fiction about canonical same-sex relationships is therefore not slash. Femslash, a subgenre of slash fiction which focuses on romantic or sexual relationships between female fictional characters, on the other hand, centers upon characters who are typically heterosexual (or of unclear or ambiguous sexual orientation) in the canon universe, but when fiction focuses on lesbian characters, the stories are often labeled as femslash for convenience. Original slash stories are those that contain male/male content, based on perceived homoerotic subtext between fictitious characters. This can be sourced from a variety of media content, such as manga, TV shows, movies and books amongst others. These works are now generally published online and use the same forms of rating, warnings and terminology that is commonly used by slash writers.

Within the brony fandom, for My Little Pony: Friendship Is Magic, homosexual relationships in fan fiction are colloquially termed "fillyfooling" for mare-to-mare relationships and "coltcuddling" for stallion-to-stallion relationships. As My Little Pony: Friendship Is Magic mostly consists of female characters, lesbian stories constitute a significant portion of romantic fanfiction on Fimfiction; lesbian relationships equal or outnumber heterosexual pairings. Unlike traditional slash fiction which typically focuses on male-male relationships, My Little Pony slash fiction predominantly features female characters. These stories generally emphasize emotional compatibility and character development over explicit content (clopfics). According to LGBTQ magazine Autostraddle, fans cite personality dynamics and shared interests as motivations for their favorite pairings. Despite this, there is a documented "double standard", where male/male homosexual stories receive less community support and are downvoted immediately by fan fiction readers without even reading the story.

The Star Wars sequel trilogy spurned additional ships, such as Rey and Rose Tico ("ReyRose"), and Amilyn Holdo and Leia ("Amileia") After the premiere of the television series Ahsoka, some fans shipped Sabine Wren's character with Shin Hati or with Ahsoka Tano ("Sokabine"). Other fans shipped Vel and Cinta in the series Andor ("Valcinta"), which became canon, and Ahsoka and Barriss Offee, among other ships.

The ship between Korra and Asami Sato in Legend of Korra, known as "Korrasami" and canonized in the series finale, would later be compared to other ships between female characters in Arcane (Caitlyn Kiramman and Vi) and Tomb Raider: The Legend of Lara Croft (Lara Croft and Camilla Roth). E.B. Hutchins, for Comics Beat, would later say that Korrsami, like Bubbline, the ship name for Marceline the Vampire Queen and Princess Bubblegum in the Adventure Time franchise, had kept the fandom going, and was an example of having a headcanon which made it "to the screen," calling the canonization of both ships a "landmark in queer representation on television."

=== Polyamorous ===
Love triangles are commonly used as a plot device to cause conflict in the story. The easy way around this for shippers is to pair all three together, or one member with both potential romantic partners. This is not to be confused with a harem, which is usually just a single character being sought out by many others. Situations such as that may be the one to cause a polyamorous relationship or characters may be in such a relationship. Polyamory is not always caused by love triangles, but those that don't tend to be less accepted by the fandom. In some fan fictions, characters are given a polyamorous identity, including a warning to "poly readers that the central characters are monogamous."

An early draft of The Empire Strikes Back, written by Leigh Brackett, included "a lot more romance between the pair" of Luke and Leia. There was also a deleted scene has Luke trying to confess his feelings for Leia and early Star Wars comics have Luke and Leia kissing one another. The love triangle between Luke, Leia, and Han Solo was abandoned in Return of the Jedi, which retconned the relationship between Luke and Leia.

The polyamorous ship of the three protagonists of KPop Demon Hunters, Mira, Zoey, and Rumi, became popular among fans. Named "Polytrix" after the band name of "Huntrix", it spawned fanart and fanfiction, with PinkNews stating, in July 2025, that there had been "fan art receiving tens-of-thousands of likes on social media" and the ship had amassed "nearly 500 fics on the Mira/Rumi/Zoey tag on Archive of Our Own (AO3), whilst Jinu/Rumi is leading with just shy of 1000."

=== Interspecies ===
Interspecies shipping is usually displayed in fandoms of media consisting of animals of various species or supernatural, mechanical, extraterrestrial, and fantasy beings. Shipping a human character with an animal or furry character can be controversial and has been accused of treading a contentious line with bestiality.

=== Age difference ===
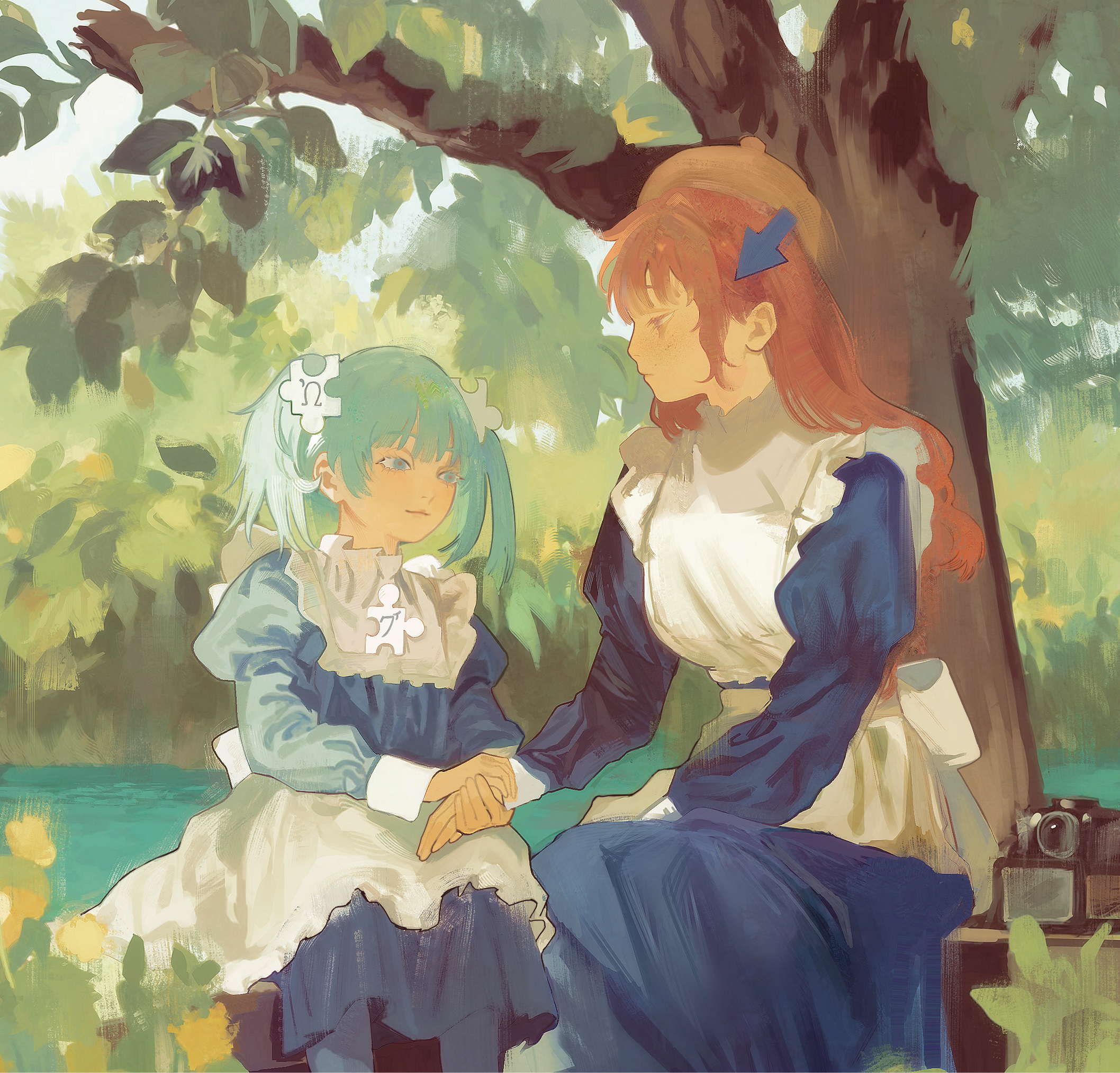
Wikipe-tan and an adult Commons-tan, unofficial moe mascots of Wikipedia and Wikimedia Commons respectively, sitting together in a romantic subtext. Such significant age gaps in fan works have been subject to shipping discourse.

Controversial age differences have a wide range. An elderly adult with a young adult, anyone with an immortal or slowly aging being, teenagers with young adults, or even ships involving fictional children are all part of this category. Connected to this are continued arguments about which ships are "best" and "right," with inevitable "shipping wars".

The relationship of Anakin Skywalker and Padme Amidala, known as "Anidala",, was canonized in Attack of the Clones (2002), their relationship remained controversial due to an age difference, with some calling it "doomed" from the beginning. Others noted the relationship between Padme and Anakin had a "bigger purpose" in the franchise, or defended the romance from criticism.

=== Incestual ===
Some fans ship characters who are siblings of one another, in incestual relationships, comprising characters of varying ages.

In Star Wars, one of the first pairings that some fans gravitated toward was Luke Skywalker and Leia Organa, also known as Luke/Leia or L/L, rather than male slash pairings. Romantic subtext between Leia and Luke was hinted in the 1978 tie-in novel Splinter of the Mind's Eye by Alan Dean Foster. This pairing was shown to be incestual in Return of the Jedi (1983), in which it was revealed that Leia and Luke were siblings. Mark Hamill, who played Luke Skywalker, later said on social media that he found it "weird" and "disturbing" that Leia "passionately" kissed Luke in The Empire Strikes Back (1980), after it was revealed that Luke and Leia were twins.

Additionally, an original and unpublished version of Star Wars Infinities also made Luke and Leia a couple. Some fans called the kiss between Luke and Leia "a bit awkward" and said that the sibling relationship between Luke and Leia was "much more comfortable" than a Han-Leia-Luke love triangle.

=== Love–hate ===
Romances between two characters who canonically hate each other also occur. It is often interpreted that the characters share sexual tension between each other, having a love–hate relationship. An example would be pairing Daniel LaRusso and his bully and rival Johnny from The Karate Kid and Cobra Kai. This is one of the most popular types of shipping.

=== Male-female ===
In an article analyzing the Josh/Donna (J/D) relationship in The West Wing, Rebecca Williams noted the satisfaction of fans seeing the relationship becoming canon, and those who opposed this ship calling it "not proper" or "wrong", that shipping may function as a "way for (primarily) female fans to display levels of attraction to both male and female characters," and pointing to staff members who leaned into the J/D ship when talking about the series, leading the ship's supporters to believe they had influenced the show. Williams also described reasoning for fans in supporting the J/D ship and relationship, with Williams saying that shipping can occur "within a liminal space between admiration and desire, in which identification with female characters must be counterpoised with an affirmation of (assumed) heterosexuality."

Additionally, for Avatar: The Last Airbender some fans shipped male and female characters together, with shipping names such as Sukka (Sokka/Suki), Maiko (Mai/Zuko), Rozin (Roku/Sozin), Zukka (Zuko/Sokka), Yukka (Sokka/Yue), Mai Lee (Mai/Ty Lee), Taang (Toph/Aang), Zukki (Zuko/Sokka/Suki), and Azutara (Azula/Katara), For Legend of Korra, which was set in the same universe, some of the popular ships among fans included Borra (Bolin and Korra), Wuko (Mako and Prince Wu), Kyalin (Kya and Lin), and Korpal (Korra and Opal). The ship of Kai and Jinora was described as "wholesome" along with nine other canon ships between characters in the series.

Star Wars spawned many male-female ships. For instance, the ship between Han and Leia, known as "Scoundress", "Heia", and "Hanleia", would be canonized in Return of the Jedi. The sequel trilogy spurned other ships, including Kylux, the ship name of Kylo Ren and Armitage Hux, and Kylo Ren and Rose Tico ("Darkrose"). After Ahsoka premiered, some fans shipped Sabine Wren with Ezra Bridger, named "Sabezra" by fans, which was popular among Star Wars Rebels fans, Other Star Wars fans shipped Qi'ra, from Solo: A Star Wars Story (2018), and Han Solo.

Some reviewers have described the male-female ship between Zuko and Katara in Avatar: The Last Airbender as "one of the most popular" ships within the show's fandom, and having the potential to be the "perfect execution of the enemies-to-lovers trope" by fans.

== Shipping discourse ==
=== Fandom communities ===
Fans of specific ships have often created fanart and fanfiction. Xena: Warrior Princess spawned various websites, online discussion forums, works of Xena fan fiction and several unofficial fan-made productions, with members of the fandom writing numerous fanfiction stories of the series, numbering in the thousands, and popularized the term altfic to refer to fanfiction about loving relationships between women. In addition, although Kataang became the canon ship in Avatar: The Last Airbender, "heavily disappointing" Zutara fans, the latter made fanart and fanfiction for the ship, arguing why they preferred this ship, with Rincke de Bont stating that the series creators, Bryan Konietzko and Michael DiMartino even picked up on this phenomenon "within the fandom". de Bont added that on FanFiction.Net, Zutara stories became more popular because they "fulfill the wishes" not possible with the original series.

Clare McBride of Syfy described the shipping wars between those who liked Harmione and Romione, calling them the "Harmony Wars", saying they began in 1999 and 2000, and that "tension between these two factions ran hot", with specific communities and fansites for each ship. In addition, English studies scholars Rukmini Pande and Swati Moitra described Korrasami as one of the "only popular nonwhite couples occupying a primary position in an English-language fandom," which is primarily based on Tumblr, and pointed to issues such as fanart which lightened Korra's skin or whitewashed Asami's "cultural specificity."

Later, shippers of Finn and Poe Dameron were fueled by "article summaries," fanfictions, fanart, and other postings, on sites such as Tumblr, Archive of Our Own, and elsewhere, with the subtext between the characters becoming a "widely accepted interpretation" of The Force Awakens. Some also reported that some anti-Reylo fans, in the Star Wars community, created "tight-knight and outspoken" fan communities on Tumblr, Twitter, Reddit, and Archive of Our Own.

Some describe Creek, the romantic pairing of South Park characters Tweek Tweak and Craig Tucker, two elementary-school aged boys, as an example of yaoi that was later canonized. Tweek and Craig were originally depicted as enemies in the season 3 episode "Tweek vs. Craig"; shippers drew fan-art of the two, which was used by the show when the ship was made canon in the season 19 episode "Tweek x Craig".

=== Shipping debates ===
Various fandoms have been divided by tense shipping among fans, sometimes turning into "wars" among fans, including those within the Star Wars, Xena: Warrior Princess, Harry Potter, Avatar: The Last Airbender, and The Legend of Korra fandoms. For instance, there have been shipping debates within the Star Wars fandom since the original film's release in 1977. At one point, some fans made unverified claims that George Lucas attempted to "restrict Star Wars fan work" after reading erotic slash fiction. Within the fandom, some fans have review bombed and doxxed those who have shared critical thoughts about a certain aspect or shipping culture of the fandom itself.

The action/fantasy TV series Xena: Warrior Princess produced "shipping wars," with spillover from real-world debates about homosexuality and gay rights. Shortly after the series' debut, fans started discussing the possibility of a relationship between Xena and her sidekick and best friend Gabrielle. According to journalist Cathy Young, the quarrel between fans about a relationship between Xena and Gabrielle had a sociopolitical angle, in which some on the anti-relationship side were "undoubtedly driven by bona fide bigotry", while some on the pro-relationship side were lesbians who "approached the argument as a real-life gay rights struggle" in which "denying a sexual relationship between Xena and Gabrielle was tantamount to denying the reality of their own lives". She argued that the fact that staff paid attention to fan opinions may have led to problems, with an "incentive for the rival groups to out-shout one another to make themselves heard," leading to shipping wars. In 2000, during the airing of the fifth season, the intensity of the "shipping wars" was chronicled (from a non-subtexter's point of view) in an article titled "The Discrimination in the Xenaverse" in the online Xena fan magazine Whoosh!, and numerous letters in response.

When Avatar: The Last Airbender ran on Nickelodeon, from 2005 to 2008, fans supported various different ships, but the main contention was between fans of Kataang (Katara and Aang) and Zutara (Zuko and Katara). Some reviewers said that Kataang fans are "blinded by their appreciation" for the ship, stated that both ships "have validity...and textual evidence", or described Kataang as "always meant to be." Teen Vogue noted the series had one of "the biggest" shipping wars between Zutara and Kataang, during the series original run, and stated that the shipping debate "continues to this day" among some online users. TheGamer described the shipping wars between these fans as "crazy" and "quite a big deal," noting that writers toyed with making Zuko and Katara a couple originally, and added that shippers of the latter can take "some comfort that their ship almost happened." Some reviewers noted that the live-action adaptation renewed shipping debate between fans of both ships, including by social media users responding to a Netflix post saying Zuko and Katara make "a good couple."

The most contentious ship debates within the Harry Potter fandom came from supporters of various potential pairings: "Romione" (Hermione Granger and Ron Weasley), "Harmione" (Harry Potter and Hermione Granger), "Hinny" (Harry Potter and Ginny Weasley), "Drarry" (Harry Potter and Draco Malfoy), "Dramione" (Hermione Granger and Draco Malfoy) "Snily" (Lily Evans and Severus Snape), and "Wolfstar" (Remus Lupin and Sirius Black), Later, "Harmione" came to be known as "HMS Harmony" by fans.

Throughout the run of The Legend of Korra, there were shipping debates between those who supported various pairings, within the show's "passionate fanbase", including between those who supported Makorra (Mako and Korra), and Masami (Mako and Asami Sato) and later between fans of Makorra and Korrasami (Korra and Asami Sato) after the end of the first season. Following the series finale, some accused the series creators of "fan service" for making Korrasami canon, but others noted that the Korrasami ship was seeded throughout the series run, and said that it was greeted by queer fans enthusiastically, and argued that many of the show's fans were pushing for the pairing.

The Star Wars sequel trilogy, consisting of The Force Awakens (2015), The Last Jedi (2017), and The Rise of Skywalker (2019), sparked renewed fan discourse. This centered around three ships: Reylo (Rey and Kylo Ren), Finnrey (Finn and Rey), and Stormpilot (Finn and Poe Dameron). Of these ships, Reylo became a subject of shipping wars, with some forming an anti-Reylo grouping, calling the ship "toxic", "manipulative", or "polarizing," while others were committed to the pairing. These fans read certain details from official media, actors playing characters in the trilogy, and related media, to "prove" their ship as valid. Some observers were surprised that the ship became very popular considering the "number of parallel pairings". Others, like Alan Dean Foster, said that in the sequel trilogy, the FinnRey pairing was supposed to be canonized, but that this was invalidated in The Rise of Skywalker.

=== Responses by series creators, cast, and crew ===
There have been a variety of responses of series creators to shipping among fanbases of their shows. Some responded positively, while others have been dismissive. With no new material from the show itself, the debates among Xena: Warrior Princess fans were fueled by various statements from the cast and crew. In January 2003, Xena star Lucy Lawless told Lesbian News magazine that after watching the finale, she had come to believe that Xena and Gabrielle's relationship was "definitely gay". In March 2005, one-time Xena screenwriter Katherine Fugate, an outspoken supporter of the Xena/Gabrielle pairing, posted a statement on her website appealing for tolerance in the fandom, telling people to "allow everyone the grace to take what they need from the show and make it theirs," whether they see Xena with Gabrielle, or Xena with Ares.

Author J.K. Rowling appeared to refute the first possibility of the "Harmione" ship, before the debates began following the release of Goblet of Fire in July 2000, when she stated in October 1999 that Harry and Hermione "are very platonic friends" after the release of Prisoner of Azkaban in July 1999. An interview with Rowling shortly after the release of Half-Blood Prince in 2005 caused significant controversy within the fandom. An interviewer stated that Harmione fans were delusional, to which Rowling responded that they were "still valued members of her readership", but that there had been "anvil-sized hints" for future Romione and Hinny relationships incorporated in the book itself, and that Harmione shippers needed to re-read the books. This caused an uproar among Harmione shippers, some of whom claimed they would return their copies of Half-Blood Prince and boycott future books. Clare McBride said that the 2005 interview in which MuggleNet's Emerson Spartz stated that "Harry/Hermione shippers" were "delusional" led Harmione fans to "openly insult Rowling" and stated that this moment gave birth to shipping that "only values a ship for whether or not it wins, not whether or not it is enjoyable."

Rowling's attitude towards shipping has varied between amused and bewildered to frustrated. In that same interview, she stated that she was a "relative newcomer to the world of shipping" and that it was "extraordinary" to meet the shippers, calling it a "huge underworld" seething beneath her. In an interview conducted by Emma Watson (who portrays Hermione in the films) in February 2014 for Wonderland magazine, she stated that realistically Hermione and Ron had "too much fundamental incompatibility," that they were written together "as a form of wish fulfillment" to reconcile a relationship she herself was once in. She admitted to thinking she could have paired Hermione with Harry: "in some ways Hermione and Harry are a better fit", and that "Hermione's always there for Harry." However, in the same interview, she later clarified: "Maybe she and Ron will be alright with a bit of counselling, you know. I wonder what happens at wizard marriage counselling? They'll probably be fine. He needs to work on his self-esteem issues and she needs to work on being a little less critical." Watson later clarified that Rowling's comments about pairing Hermione up with Harry were taken out of context, and that she was in fact joking.

Bryan Konietzko served as co-series creator of Avatar: The Last Airbender and The Legend of Korra. He later stated that he was aware of the "Kataang vs. Zutara" discourse for the former show, adding that the show's crew was wavering on how direct they could be with Kataang. Others criticized the show's creator for going "a little overboard" in their criticism of Zutara shippers, stating that it led to be more shipping discourse. Zach Tyler Eisen, who voiced Aang in the series, later stated that he favored the "Kataang" ship, and joked, after Dante Basco (who voiced Zuko), mentioned Zutara, "this is a Zutara-free zone. It's all in your head, buddy." Basco and Mae Whitman (voice of Katara) were also noted as creating content for a week celebrating the Zutara ship. In addition, Albert Kim, showrunner of the live-action adaptation, said he was "smart enough" to not get involved in the shipping debate because he is aware "how passionate both sets of fans are." Konietzko stated, in regard to the crew of Legend of Korra, that they were "not easily swayed" by posts on Tumblr or Twitter even though they "changed and tweaked stuff" as the show was being developed. DiMartino would later say that the final scene in the series made it clear that "Korra and Asami have romantic feelings for each other". Later, Konietzko said he had "bragging rights as the first Korrasami shipper", noting that Makorra was only the "endgame" when Book 1 closed, and added that once the series entered Book 2 they "knew we were going to have them [Korra and Mako] break up".

In an interview in April 2015, DiMartino and Konietzko refuted charges that Korrasami was not built up through the series run. Konietzko would later draw artwork of Korra and Asami embracing as an exclusive print for The Legend of Korra / Avatar: The Last Airbender Tribute Exhibition at Gallery Nucleus, in March 2015, with proceeds donated to an LGBTQ suicide prevention hotline, and a rainbow version of the artwork posed in June 2015. The relationship between Korra and Asami would also be developed in the canonical graphic novel series, The Legend of Korra: Turf Wars, with DiMartino telling Entertainment Weekly about the ship's impact and that he had heard personal stories about how the relationship between Korra and Asami "inspired young adults to come out" to their friends or family and Koh saying they wanted Korra and Asami to be resilient heroes in the series.

In interviews, the ship between Finn and Poe Dameron, was embraced by John Boyega and Oscar Isaac, who play these characters in Star Wars films. Natasha Liu Bordizzo and Ivanna Sakhno, who respectively play Shin and Sabine in the series Ahsoka, offered their support for the ship between their characters, with fans dubbing the ship "Wolfwren" or "Shabine".

== See also ==
- My Little Pony: Friendship Is Magic fan fiction
- Trekkie
- Larries, fans of shipping between Harry Styles and Louis Tomlinson of One Direction
- Stucky, shipping between Marvel characters Steve Rogers and Bucky Barnes
- Tweek x Craig, South Park episode that satirizes shipping culture
- Hanahaki disease, a fictional disease commonly used in slashfic
