= Buffy the Vampire Slayer in popular culture =

Culture influenced by the TV show

A popular American television show from the late 1990s through early 2000s, Buffy the Vampire Slayer has had a tremendous influence on popular culture that has attracted serious scholarly attention. Even the language used on the show has affected modern colloquial expressions. A noteworthy example of this pioneering is the fact that the first use on television of the phrase "to google" as a verb appeared on the show on October 15, 2002, in the fourth episode of the show's final season.

== References in other works of fiction ==
Buffy and its spinoff, Angel, which employed pop culture references as a frequent humorous device, have themselves also become a frequent pop culture reference in video games, comics and television shows, and have been frequently parodied and spoofed. Sarah Michelle Gellar, the actress who played Buffy, has herself participated in several parody sketches, including a Saturday Night Live sketch in which the Slayer is relocated to the Seinfeld universe, and adding her voice to an episode of Robot Chicken that parodied a would-be eighth season of Buffy. There are also several adult parodies of Buffy, web comics, and music.

=== Television ===
==== Sketch shows ====
There have been a number of spoofs of Buffy on notable TV comedy sketch shows. In chronological order:

- MADtv (1997) – "Buffy the Umpire Slayer" sketch in which Nicole Sullivan starred as 'Buffy'. The clip features Buffy, Willow (Lisa Arch), Xander, and Giles attempting to control the threat from blood-sucking baseball umpires.
- Saturday Night Live – Sarah Michelle Gellar starred in a sketch first aired on 1998, in which the Slayer was relocated to the Seinfeld universe, starring as an Elaine Benes version of Buffy. The sketch portrayed Jerry Seinfeld (Will Ferrell), George Costanza (Darrell Hammond), and Cosmo Kramer (Jim Breuer) as vampires.
- MADtv (2001) – Michelle Trachtenberg appeared in a sketch that has been entitled "Bunny the Vampire Slayer" by MADtv, and features the MADtv recurring character, Bunny Swan, (more commonly known as "Ms. Swan)". The five-minute clip includes Trachtenberg as Dawn Summers coming face to face with Bunny Swan in a graveyard. Bunny tells Dawn that she is her aunt, and also the slayer. It also includes cast members Andrew Daly as Spike, Mo Collins as Willow and Stephnie Weir as Tara.
- V Graham Norton – When Anthony Head appeared on Norton's show, he spoofed "Buffy" in a "Poofy the Vampire Slayer" sketch. Graham Norton portrayed 'Poofy', whilst Head portrayed 'Rupert Giles'.
- Robot Chicken – Series co-created by Seth Green (who portrayed Oz on Buffy). Sarah Michelle Gellar lent her voice to the episode "Plastic Buffet", which included a parodied would-be eighth season of Buffy. The story featured Chucky (voiced by Mark Hamill) and the soulless Lettuce Head Kids terrorising America. In addition, several cast members from Buffy the Vampire Slayer have lent their voices to Robot Chicken sketches including series creator Joss Whedon.
- Mad – A sketch in the television adaption of Mad Magazine features Buffy Summers attempting to kill Edward Cullen and Bella Swan in a parody of The Twilight Saga: Breaking Dawn – Part 1, titled "Staking Dawn".

==== Series television ====
- In Eureka, the character of Douglas Fargo frequently referred to his obsession with Buffy, most notably naming his Smart House "Sarah" after Sarah Michelle Gellar, the series' main actress.
- The Friends episode titled The One Where Chandler Can't Cry, included a scene in which Phoebe's twin sister, Ursula Buffay starred in a porn film named Buffay the Vampire Layer (parodying Buffy the Vampire Slayer, and perhaps alluding to real life Buffy adult parodies), which consists of Buffay seducing and having sex with a Dracula-like vampire. Ursula Buffay uses her twin sister Phoebe's name for the credits.
- In the X-Men: Evolution episode "SpykeCam", Rogue and Kitty Pryde can be seen dancing in the woods, recreating the dance scene between Buffy and Faith in the episode "Bad Girls".
- In The Simpsons episode "Homer of Seville" has Marge Simpson mentioning a buffet restaurant named Buffet the Hunger Slayer. In the 2009 episode "Rednecks and Broomsticks", Lisa Simpson becomes interested in joining a Wicca group, and decides to check on "Wiccapedia." Sure enough the computer screen shows a replica of Wikipedia, with an array of links: "Familiars: wolf, cat, ferret – will they eat you when you die?, 4,400+ articles; Dating: share your stories, 0 articles; Buffy the Vampire Slayer: The greatest show in history, 2,500,000,000+ articles."
- In the Xena: Warrior Princess episode "The Play's the Thing", a theater critic remarks, "I hear "Buffus the Bacchae Slayer" is playing next door."
- In an episode of Charmed, Prue and Phoebe Halliwell are investigating a mausoleum when Prue exclaims that there might be zombies or vampires present, to which Phoebe jokingly comments, "where's Buffy when you need her?".
- On the Disney Channel series Hannah Montana, Miley's foil/rival/crush, Jake Ryan (played by Cody Linley), is the star of a fictional television series Zombie Slayer at Zombie High, with obvious Buffy parallels.
- In an episode of Smallville ("Thirst"), Lana Lang is changed into a vampire by a blond sorority girl by the name of "Buffy Sanders" (a reference to Buffy Summers). Recurring character Professor Milton Fine, played by James Marsters (who played Spike on Buffy), tells Clark Kent, "There are no such things as vampires."
- In the Arthur special "Arthur, It's Only Rock and Roll", Muffy makes a commercial for her to promote Francine's band and show it to the Backstreet Boys. When Arthur and Buster, pretending to be Vampires, are on, Muffy, dressed as a super hero, comes to the rescue, calling herself "Muffy the Vampire Slayer." In the episode "The Making of Arthur", Muffy enters a contest hosted by Matt Damon, and names her entry "Muffy the Umpire Slayer".
- A season-one episode of the show Big Wolf on Campus was called "Muffy the Werewolf Slayer."
- In the House of Mouse episode "Gone Goofy" (in "Donald's Goofy World" segment), when Donald Duck is watching TV, there is a show on called "Goofy the Vampire Slayer".
- In the WB/CW series Gilmore Girls, Rory teases Paris, who is afraid to go outside in the dark. Rory asks if "she's afraid to run into Drusilla and Spike". Another time, when Paris going out late to hook up with someone, Rory asks "With who? Spike and Drusilla?"
- In a Farscape episode, one of the things that the astronaut John Crichton regrets about being caught in a wormhole and sent to a distant place in the galaxy is that, even if he manages to return to Earth, by then Buffy the Vampire Slayer would have ended.
- On Will & Grace, Jack admits to being a fan of the show and Willow in particular and the fact that she is a lesbian. He also bursts out "Oh, for the love of Buffy and Angel – just say it!", referring to the well-known love story between the two characters.
- On Malcolm in the Middle, in the episode Francis Escapes, Francis asks his girlfriend over the phone if she is watching Buffy, due to the sounds coming from the television, as well as her lack of interest in the conversation.
- In series 2 of the British Sitcom Spaced, Tim prays that he will get his dream job at Darkstar Comics, kneeling in front of a Buffy poster. Another character is described as being "shallow, like Cordelia from Buffy the Vampire Slayer and latterly Angel, the spin-off series that was set in L.A."
- An episode of The Twilight Zone (Second Revival) features Jessica Simpson baby sitting a young girl with a large collection of dolls which are actually her past carers. The girl mentions that she watched Buffy with one of the babysitters, saying that she wanted Buffy and Spike to hook up.
- In the Daria episode "Speedtrapped", Quinn remarks, "We'll be through the criminal justice system and home in time for Buffy."
- On the HBO series True Blood, based on The Southern Vampire Mysteries by Charlaine Harris, Sam Merlotte quips, "You know what I really wish would come to Marthaville? Huh? Buffy. Or Blade."
- On The Cleveland Show, in the episode "Birth of a Salesman", Tim the Bear prays to Jesus Christ for Cleveland Brown and Terry to go to the bar so he could catch up to his sales, then he prays "Thank you Jesus. Now maybe we can think about bringing back Buffy the Vampire Slayer". Also, in the Season 2 final, Hot Cocoa Bang Bang, a Buffy fangirl kills both Robert Pattinson and Kristen Stewart at Comic-con by stabbing them with a wooden stake.
- In Strange Attractors, an episode of Heroes, Becky tells Claire that she (Claire) did not have to "go all Buffy."
- In the Australian soap opera Neighbours, Kate Ramsay compares Donna's love triangle to "Buffy, Angel and Riley".
- In a YouTube Red series called "Foursome" Season 2, Dakota makes a reference to piercing belly buttons being a thing done back in Buffy's "days".
- Dawson's Creek in an episode entitled, "Valentine's Day Massacre", Pacey Witter makes a reference to Buffy while confessing his secret feelings for Joey Potter to his brother Doug. He tells Doug that if he acts on his feelings "the earth would crack open and Capeside would become home to a huge Hellmouth that would spew forth endless monsters and demons..."
- In an episode of Bones (of which David Boreanaz, who played Angel, is a lead character) the overly chipper lab intern Daisy Wick remarks that she often thinks to herself "WWBD? What would Brennan do?" harkening to the common fan phrase 'What would Buffy do'. There is also another in the first episode of Season 6, where Caroline Julian, the state prosecutor, makes a reference. When referring to the fact that all of the Jeffersonian team have come back to D.C, she states that "The whole Scooby Gang's comin' back"
- An episode in the first season of Imaginary Mary, Dora and Andy fake a sick day from school to not run the race and bond together by binge watching Buffy and Andy fanboys about Sarah Michelle Gellar.
- In the series 2 opener of Being Human, Annie remarks to Nina that there was a werewolf named Nina in Buffy, though this character actually appeared on its spin-off Angel. Also in the episode "Pack It Up, Pack It In" of the American version, Aidan references at "time in the 90's when all the vampires knew karate," referencing the long fight sequences that preceded most of the vampire kills in Buffy.
- In episode 17 "Hell House" in Season 1 of Supernatural, Harry is freaking out and wants to abandon their ghost hunting endeavors when Ed tells Harry "Remember, WWBD. What would Buffy do?" Harry responds with "I know but, Ed, she's stronger than me." In Season 7 episode 7 entitled "The Mentalists" the show speaks of an Orb of Thesulah which was used to restore Angel's soul. Also, in Season 7 episode 5 "Shut Up Dr. Phil" that guest stars Charisma Carpenter (Cordelia) and James Marsters (Spike) there is an art auction in which images in two of the paintings bear a striking resemblance to Giles and Willow.
- The Disney show Kim Possible has Kim and Bonnie vying for captain of the cheerleading team. When Bonnie brags about all the effort she is putting in Kim warns that if she tries too hard she will spontaneously combust, referencing the season one episode The Witch where a witch takes control of her daughter's body to be a cheerleader, and sets one of her rivals on fire. Kim also wears very similar clothes to an outfit Buffy wore one time in The Dark Age (lime green top and blue cargo pants while doing aerobics, which is Kim's normal civilian look.)
- How I Met Your Mother features several Buffy references. Half the main cast and many of the guest stars are from shows by Joss Whedon and stars Alyson Hannigan who played Willow. She is very interested in a lesbian romance with friend Robin, referencing the character. Lily (Alyson Hannigan) also suggests "Tara" as a baby name for her and her husband Marshall's baby while she is trying to get pregnant.
- In episode 12 "Skin Deep" in Season 1 of Once Upon a Time, written by Jane Espenson, a regular writer and producer for Buffy The Vampire Slayer, the scythe featured in the final season was an item briefly shown in Rumpelstiltskin's castle.
- In episode 6 "Real Estate" in Season 3 of Haven character Claire Callahan appears at a Halloween party in a cheerleader's outfit with a stake in hand. When her appearance as a cheerleader is remarked upon by the show's main character Audrey Parker, Claire frowns correcting her by saying "I'm a Vampire Slayer." Later on in the episode the cast enters a mysterious house where they are trapped by the house itself, the front door vanishes and all the windows suddenly inexplicably close, much like in the season four Halloween episode "Fear Itself" in Buffy where the scoobies go to a house party on Halloween and get trapped inside the house when all of the exits vanish and are closed up.
- In 2007, Comedy Central produced a pilot for a comedy series entitled "Not Another High School Show." Alison Brie portrayed "Muffy the Vampire Slayer."
- In an episode of The Big Bang Theory, Leonard and Penny watch Buffy the Vampire Slayer in the hopes that it will be a common interest, but although Leonard enjoys it, Penny cares little for it. In the final episode of the show, Raj attends the Nobel Prize ceremony with Sarah Michelle Gellar and Sheldon asks "Is that Buffy the Vampire Slayer?".
- In The Crazy Ones episode "Bad Dad", Robin Williams asked Sarah Michelle Gellar where she 'learned that Dukes of Hazzard thing.' Gellar replied, "Sunnydale."
- Season 3 episode 17 of The Flash, "Duet" was inspired by season 6, episode 7 of Buffy the Vampire Slayer, "Once More, with Feeling."
- In the South Park episode "The New Terrance and Phillip Movie Trailer", Shelly Marsh wants to watch Buffy the Vampire Slayer on TV.
- In The Vampire Diaries: "Smells Like Teen Spirit" (2011) — Damon calls Elena "Buffy" during her vampire slaying training. "The Murder of One" (2012) — Rebekah, a vampire seeking revenge from the also vampire Damon, is referred as "Buffy the vampire".

=== Film ===
In the international release of the 2004 Russian film Night Watch, a major character is seen watching television which is airing a scene from the show where Buffy meets Dracula in the cemetery – dubbed into Russian. On the DVD version when the movie is dubbed into English the original audio for the episode is used.

In the 2004 family comedy Johnson Family Vacation one of the main characters is seen watching the episode "Chosen" where Buffy is seen fighting ubervamps during the climactic battle seen within the Hellmouth.

In the 2004 American comedy White Chicks, Marcus refers to the self-racist, black, football player Latrell as "Buffy the White Girl Slayer".

The 2005 Australian film Hating Alison Ashley also briefly refers to Buffy. When brainstorming plots for a school play, two girls talk about "a normal girl, who's beautiful..." and "one day as she is walking through the cemetery she realises she's...BUFFY!" Their idea is knocked back immediately.

In the 2007 film The Jane Austen Book Club, directed by Robin Swicord, also starring Marc Blucas who played Riley Finn on Buffy the Vampire Slayer, Jocelyn finds herself surrounded by Buffy fans as to she is around a "Buffy convention" called the "Buffy Contingency."

In the 2010 American vampire spoof Vampires Suck, based in most part on Twilight film series, Buffy is portrayed by Krystal Mayo. She uses an outfit similar to Buffy the Vampire Slayer Season Eight No. 1 cover.

In 2011 film remake Fright Night vampire hunter Peter Vincent (David Tennant) refers to Charley (Anton Yelchin) and his girlfriend Amy (Imogen Poots) as their "little Scooby Gang" because of their desire to kill a vampire.

At the end of My Name Is Bruce, Bruce Campbell tells Jeff and Kelly to call Buffy the next time they unleash a demon from Hell.

In 2012, adult entertainment company Adam & Eve Pictures released a pornographic parody film based on the show starring Lexi Belle as Buffy.

In 2014, the character Stosh "Piz" Piznarski in Veronica Mars refers to the main setting of Neptune, California as sitting on top of a Hellmouth.

In the 2020 film The New Mutants, there is a scene where the characters have the show playing on a TV in the background.

In 2025's The Naked Gun, Frank Drebin Jr. (Liam Neeson) lends Beth (Pamela Anderson) his DVR so she can binge the "Buffy" episodes he recorded. However, when he sees she hooked the device up to the internet, he discovers the episodes have been erased, and laments their loss by naming several secondary characters he will miss seeing, including Cordelia and Oz.

==== Fan films ====
Fan films parodying or paying tribute to Buffy have become more common, as computer and digital technology has advanced and become affordable, and distribution over the internet has become easier.

=== Books ===
In the French fantasy novel "Mattew Whiter et la dague de Midas" (2009) by Alexis Pichard, Mattew, a young sorcerer who just discovered he is a sorcerer, is appalled at the magical community's knowing who he is. Trying to comfort him, his talking cat then ironically asks him whether he wants to change names, saying: "do you think Buffy and Harry changed names? Well, they didn't! You are who you are."

=== Comics ===
DC Comics' Young Justice title made numerous references to a television series called Wendy the Werewolf Stalker, including a two-part story, during #33–34 where several of the book's heroines actually go to Hollywood to take part in an episode. WtWS is a straightforward "homage" to BtVS, with the twist that show creator "Joe Westin" is revealed to himself be a vampire.

Archie Comics character, Betty Cooper, dresses up as Bunny the Vampire Slayer for a Halloween costume party.

In the webcomic YU+ME:dream by Megan Gedris, the Cheese Man, from the Season Four BTVS episode "Restless", makes a cameo.

Buffy is parodied in an issue of Bart Simpsons Comics titled "Lisa the Vampire Croaker", in which Lisa Simpson is trained by janitor Willy to fight vampires.

In the webcomic Little Alice, the creator frequently mentions Buffy as one of his most prominent influences. Buffy is credited as the creative outlet for the story, characters, and many of the panels.

Buffy is referenced throughout issue #11 of the Marvel Comics series The Unbelievable Gwenpool, in which the titular Gwen Poole is hired by the Mayor of Doodkill to defend his village from a vampire (who turns out to be the dhampir Blade, who nicknames Gwen "Pink Slayer"), mentioning the television he has watched (Buffy the Vampire Slayer) to indicate the best vampire slayers to be teenage girls, to which Gwen thanks him in agreement, stating that they have "seen the same television".

=== Video games ===
Anarchy Online (June 27, 2001) features a decorative statue called the "Marble Statue of the Goddess Buffy Summers".

In the video games The X-Files: Resist or Serve (March 14, 2004) and Max Payne (July 25, 2001), a secret room contains a staked corpse with "Buffy" smeared on the wall in blood.

The English version of Secret of Mana, a video game for the SNES which appeared shortly after the original movie came out, contains a boss named Buffy the Vampire.

In The Burning Crusade, the first expansion to the World of Warcraft video game, after defeating one of the raid bosses named The Lurker Below the player can obtain The Seal of Danzalar – an epic quality ring with the "From beneath you it devours" sentence engraved on it.

Also in World of Warcraft during the "Brewfest" world event, a human NPC with the name "Anne Summers" can be found as a Cheese Vendor in the event area outside of Ironforge. "Anne" being Buffy's middle name and the name she went by during her summer in Los Angeles and the NPC's status as a cheese vendor referencing when Willow tells Riley "She likes cheese... I'm not saying it's the key to her heart, but Buffy... she likes cheese."

In the video game Fable II, one of the optional quests the Hero can undertake consists of helping a farmer in Brightwood Farm called Giles take revenge upon a bandit called Ripper, or helping Ripper expand his operations by killing Giles. This may be a reference to Rupert 'Ripper' Giles (Farmer Giles' son is called Rupert).

A replica of Spike's crypt can be found in Grand Theft Auto: San Andreas.

In Transformice, there is a non-player character called Buffy, who was a vampire slayer. There is also a Halloween achievement title called "Vampire Slayer".

=== Other ===
In 2005, a Trans-Neptunian object 2004 XR_{190} was unofficially named "Buffy", after the main character of the series.

Buffy Summers is number 13 on Bravo's "100 Greatest TV Characters". The show hits #3 on TV Guide's list of the "25 Top Cult Shows Ever!" (May 30, 2004, Issue)

Entertainment Weekly named the show No. 10 on its list of best TV shows in the past 25 years. It also named the season 2 episode "Halloween" #11 on its list of top 25 Holiday Themed Episodes. It also named Joyce Summers's exit on "Buffy" No. 20 on its list of top 25 Farewells. In 2012, the show was listed as No. 1 in the "25 Best Cult TV Shows from the Past 25 Years," with a remark on "the show's fierce following."

In Dave Barry's 1999 novel "Big Trouble", main character Elliot Arnold is watching Buffy and eating Cheeze-its. When he receives urgent news and leaves the house, the narrative focuses on Buffy struggling against a vampire..."things didn't look very good for Buffy."

In the 2004 novel, Dead to the World by Charlaine Harris, Sookie Stackhouse has season one of Buffy the Vampire Slayer on tape, which was originally given to her as a gag gift from her friend Tara Thornton. She lets Eric Northman, a vampire, watch the show.

Sam, the heroine of Meg Cabot's novel All American Girl, claimed Buffy as her inspiration, and makes frequent remarks about the franchise.

In January 2010, Sideshow Collectibles released Throne of the Slayer.

The Big Finish Productions Doctor Who audio drama Minuet in Hell parodies Buffy in the form of a vapid American teenage girl named Becky Lee Kowalcyzk (Helen Goldwyn) who fights demons.

In November 2011 was announced that Facebook tapped Taiwanese cellphone maker HTC to build a smartphone that has the social network integrated at the core of its being. The phone is code-named "Buffy", after the television vampire slayer.

English singer-songwriter Ed Sheeran is a declared fan of the series and reportedly has drawn inspiration from the show for his compositions, and has sampled some of its background music.

In October 2020, Megan Thee Stallion released the song "Don't Stop", which references Buffy in the lyrics.

British YouTuber Phil Lester is a notable fan of the series. He stated that his favorite episodes are "Once More, with Feeling" and "Hush" during a fan Q&A. He also mentioned Buffy Summers as his favorite fictional character.

In Jennifer Estep's first book in the Mythos Academy teen series, Touch of Frost, the main character says "I wondered if I was stuck in an insane asylum somewhere, just dreaming all this. Like Buffy." alluding to the episode in the sixth season where Buffy has flashes of being in an insane asylum and is not able to tell which world is real.

In 2022, Buffy has been in the lyrics of the song Flawless by the rapper named Yeat.

In honor of Syfy's 25th anniversary in 2017, Syfy did "25 greatest" lists, celebrating the last 25 years of all science fiction, fantasy, and horror:

- Joss Whedon made it into the list of "25 of the Greatest Screenwriters in Genre Storytelling".
- The show made it into the list of "The 25 best fantasy series of the past 25 years".
- Buffy Summers made it into the list of "The 25 best female characters of the past 25 years".
- Spike made it into the list of "25 villains we love to hate from the last 25 years"
- Willow Rosenberg made it into the list of "The 25 best sidekicks from the last 25 years".
- Buffy vs. Faith made it into the list of "The 25 best action sequences maybe ever, but definitely of the past 25 years"
- Buffy's speeches in Season 7's Chosen and Bring On the Night made it into the list of "The 25 greatest speeches from the past 25 years".
- Hush and The Body made it into the list of "The 25 greatest standalone TV episodes of the past 25 years".
- Once More With Feeling and Dark Willow made it into the list of "The 25 most magical moments in film and TV from the last 25 years".

In 2025, the online Batteboarding series Death Battle pitted Buffy against Blade from Marvel Comics. The matchup was the 3rd time that Death Battle had done a fight in live-action, with film production company Ismahawk producing the fight and Mair Mulroney playing Buffy.

The 2018 Kate Nash song "Take Away" contains the lyric "I wanna watch Buffy in my room on the TV." Nash had previously played Buffy in a recreation of episode "Once More, with Feeling" alongside Emmy the Great.

== See also ==
- Buffy studies
- List of female action heroes
- Xena: Warrior Princess in popular culture
