= Xena =

Fictional character from the TV series "Xena: Warrior Princess"

- Lucy Lawless as Xena, holding her chakram
- First appearance: "The Warrior Princess" (1995)
- Last appearance: "A Friend in Need, Part 2" (2001)
- Created by: Robert Tapert; John Schulian
- Portrayed by: Lucy Lawless

In-universe information
- Species: Human
- Occupation: Warrior for good, formerly Warlord and Destroyer of Nations
- Affiliation: Ares, Hercules, Borias, Caesar, Alti, Lao Ma, Ephiny, Joxer, Eve, the Amazons
- Weapon: Sword, chakram, whip, breast dagger
- Family: Cyrene (mother); Nelo (father; deceased); Lyceus (brother; deceased); Toris (brother)
- Significant others: Gabrielle, Marcus, Ares, Caesar
- Children: Solan (son, with Borias; deceased); Eve (daughter; reincarnation of Callisto)
- Relatives: Unnamed maternal grandmother; Mel Pappas (descendant); Melinda Pappas (descendant); Melinda Pappas II (descendant); Jonah (grandson)
- Nationality: Thracian

Xena is a fictional character from the Xena: Warrior Princess franchise, portrayed by New Zealander actress Lucy Lawless and co-created by Robert Tapert and John Schulian. She first appeared as a villain in the 1995–1999 television series Hercules: The Legendary Journeys before joining forces with Hercules. Xena was popular with fans, so the producers decided to create a spin-off with the character in the starring role. She later appeared in the subsequent comic book of the same name, as well as the spin-off animated film The Battle for Mount Olympus, and non-canonical expanded universe material, such as books and video games.

Xena is the protagonist of the story, and the series depicts her on a quest to redeem herself from her dark past by using her formidable fighting skills to help people. She is joined by the bard Gabrielle, and together they go up against ruthless warlords and gods in the ancient mythological world. Xena was raised as the daughter of Cyrene and Atrius in Amphipolis; though the episode "The Furies" raises the possibility that Ares might be Xena's biological father, it is never pursued further. She has two brothers, the younger of whom is dead.

== Creation and production ==
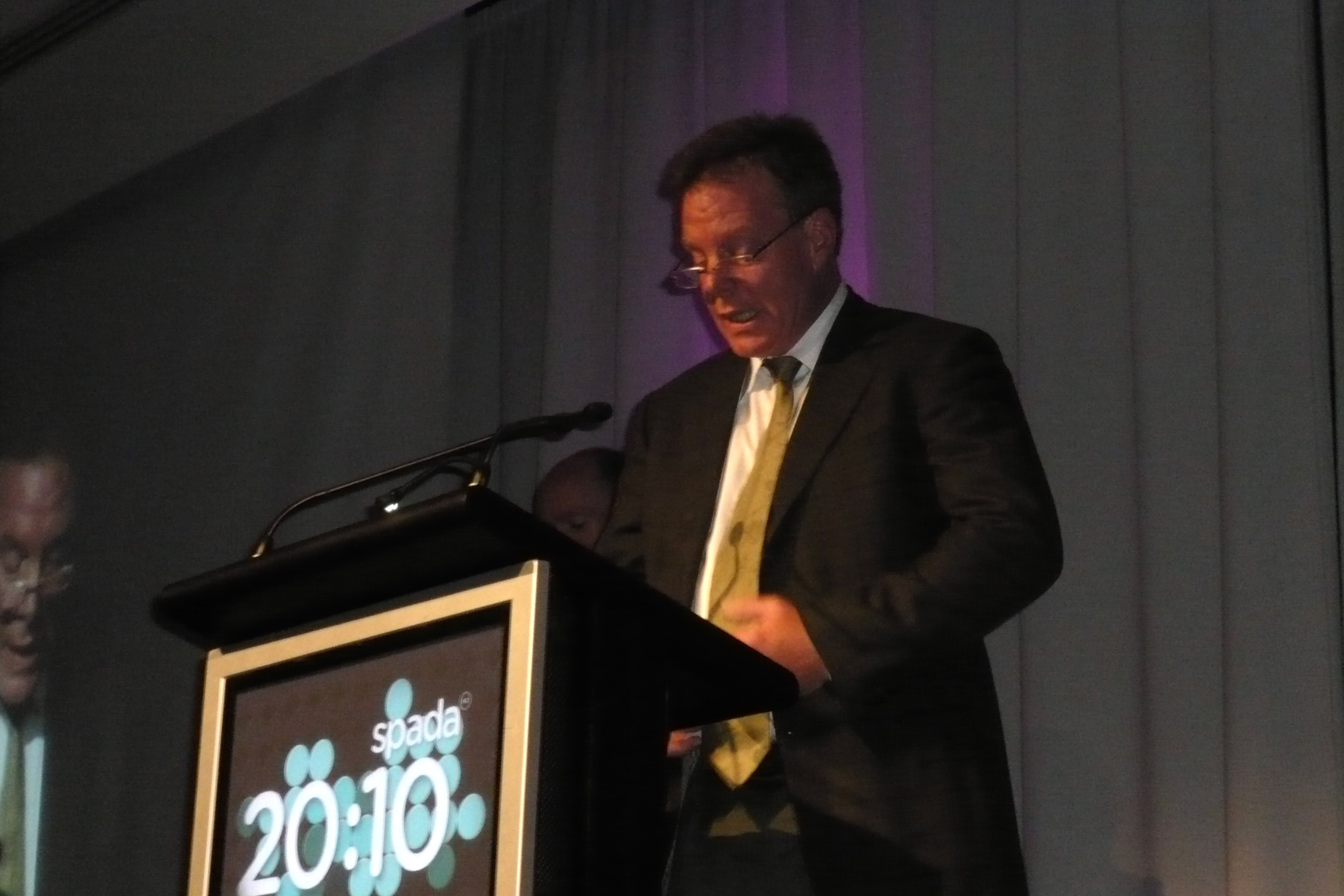
Xena co-creator Robert Tapert

Xena was developed in 1995 by John Schulian as a minor character in Hercules: The Legendary Journeys, although Lawless had already appeared as the character Lyla in the episode "As Darkness Falls". Xena was originally conceived to die at the end of the third episode, "Unchained Heart", but when the studio decided they wanted to do a spin-off from Hercules, producer Robert Tapert said that Xena was the best choice, since she was largely well received by television critics and fans and had a full story to be explored. The studio wanted a spinoff about Jason and the Argonauts, but Tapert said that show would be too similar to Hercules.

Tapert said he based Xena on the "evil warrior princesses" portrayed by Brigitte Lin in her Hong Kong films like Swordsman II (1992), Swordsmen III (1993) and The Bride with White Hair (1993). The original choice to play Xena was British actress Vanessa Angel, but she became ill and had to decline the role. Ultimately the role was given to Lawless as she was already a resident of New Zealand. Lawless had several mishaps playing the character due to the stunts (some of which she performed herself), such as getting cut by swords, being struck in the head, and horse-related incidents. In 1996, while rehearsing a sketch for The Tonight Show with Jay Leno, she broke her hip when she was thrown from a horse. As a result, several episodes of season two were edited to accommodate her recovery, some were changed so Lawless could appear only briefly, and new episodes were written to highlight Gabrielle and supporting characters.

Bruce Campbell, Rose McIver, Hudson Leick, and Ted Raimi also portrayed Xena in various episodes as a result of "body-swap" plotlines.

The name Xena derives from the ancient Greek ξένος (xenos), meaning "stranger".

== Appearances and development ==
=== Origins on Hercules ===
Xena originally appears as a villain in the Hercules episode "The Warrior Princess". Ten years into her career of pillaging and marauding, Xena meets Hercules. Initially, she sets out to kill him. In "The Gauntlet", her army turns against her, believing that she has become weak after she stops her lieutenant, Darphus, from killing a child in a sacked village. Xena runs a gauntlet and survives, becoming the only person ever to survive the gauntlet. She then fights Hercules in the hope that she will regain her army if she can bring back his head. Xena seems to be getting the upper hand until Hercules‘s cousin Illoran intervenes, inadvertently giving Hercules his sword, which allows him to fight Xena on equal ground and defeat her. However, Hercules refuses to kill Xena, telling her, "Killing isn't the only way of proving you're a warrior". Inspired by Hercules' integrity, and by the fact that he too lost family and yet chooses to fight in their honor, she decides to join him and defeat her old army.

In "Unchained Heart", the two share a brief romantic relationship before Xena decides to leave and start making amends for her past.

=== Fictional character history ===
==== Initial turn to evil ====
Several years prior to the series pilot, "Sins of the Past", Xena commits numerous deeds from terrorism to piracy and murder; at one point, she becomes known as the "Destroyer of Nations". Her journey down the path of evil arguably begins when her brother is killed during an attack by the warlord Cortese. Xena vows revenge and becomes estranged from her mother as a result.

Later she acts as the captain of a pirate ship, raiding ships and ransoming hostages. It is during one ransom attempt that she encounters a young Roman nobleman named Julius Caesar. Caesar is an experienced warrior and military commander with grand ambitions. He and Xena have a passionate love affair and plan to join forces. Caesar, however, betrays Xena. Caesar has Xena beaten and crucified (with her legs broken) on a beach to die of exposure, but she is saved by an Egyptian slave girl named M'Lila. M'Lila had originally stowed away on Xena's ship and subsequently befriends her and teaches Xena how to use pressure points. After saving Xena, M'Lila takes her to a healer who treats her injuries. While the healer is treating Xena, Roman soldiers burst in and try to kill Xena, but M'Lila shields Xena, takes a fatal shot from a crossbow and dies in Xena's arms.

This event drives Xena to the side of evil completely. Despite her injuries, she kills the soldiers but warns the last one before he dies, "Tell Hades to prepare himself; a new Xena is born tonight."

==== First steps towards redemption ====
Afterward, Xena becomes the leader of an army and aligns herself with Borias, seducing him away from his family and the two join forces. The two become lovers and Xena eventually becomes pregnant with her son Solan. During her pregnancy, Xena travels with her army to China, where she hopes to build an alliance with the powerful Lao family.

Borias betrays Xena, leading to Xena running for her life and being hunted. While on the run, Xena meets Lao Ma, a woman with special abilities. She scares away the hounds chasing Xena with just a look and can move like a martial artist which awes Xena. Lao Ma cares for Xena, and under her friend's guidance, she learns to put aside much of her hatred and pain. Lao Ma heals Xena's crippled legs and it is implied that she teaches Xena fighting moves she had not yet developed. Lao Ma gives Xena the metaphorical title "Warrior Princess", intending that she be a major catalyst for change in the land.

Borias and Xena reconcile and renew their alliance, only to break it a final time and split their forces between them, with Xena proving the stronger of the two. Borias is killed in the ensuing battle, and Xena gives the newborn Solan to the centaurs to raise.

==== Encounter with Hercules and subsequent reform ====
Xena continues her life as a warlord for many years. She turns against her troops to protect a baby whose family would not pay the ransom she demanded. Her troops try to kill Xena for becoming weak in their eyes. After these events, Xena travels with Hercules for a short time and they share a brief romantic relationship. While their romance does not last long, the two form a special friendship. In "Prometheus", each acknowledges the positive impact the other had on the world.

==== Meeting Gabrielle ====
Haunted by her past transgressions, she is about to give up on her life as a warrior completely. In the episode "Sins of the Past", she strips off her armor and weapons and buries them in the dirt. She sees a group of village girls being attacked by a band of warriors. In the group is Gabrielle. Xena saves the young women and warns an awestruck Gabrielle not to follow her.

Gabrielle follows Xena in a quest to persuade Xena to let her be her traveling companion. Xena returns to her hometown, Amphipolis, and eventually reconciles with her mother, Cyrene. She also visits the grave of her brother Lyceus. When Xena privately confides with Lyceus that it is difficult to be alone, Gabrielle—who is silently standing in the doorway of the crypt—tells her, "You're not alone." Soon, Xena agrees to allow Gabrielle to travel with her. Over time, Gabrielle becomes Xena's dearest friend.

==== Subsequent travels and hardships ====
Gabrielle and Xena become best friends and constant companions over the many adventures that follow. Each of the women learns from the other; Gabrielle becomes a warrior on behalf of good, while Xena develops a softer and more loving personality to balance her warrior's heart. Xena's life is marred by many tragedies. Her son Solan, who never came to know her as his mother, is killed by Hope, Gabrielle's demonic child, (with the help of Callisto); and Gabrielle nearly dies many times.

The instances where Xena and Gabrielle almost part ways tend to result from the outside manipulations of others. After Gabrielle's demonic daughter Hope kills Xena's son, Gabrielle, consumed with grief, journeys to stay with the Amazons. Xena locates her and tries to kill Gabrielle by throwing her over a cliff while she is in a weakened state. Xena fails and both women reconcile with the help of Solan's spirit. Solan creates the land of Illusia wherein, through music, both women express their grief and anger at each other and the traumas they have endured. Xena confesses that she did indeed kill Ming T'ien because he killed his mother Lao Ma. Xena admits to Solan that she is his mother and asks his forgiveness.

==== Enemies ====
Xena with Gabrielle in a second season episode

Soon after the start of her journeys with Gabrielle, Xena runs into Ares, who has known her since her warlord days and he tries to seduce her into joining him as his Warrior Queen, which she repeatedly thwarts. She also encounters a formidable warrior woman named Callisto, whose family was killed by Xena's army years ago and has since vowed her revenge.

==== The path to redemption continues ====
Marcus, a warrior, close friend and lover from her warlord days, whom she persuades to follow her in choosing good, is killed while doing his first good deed. Later he is allowed to briefly return to the world of the living to help thwart a vicious killer who has escaped from the Underworld. He and Xena spend a night together before Marcus has to return to the other side. Several years after her first meeting with Lao Ma, a messenger is sent by Lao Ma to ask Xena to travel to China to aid in stopping a great evil. She sets out without delay, but insists that she must deal with this alone and that Gabrielle stay behind.

Xena arrives too late to save her mentor and friend Lao Ma from being tortured to death by her own son, the emperor Ming T'ien and is crushed with the loss. Finally, she and Gabrielle are crucified by the Romans on the Ides of March by her former lover Caesar. Caesar himself is betrayed and killed by Brutus. They are later revived by a mystic named Eli, along with the spiritual aid of Callisto, who became a demon and then an angel after Xena killed her.

==== Eve/Livia ====
This leads to the birth of Xena's daughter, Eve. After Xena lets Callisto die, she is sent to Tartarus but later returns and becomes a god and an even greater enemy of Xena. Finally Xena attempts to save Callisto from her suffering by sacrificing herself. Callisto becomes an angel and Xena a demon. Before Eve is born, Callisto the angel implants her soul in Xena's unborn baby as a way to redeem herself from her past. Mother and daughter have little time together, as Eve is prophesied to bring about the Twilight of the Olympian gods and the rise of the One God. To stop the gods from pursuing the infant Eve, Xena and Gabrielle fake their deaths, but their plan goes awry when Ares buries them in an ice cave, where they sleep for 25 years.

During that time, Eve is adopted by the Roman nobleman Octavius. She grows up to become Livia, the Champion of Rome and a ruthless persecutor of Eli's followers. In a sense she has become a reincarnation of Callisto. Eve's ruthless behavior may be due to the influence of Callisto's soul, but this is unclear, particularly since Callisto was purged of all the evil within her when she became an angel. After her return, Xena is able to turn Livia to repentance, and Livia takes back the name Eve and becomes the Messenger of Eli. After Eve's cleansing by baptism, Xena is granted the power to kill gods as long as her daughter lives. In a final confrontation, the Twilight comes to pass when Xena kills most of the gods to save her daughter, with the help of God and Archangel Michael, and is herself saved by Ares when he gives up his immortality to heal the badly injured and dying Eve and Gabrielle. Xena later helps Ares regain his godhood, though he does become an adversary for Xena again and in modern day as well.

==== Final redemption and death ====
Xena's quest for redemption ends when she sacrifices herself to kill the Japanese demon Yodoshi, who is holding the souls of the dead. Xena single-handedly fights the Japanese army and dies. Xena, now a spirit, fights and kills Yodoshi. Xena decides to stay dead so the souls of the 40,000 she accidentally killed years ago can be released into a state of peace. The series ends with Gabrielle on a ship, holding Xena's ashes and speaking with Xena's spirit.

==== Legacy ====
According to Naiyima, a darshan or an "enlightened one", this is only one of many lives Xena will live throughout the ages. One such life is that of Arminestra, an Indian holy mother who leads a movement that preaches peace. Another is a transcriber of ancient languages named Melinda Pappas who uncovers the tomb of Ares during WWII and is possessed by the spirit of Xena to stop the God of War. In many of those lives, she will walk a path together with her friend, Gabrielle, furthering the cause of good against evil.

=== Skills and abilities ===
Xena has many skills that she acquired during her extensive travels across the ancient world throughout the years. She has remarkable skill and prowess in hand-to-hand combat, displaying numerous acrobatic tricks and the ability to disable or otherwise kill multiple opponents at once. She is also skilled in the use of pressure points – being able to cripple or even kill someone if she triggers the appropriate pressure point. Xena has extensive knowledge of first aid and herbal remedies that rivals any professional healer.

Xena's signature weapon is the chakram, a razor-edged throwing weapon which she often uses for ranged combat. Xena can skillfully deflect the chakram off the surfaces it strikes, allowing her to hit multiple targets in one throw. She can deflect the chakram back towards her, allowing her to catch it. Besides being a formidable weapon, the chakram has other uses such as distracting enemies or quickly cutting distant ropes. After breaking in half, Xena reforged her chakram with diameter "handles", called the "Yin-Yang" chakram. These were utilized as daggers, could split in two mid-flight to strike multiple different targets, and allowed for "boomerang" flight capabilities. Along with her sword and chakram, she has also shown great proficiency with other weapons such as staves, daggers, and whips.

Xena often utilized a signature war cry. When asked about this unique cry, actress Lawless replied that it was her attempt at performing an Arabic ululation vocal trill. “I tried to do it and I couldn’t, so I just twisted it to do my own version of it and out came the Xena thing,” she explained.

Xena is a tactician, leader, and strategic thinker. She has the ability to analyze her enemy's tactics and effectively formulate a response. In responding to her enemies' attacks, she demonstrates her creativity and ingenuity; at times, she has worked with little or no resources and limited time. Xena is well versed in military tactics such as forming a defensive perimeter, building defensive fortifications, organizing and leading troops, and cutting an enemy's supply lines. She also repeatedly demonstrates a talent for disguises, infiltration, and cryptography.

Although the majority of her skills are martial and mental, Xena does have some supernatural abilities. On three occasions, she used telekinesis and energy projection thanks to Lao Ma's teachings. Xena also once possessed the power to kill gods through her daughter, Eve. Outside of these specific powers, Xena knows the rudiments of most other forms of magic, enough that she can effectively battle or outwit magic-wielding opponents.

== In other media ==
Xena has appeared in all of the series spin-offs, usually as the lead character. The animated movie Hercules and Xena: The Battle for Mount Olympus marks the first appearance of Xena outside of the television series. She also appears in the comics series Xena: Warrior Princess originally released by Topps and Dark Horse Comics. In 2007, Dynamite Entertainment acquired the rights. This resulted in Dynamite Entertainment's spin-off comic book series Xena: Contest of the Pantheons and Dark Xena. This last takes place after the television series ended.

Xena is a playable character in the videogames Xena: Warrior Princess, and a selectable character in The Talisman of Fate. In 1999, Lucy Lawless also appeared in the animated television show The Simpsons as Xena during the Treehouse of Horror X. In the video game League of Legends, the character Sivir has a skin titled "Warrior Princess" that resembles Xena.

A statue of Xena made an appearance in Doctor Strange in the Multiverse of Madness, confirmed by the film's director Sam Raimi. However, the statue did not indicate any bigger relation to the Marvel Cinematic Universe and only served as a fun easter egg with no narrative subtext.

== Reception and legacy ==
=== Lesbian subtext and debates ===
Xena has enjoyed a particular cult status in the lesbian community. Some of the lesbian fanbase see Xena and Gabrielle as a couple and have embraced them as role models and lesbian icons. A group called The Marching Xenas participated in many gay and lesbian pride parades.

A subject of much interest and debate among viewers is the question of whether Xena and Gabrielle are lovers. The issue is left deliberately ambiguous by the writers during most of the show. Jokes, innuendo, and other subtle evidence of a romantic relationship between Xena and Gabrielle are referred to as "lesbian subtext" or simply "subtext" by fans. The issue of the true nature of the Xena/Gabrielle relationship caused intense shipping debates in the fandom, which turned especially impassioned due to spillover from real-life debates about same-sex sexuality and gay rights.

In a 2003 interview with Lesbian News magazine, Lawless stated that after the series finale, she had come to believe that Xena and Gabrielle's relationship was "Gay. Definitely... There was always a 'Well, she might be or she might not be,' but when there was that drip of water passing between their lips in the very final scene, that cemented it for me. Now it wasn't just that Xena was bisexual and kinda liked her gal pal and they kind of fooled around sometimes, it was 'Nope, they're married, man'."

The Xena fandom also popularized the term Altfic (from "alternative fiction") to refer to same-sex romantic fan fiction.

Inspired by episodes that featured Xena and Gabrielle sharing past lives or living in alternate timelines, Xena fanfiction writers created an original new genre known as Uberfic.

She was ranked No. 3 in AfterEllen.com's Top 50 Favorite Female TV Characters.

=== Popular culture ===
Xena: Warrior Princess has been referred to as a pop cultural phenomenon, sex symbol, and feminist and lesbian/bisexual icon. The television series, which employed pop culture references as a humorous device, has itself become a pop culture reference in video games, comics and television shows, and has been frequently parodied and spoofed.

Xena has been credited by many, including Buffy the Vampire Slayer creator Joss Whedon, with blazing the trail for a new generation of female action heroes such as Buffy, Max of Dark Angel, Sydney Bristow of Alias, and Beatrix Kiddo a.k.a. the Bride in Quentin Tarantino's Kill Bill. The director Quentin Tarantino is also a fan of Xena. After serving as Lucy Lawless' stunt double on Xena, stunt woman Zoë E. Bell was recruited to be Uma Thurman's stunt double in Tarantino's Kill Bill. By helping to pave the way for female action heroes in television and film, Xena also strengthened the stunt woman profession. David Eick, one of the co-developers of Xena, was the executive producer of Battlestar Galactica, which also features strong female characters and Lucy Lawless in a recurring role.

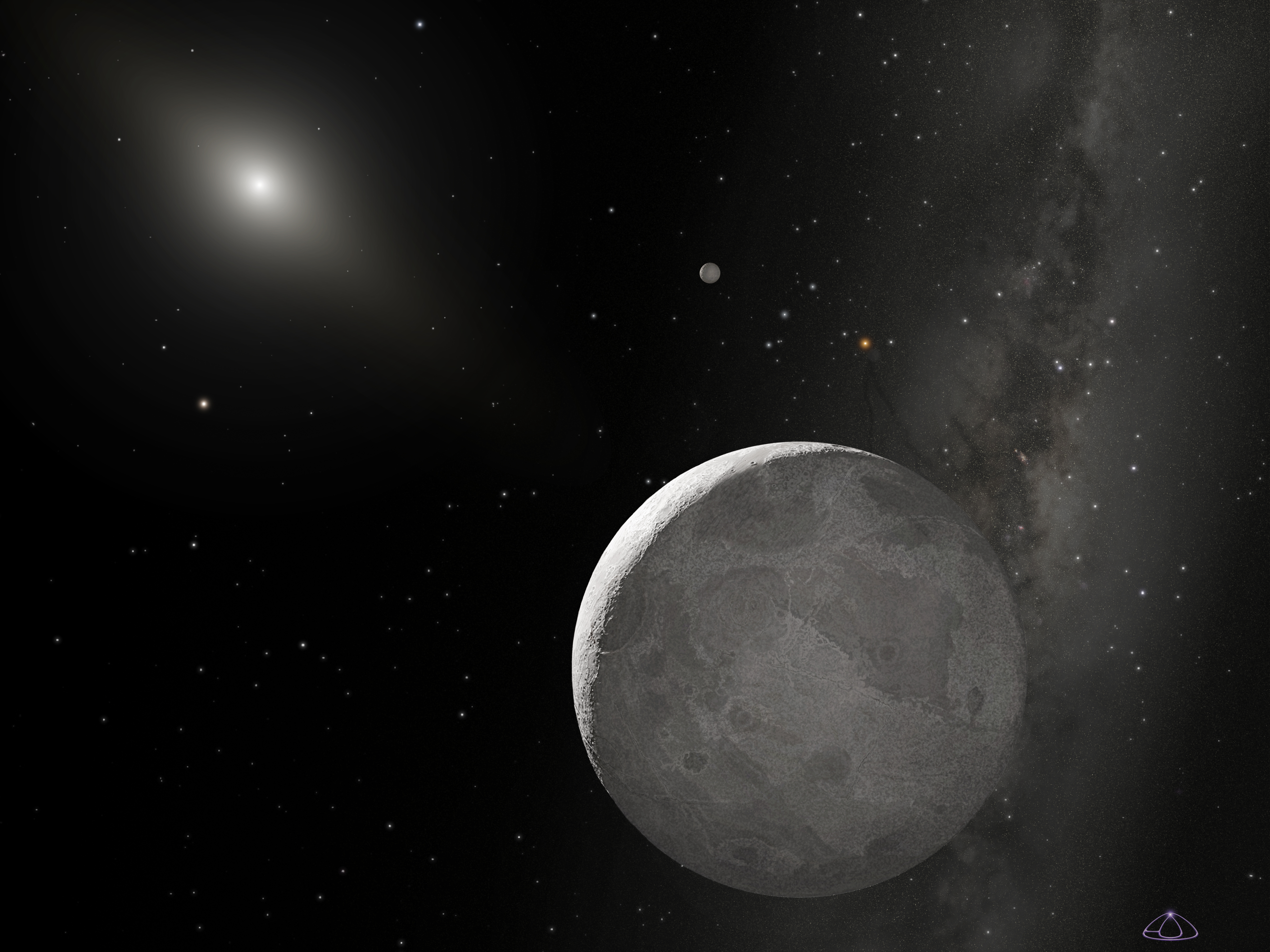
Artist's impression of Eris and Dysnomia. Eris is the main object, Dysnomia the small grey disk just above it. The flaring object top left is the Sun.

In 2005, the team that discovered the dwarf planet 2003 UB_{313} nicknamed it "Xena" in honor of the TV character. On 1 October 2005, the team announced that 2003 UB_{313} had a moon, which they had nicknamed "Gabrielle". The objects were officially named Eris and Dysnomia by the International Astronomical Union on 13 September 2006. Although the official names have legitimate roots in Greek mythology, "Dysnomia" is also a synonym to the word "anomia", which means "lawlessness" in Greek, perpetuating the link with Lucy Lawless.

In 2006, Lucy Lawless donated her personal Xena costume to the Museum of American History. In an interview the same year with Smithsonian, she was asked the question "Was the Warrior Princess outfit comfortable?" and she responded:

Not at first, because they would put boning in the corset. It would cover up those little floating ribs that are so important for breathing, so I'd feel like I was having panic attacks. But it just became a second skin after a while. It was very functional, once I got over the modesty factor. I admit to being a little bit embarrassed the first couple weeks because I'd never worn anything so short.

— Lucy Lawless, Smithsonian, November 2006, page 44

In 2004, Xena was listed at number 100 in Bravo's 100 Greatest TV Characters.

== See also ==
- List of female action heroes and villains
