= Buffy Revamped =

Buffy The Vampire Slayer musical parody

Buffy Revamped is a one-person comedic stage show created and performed by British-Irish comedy writer Brendan Murphy. It is a parody and tribute to the cult TV series Buffy the Vampire Slayer, condensing all seven seasons into a single, 70-minute performance.

== Concept ==
The show follows Spike as he recounts the events that took place in Buffy the Vampire Slayer from his own point of view, using a blend of comedy, physical performance, and impersonations.

== Reception ==
The show has been met with positive reviews for its humor, creativity, and physicality. The Age called it "a hilarious trip down a '90s pop culture vortex," and TimeOut also recommended its "90s nostalgia". The Times described it as "a neat, densely referential, fondly disrespectful tribute" to Buffy the Vampire Slayer, while Playbill compared it to "our own little BuffyCon." Starburst Magazine described the show as "geek love at its best, and comedy theatre at its finest." Broadway World said "Brendan Murphy slays fan-laden crowds with Spike's recap of Buffy the Vampire Slayer".

== Accolades ==
- British Comedy Guide's Best Reviewed Comedy Show of Edinburgh Fringe 2023.
- Winner of Best One Person Show and Best Comedy Performance at the 2022 DarkChat Awards.
- Nominated for the 2023 Offie for Off Fest Award.

== Tours ==
Buffy Revamped has toured across the UK, Canada, Australia, and Europe - performing at venues such as Melbourne International Comedy Festival, Edinburgh International Conference Centre, the Gaiety Theatre in Dublin, Wales Millenium Centre in Cardiff, and the Lyric Theatre in London's West End.
