= Femslash =

Subgenre of slash fan fiction

The symbolic slash, used to separate the two names in a romantic pairing, from which slash fiction takes its name

Femslash (also known as "f/f slash", "f/f", "femmeslash", "altfic" and "sapphic") is a genre of fan fiction which focuses on romantic and/or sexual relationships between female fictional characters.

== Characteristics ==
Typically, characters featured in femslash are heterosexual in the canon universe; however, similar fan fiction about lesbian or bisexual female characters is commonly labeled as femslash for convenience. The term is generally applied only to fanworks based on Western fandoms; the nearest anime/manga equivalents are more often called yuri and shōjo-ai fanfiction. "Saffic" is a portmanteau of Sapphic from the term Sapphic love and fiction. "Altfic" as a term for fanfiction about loving relationships between women was popularized by Xena fans.

There is less femslash than there is slash based on male couples; for example, in The Lord of the Rings fandom, only a small number of femslash stories are written about the Arwen/Éowyn pairing in comparison to slash between the male characters. It has been suggested that heterosexual female slash authors generally do not write femslash, and that it is rare to find a fandom with two sufficiently engaging female characters. Janeway/Seven is the main Star Trek femslash pairing, as only they have "an on-screen relationship fraught with deep emotional connection and conflict". Although it is debated whether fanfiction about canon lesbians such as Willow and Tara of Buffy the Vampire Slayer counts as "slash", their relationship storylines are more coy than heterosexual ones, which entices Willow/Tara femslash authors to fill in the gaps in the known relationship storyline. It is "relatively recently" that male writers have begun writing femslash, and this entry of males into femslash has occurred within Buffy femslash. The femslash authorship is mostly female. As of 2008, femslash was enjoying increasing popularity and was the "dominant form" of slash in some fandoms.

== History ==
Femslash was relatively rare in fanfiction communities until the 1990s. The show Xena: Warrior Princess served as one of the first major femslash fandoms, with the relationship Xena/Gabrielle, and also served as one of the first major fandoms where alternative universe fics were widely written.

The television show The L Word set up a contest at the website FanLib.com where fans could submit a femme slash fanfic. The winner's story was incorporated into a scene of a third-season episode.

For more recent TV series, femslash fans have focused on shows with significant platonic female relationships such as Once Upon a Time, or with canonical queer women in Orange Is the New Black and The 100.

== See also ==
- Fan fiction
- Lesbian literature
- Lesbian science fiction
- Lesbianism in erotica
- My Little Pony: Friendship Is Magic fan fiction
- Slash fiction
- Xena: Warrior Princess in popular culture
- Yaoi
- Yuri (genre)
