= Uberfic =

Genre of fanfiction

Uberfic (short for uber fanfic, uberXena) or simply uber, über, or ueber (from German: über-, for 'over-' or 'supra-') is a genre of alternate universe fan fiction in which characters or events are portrayed somewhat closely to original canon but usually in a different time period, place, or reality, many times featuring the ancestors, descendants, or reincarnations of canon characters, known as uber-characters. The uber-characters' names are never canon. The term originated in the Xena: Warrior Princess fandom, coined in 1997 by Kym Taborn, the webmaster of the fansite Whoosh.org. This sort of story was used by the series itself, beginning with the second season episode "The Xena Scrolls". A common trend in Xena fanfics was to write Uber stories in which the characters' analogues discover that they are soulmates.
