= List of dragons in film and television =

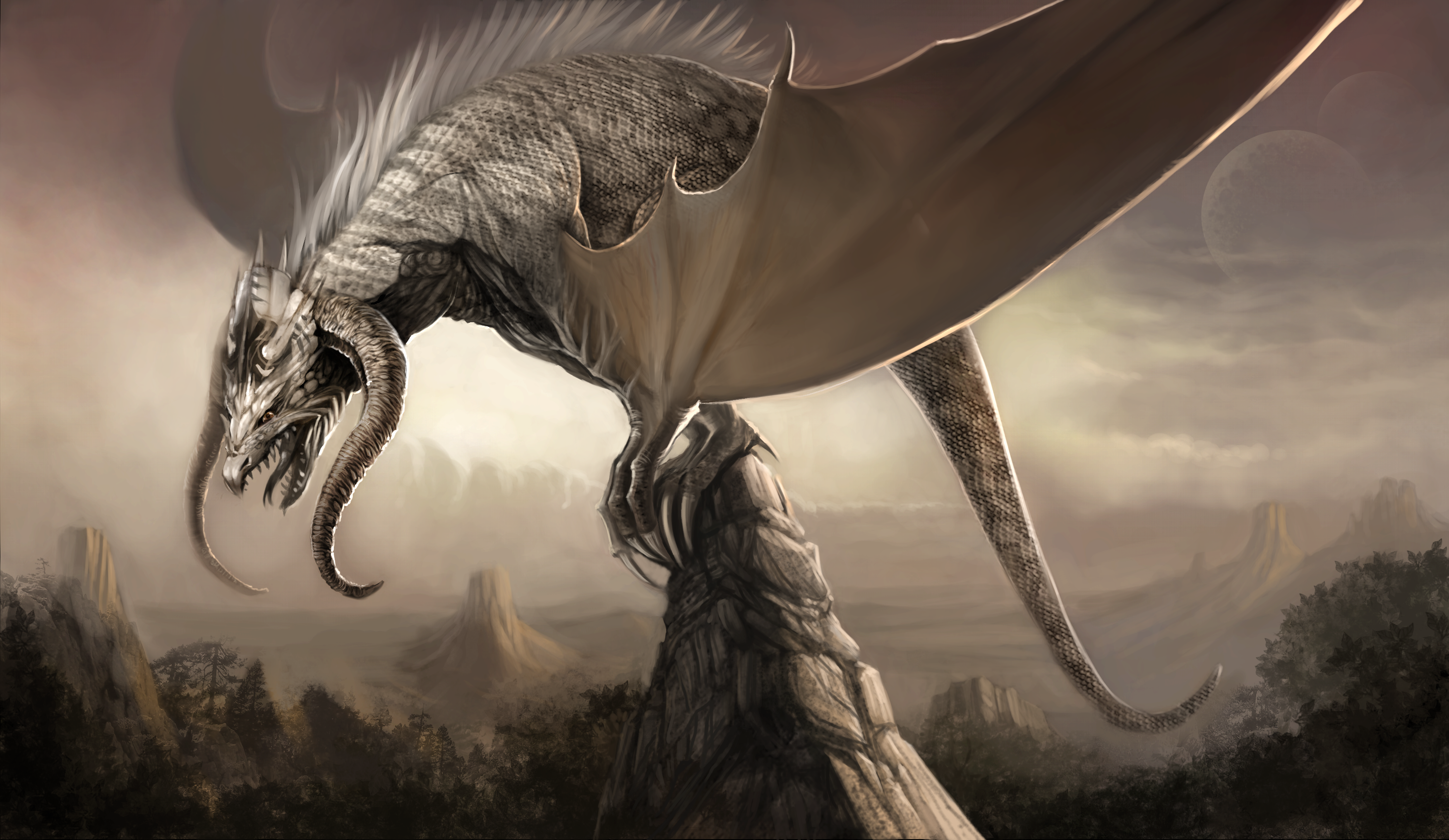
Concept-art done for Sintel, 3rd open-movie of the Blender Foundation. Artwork : David Revoy.

This is a list of dragons in film and television. The dragons are organized by either film or television and further by whether the media is animation or live-action. They are sorted alphabetically by name or if there is none, by the name of the media. Further information is the title of the media, the type of dragon, whether it transforms to/from something else, the voice actor if it has one and additional notes.

Dragon Types:

- European: 4 legged and winged. Common in films involving dragons being slain or ridden.
- Drake: 4 legged, not winged, and commonly possessing a short body. Frequent in 20th century animation when wing animation was difficult for the artists.
- Asian: 4 legged, not winged, and possessing a long body. Often found in anime, western animation and films with East Asian themes.
- Wyvern: 2 legged, winged. Common in films involving dragons being slain. Their popularity increased in the 21st century with the rise of live action CGI but the difficulty in animating classical 6 limbed European dragons remained
- Serpentine: has no legs or wings and frequently appearing in animation as a water monster
- Amphithere: has no legs but possesses wings. These are uncommon but usually associated with Quetzalcoatl or other Mesoamerican feathered serpent motifs
- Alien: Dragons with unusual alien physical appearance. These appear in Sci-Fi films
- Other: The Dragon has a shape not conforming to any of the above categorizations

== Dragons in film ==
=== Live-action film ===
Name of Dragon	Title of Film	Year	Type	Transforms, if so from what?	Voice Actor	Notes
Adelaid, Smite	George and the Dragon	2004	European	No		
Unnamed	Adventures Of Rufus - The Fantastic Pet	2020	Wyvern	No		
Unnamed	Age of the Dragons	2011	Wyvern	No		A gigantic albino dragon, various other dragons
Arman	On - drakon	2015	Wyvern	Human	Matvey Lykov (Note: Indicates they don't speak in dragon-form and thus may not be voice acted in dragon-form)	
Alina	Beyond Sherwood Forest	2009	European	Human	Katharine Isabelle	Transforms in sunlight due to curse
2 unnamed	Arabian Nights	2000	Asian	No		
Bahamut SIN	Final Fantasy VII: Advent Children	2005	European	No		
Bard	Baby Shakespeare	1999	European	No		A dragon puppet that hosts the video
Unnamed	Bright	2017	European	No		Seen from a distance flying over the city.
Bio Dragon	Dragon Fighter	2003	European	No		A genetically engineered, cloned 1,000-year-old dragon
Celestial Dragon	D-War	2007	Asian	Imugi		
Charizard	Detective Pikachu	2019	European	No		A Flying/Fire type Pokémon who battles Pikachu.
Unnamed	The Christmas Dragon	2014	Wyvern	No		
Condor Dragon	Ewoks: The Battle for Endor	1985	Alien	No		It gets temporarily knocked out by Wicket.
Unnamed	The Crown and The Dragon	2013	Wyvern	No		
Unnamed	Cry of the Winged Serpent	2007	European	No		
Dagahra	Rebirth of Mothra II	1997	European	No		
Unnamed	Damsel	2024	European	No	Shohreh Aghdashloo	
Darksmoke	Adventures of a Teenage Dragon Slayer	2010	European	Dog		
Unnamed	Detective Dee: The Four Heavenly Kings	2018	Asian	Stone pillar		
Diaval	Maleficent	2014	Wyvern	Raven	Sam Riley	
Dolvarnög dragon	Dragon Warriors	2015	Wyvern	No		
Draco; Drake, Griffin; Drago (Note: Real name "Hissyoxyillammochogannatoss"); Siveth	Dragonheart; Dragonheart: A New Beginning; Dragonheart 3: The Sorcerer's Curse; Dragonheart: Battle for the Heartfire; Dragonheart: Vengeance	1996, 2000, 2015, 2017, 2020	European	No; No, Human; No; Multiple Animals	Sean Connery; Robby Benson; Harry Van Gorkum; Ben Kingsley; Patrick Stewart; Helena Bonham Carter	
Unnamed	Dracano	2013	Wyvern	No		
Unnamed	Dragon	2006	Wyvern	No		
Dragon Army	Merlin and the War of the Dragons	2008	European	No		
Unnamed	Dragons of Camelot	2014	European	No		
Unnamed	Dragon Crusaders	2011	Wyvern	No		
Unnamed	Dragon Dynasty	2006	Wyvern	No		
Unnamed	Dragons: A Fantasy Made Real	2004	Multiple	No		A speculative documentary that looks at how dragons could have lived, behaved, evolved and gone extinct.
Unnamed	Dragon Fury; Dragon Fury: Wrath of Fire	2021, 2022	European, Wyvern; European	No		
Unnamed	Dragon Hunter	2017	Asian	No		
Unnamed	Dragon Knight	2022	European	No		
Unnamed	The Dragon Pearl	2011	Asian	No		
Unnamed	The Dragon Ring	1994	European	No		
Unnamed	Dragon Soldiers	2020	European	No		As well as breathing fire, can breathe a gas that possesses people.
Dragonstorm	Transformers: The Last Knight	2017	European [3H] (Note: Three-headed dragon)	Cybertronian		A three-headed combiner Cybertronian dragon made up of 12 individual Cybertronian Knights
Unnamed	The Dungeonmaster	1984	Amphiptere	No		are summoned in a combat scene.
Unnamed	Dwarves of Dragon Mountain	2018	Wyvern	No		Appears briefly in the beginning of the film.
Unnamed	Earthsea	2004	European	No	Peter Kent	
Eborsisk	Willow	1988	Hydra	Troll		dubbed "the Eborsisk" in honor of Roger Ebert and Gene Siskel
Elliott	Pete's Dragon	2016	European	No	John Kassir	Furry, Mammalian, sounds provided by John Kassir
Eustace Scrubb	The Chronicles of Narnia: The Voyage of the Dawn Treader	2010	European	Human	Will Poulter	
Fafnir	Die Nibelungen	1924	European	No		
Fafnir	Dark Kingdom: The Dragon King	2004	Drake	No		Slain by Siegfried
Fafnir	Die Nibelungen Part 1: Siegfried	1966/1967	European	No		
Unnamed, Fáfnir, Sockburn Worm, Rhodes dragon	Dragon Wars: Fire and Fury	2012	Multiple	No		A National Geographic documentary looking at various dragon myths.
unnamed red and gold dragons; Falazure; Unnamed	Dungeons & Dragons; Dungeons & Dragons: Wrath of the Dragon God; Dungeons & Dragons: The Book of Vile Darkness	2000, 2005, 2012	European; European; Wyvern	No	None; Unknown; None	Alignments depend on type of dragon
Falkor	The Neverending Story; The NeverEnding Story II: The Next Chapter; The NeverEnding Story III: Escape from Fantasia	1984, 1990, 1994	Asian	No	Alan Oppenheimer; Donald Arthur; Gord Robertson	
Fire Dragons	Thor: Ragnarok	2017	European	No		Flies via jet propulsion in place of wings, and is killed by Thor
Fire and ice dragons	Dragonquest	2009	European	No		
Unnamed	Free Guy	2021	Wyvern	No		Are seen briefly in the game Free Life
Alien Dragon/Bird	Evolution	2001	European	No		
Unnamed	Fire and Ice: The Dragon Chronicles	2008	Amphiptere	No		Fire and ice dragons
Ginko-Who-Soars	Dolittle	2020	European	No	Frances de la Tour	Guards the Eden Tree
King Ghidorah	Godzilla Series	1964–present	Wyvern [3H]	No		Godzilla's nemesis
Unnnamed	Goliath and the Dragon	1960	Drake	No		
Gorynych	Ilya Muromets	1956	European [3H]	No		
Great Dragon	Viy 2: Journey to China	2019	Asian	No		
Great Protector	Shang-Chi and the Legend of the Ten Rings	2021	Asian	No		1,000 years ago it saved the village of Ta-Lo from the soul-consuming demon known as the "Dweller".
Emperor Han	The Mummy: Tomb of the Dragon Emperor	2008	European [3H]	Human	Jet Li	
Unnamed	Hellboy	2019	Wyvern	No		Seen in a vision as Hellboy's mount.
Hydra	Hercules	2014	European [?H] (Note: Many-headed dragon)	No		
Hydra	Hydra	2009	European [?H]	No		
Hydra	Jason and the Argonauts	1963	European [7H]	No		
Hydra	Percy Jackson & the Olympians: The Lightning Thief	2010	European [5H]	Humans		
Unnamed	IF	2024	European	No		One of the residents of the IF retirement community, a cartoony dragon wearing glasses and a cast that is Benjamin's IF.
Unnamed	The Invincible Dragon	2020	Asian [9H]	No		
Jabberwocky	Alice in Wonderland, Alice Through the Looking Glass	2010	European	No	Christopher Lee	Slain by Alice
Jabberwocky	Alice in Wonderland	1985	European	No		
Jabberwocky	Jabberwock	2011	Wyvern	No		
Jabberwocky	Jabberwocky	1977	Wyvern	No		
Ladon	Shazam! Fury of the Gods	2023	European	No		Made of wood, breathes blue fire
Unnamed	King of the Lost World	2005	European	No		Main characters are offered as a sacrifice to them and giant ape.
Unnamed	The Last Dragonslayer	2016	European	No	Richard E. Grant	
Lingzun	Jade Dynasty	2019	Asian	No		
Unnamed	L.O.R.D: Legend of Ravaging Dynasties	2016	Various	No		
Liu Kang	Mortal Kombat Annihilation	1997	European	Human	Robin Shou	
Lockheed	The New Mutants	2020	European	No		A dragon from another dimension who is summoned by Magik.
Unnamed	The Lost Treasure of the Grand Canyon	2008	European	No		
Unnamed	The Magic Sword	1962	European [2H] (Note: Two-headed dragon)	No		
Maleficent	Descendants	2015	European	Human	Kristin Chenoweth	
Mother Malkin	Seventh Son	2014	Wyvern	Human	Julianne Moore	
Manda	Atragon	1963	Asian	No		
Mendax (Note: Full name "Navitatis Immutatio Puerili Mendax")	The Secret Kingdom	2023	Drake	Shroud	Matt Drummond	Has the ability to transform his body and grow a pair of wings.
Unnamed	Merlin	1998	European	No		
Mizuki	47 Ronin	2013	Asian	Human	Rinko Kikuchi	
Unnamed	The Monkey King 2	2016	Asian	No		Defeated by Sun Wukong
Unnamed	Mythica: The Darkspore	2015	Wyvern	No		
Norbert(a) Norwegian Ridgeback, Hungarian Horntail, Ukrainian Ironbelly	Harry Potter series	2001-2011	Wyvern	No		Norbert(a) was initially mistaken as a male in Sorcerer's Stone, Hungarian Horntail is encountered by Harry Potter in Goblet of Fire, Ukrainian Ironbelly is freed from Gringotts bank in Deathly Hallows Part 2
Olly	Stanley's Dragon	1994	European	No		
Orochi	Orochi, the Eight-Headed Dragon	1994	Asian [8H]	No		
Orochimaru	The Magic Serpent	1966	Asian	Human		Fights a giant spider and frog
Unnamed	P-51 Dragon Fighter	2014	Wyvern	No		
Pendragon	Jack the Giant Killer	1962	Wyvern	Human	Torin Thatcher	
Queen Narissa	Enchanted	2007	European	Human	Susan Sarandon	
Quetzalcoatl	Q	1982	European	No		
Quill Dragons	Dragon Storm	2004	Wyvern	No		Named for their ability to throw quills
Rakor, Themberchaud, Stone Golem	Dungeons & Dragons: Honor Among Thieves	2023	European	No, No, Stone Statue		A Black Dragon, an overweight Red Dragon, a stone statue brought to life by magic
Rathalos, Gore Magala	Monster Hunter	2020	Wyvern, European	No		
Unnamed	Reign of Fire	2002	Wyvern	No		The species is made up of thousands of females and a single much larger male.
Reptilicus	Reptilicus	1961	European	No		
Reptisaurus	Reptisaurus	2008	Wyvern	No		
Saphira, Shruikan	Eragon	2006	European	No	Rachel Weisz	
Sewer Dragon	Ghostbusters: Frozen Empire	2024	Asian			Tangible ghost
Shenron	Dragonball Evolution	2009	Asian	No		
Unnamed	Sinbad: The Fifth Voyage	2014	Drake	No		
Smaug	The Hobbit Trilogy	2012-2014	Wyvern	No	Benedict Cumberbatch	
Unnamed	The Sorcerer's Apprentice	2010	European	Dragon Dance Figure		
Unnamed	Sucker Punch	2011	Wyvern	No		
Unnamed	Superman	2025	Other	No		
Unnamed	Supernatural Events	2017	Asian	No		Chinese only release
Taro	The 7th Voyage of Sinbad	1958	Drake	No		
Unnamed	Tolkien	2019	European	No		Appears in war scene
Vermithrax Pejorative	Dragonslayer	1981	Wyvern	No		
Unnamed	Willy McBean and his Magic Machine	1965	European	No	Alfie Scopp	
Unnamed	Wyvern	2009	Wyvern	No		
Yamata no Orochi	The Three Treasures	1959	Asian (8H)	Human		
Yamata no Orochi	Yamato Takeru	1994	Asian (8H)	Human		
Yowler	Dragonworld	1994	Wyvern	No	Richard Trask	
Zephrak	Teen Knight	1999	Wyvern	No	Unknown	

=== Animated film ===
Name of Dragon	Title of Film	Year	Type	Transforms, if so from what?	Voice Actor	Notes
Unnamed	Animalympics	1980	Drake	No		Its fiery breath is used to light the Animalympics torch.
Argenta, Geraint, Karas	Dragon's Nest: Warriors Dawn	2014	European	Human, Human, No	Bianca Collins, Lucas Grabeel	
Animus	Fairy Tail: Dragon Cry	2017	Wyvern	Human	Makoto Furukawa / Michael Sinterniklaas	Several other dragons appear in flashbacks
Babe	Luck	2022	Drake[6L] (Note: Six-legged dragon)	No	Jane Fonda	A magical creature capable of sniffing out bad luck who is also the boss of the Land of Luck.
Beast Boy	Teen Titans Go! To the Movies	2018	Wyvern	Shapeshifter	Greg Cipes	Beast Boy transforms into a dragon during the climactic battle sequence.
Belle Bottom	Minions: The Rise of Gru	2022	Asian	Human	Taraji P. Henson	Leader of the Vicious 6
Beowulf's son	Beowulf	2007	Wyvern	Human	Ray Winstone	
Boris	My Father's Dragon	2022	European	No	Gaten Matarazzo	
Boris	Elmer's Adventure: My Father's Dragon	1997	European	No	Megumi Hayashibara	
Burner	The Seventh Dwarf	2014	European	No	Norm Macdonald / Daniel Welbat	
Devon and Cornwall	Quest for Camelot	1998	European [2H]	No	Eric Idle and Don Rickles	2 headed dragon
Unnamed	The China Plate	1931	Asian	No		
Dexter	The Dragon That Wasn't (Or Was He?)	1983	Drake	No		grows in size when he is angry or excited
Dingo	A Wizard's Tale	2018	European	No	Keith Wickham	Various other dragons also appear
Unnamed	Beowulf	1998	European	No		
Various	A Dragon Adventure	2019	European	No	Various	extremely low budget movie
Dragon	Belle	2021	Asian	No	Takeru Satoh, Paul Castro Jr.	An Avatar within the Virtual world "U".
Dragon	Burn the Witch	2020	Alien	No		only be recognized by humans in Reverse London
Dragon	Grendel Grendel Grendel	1981	Drake	No	Arthur Dignam	
Dragon	Shrek	2001-	European	No		Donkey's girlfriend, made children known as Dronkeys
Dragon	Where's the Dragon?	2015	Asian	No	Leehom Wang	
Dragon King	The Monkey King	2023	Asian	giant fat dragon	Bowen Yang	
Unnamed	Dragon Age: Dawn of the Seeker	2012	European	No		
Various	Dragonlance: Dragons of Autumn Twilight	2008	European	No		
Dragosha, Uncle Dra, Julias	The Princess and the Dragon	2018	European	Multiple Creatures, No, No	David Grout, Steve Elliot, Andrew Fribin	
Unnamed	Fantasia 2000	1999	Drake	No		Is seen along with a Unicorn and Griffin in the Pomp and Circumstance segment.
Unnamed	Dragon Hill The Magic Cube	2002	European	No		
Elliot	Pete's Dragon; The Search for Mickey Mouse; Once Upon a Studio	1977, 2002, 2023	European	No	Charlie Callas	
Firebottom	Welcome To Smelliville	2021	European [6L]	No	Tony Clark	The Oggly family pet.
Firedrake	Dragon Rider	2020	European	No	Thomas Brodie-Sangster	various other dragons also appear.
Genie	Aladdin	1992	European	Genie	Robin Williams	
Goliath	Dragon and Slippers	1991	European	No	Dom DeLuise	
Gorbash, Smrgol, Bryagh, Lunarian, Shen Zou, Various	The Flight of Dragons	1982	Multiple	No	James Gregory (Smrgol, Bryagh); Cosie Costa (Gorbash)	Gorbash is the house dragon, Smrgol is Carolinus' dragon, and Bryagh is Ommadon's dragon, there are many other unnamed dragons, including an Asian dragon named Shenzou ridden by one of Carolinus's brothers and a female dragon named Lunarian ridden by another of his brothers.
The Green Dragon	Scooby-Doo! and the Samurai Sword	2009	Asian	No	Brian Cox	
Gwythaints	The Black Cauldron	1985	Wyvern	No	Frank Welker	
Haku	Spirited Away	2001	Asian	Human	Miyu Irino, Jason Marsden	Haku is a river spirit that helps Chihiro
Hector	Lilly the Witch: The Dragon and the Magic Book	2009	European	No	Michael Mittermeier	
Herman	The Tale of Tillie's Dragon	1995	Drake	No	John Kassir	In some versions of the movie, an adult dragon attacks Tillie and Herman in a dream sequence.
Hookfang	How to Train Your Dragon	2010	Wyvern	No	No	He's a monstrous nightmare who constantly gets on his rider, Snotlout's, nerves.
Hydra	Hercules	1997	European [?H]	No		
John John, Marina, Vildrok	Dragones: destino de fuego	2006	European	No	Gianmarco Zignago, Silvia Navarro, Jésus Ochoa	
Unnamed	Journey to Saturn	2008	European	No		
Jozo	Brave Story	2006	Other	No		
Keroro, Dororo	Keroro Gunso the Super Movie 4: Gekishin Dragon Warriors	2009	European	Frog	Kumiko Watanabe, Takeshi Kusao	
Ladon	Hercules (GoodTimes Entertainment)	1995	European	No		Guardian of the golden apples in the Garden of the Hesperides.
Unnamed	The Last Unicorn	1982	Asian	No		Is slain by Prince Lír.
Lela	The Loud House Movie	2021	European	No	Jan Johns	
Unnamed	The Life and Adventures of Santa Claus	1985	Asian	No		
Unnamed	The Life and Adventures of Santa Claus	2000	European/Asian	Birds		
Unnnamed	The Little Dragon	2020	European	No		The baby dragon's siblings appear at the end.
Lollipop Dragon	SVE filmstrips	1970	Drake	No		
Long	Wish Dragon	2021	Asian	Human	John Cho	Revealed to be a human emperor who was turned into a wish dragon.
Long Danzi, Lu Yu, Diao, Kai	Dragonkeeper	2024	Asian	No, No, Human, No	Bill Nighy (Danzi), Anthony Howell (Diao)	
Ludmilla	Bartok the Magnificent	1999	Drake	Human	Catherine O'Hara	Transforms while singing after drinking a magical potion.
Madam Mim	The Sword in the Stone	1963	European	Human	Martha Wentworth	
Maleficent	Sleeping Beauty	1959	European	Fairy	Eleanor Audley	Defeated by Prince Phillip and the three good fairies Flora, Fauna and Merryweather with his sword the Sword of Truth
Lord Maliss	Happily Ever After	1989	Wyvern	Human	Malcolm McDowell	
Matches	Scooby-Doo and the Ghoul School	1988	Drake	No		
Unnamed	The Missing Link	1980	European	No	Bill Murray	
Mistral	The Tiger's Apprentice	2024	Asian	Human	Sandra Oh	
Mom, Fry	Futurama: Bender's Game	2008	European	Human	Tress MacNeille, Billy West	
Unnamed	Monkey King: Hero Is Back	2015	Asian	No		
Meatlug	How to Train Your Dragon	2010	European	No		A sweet gronkle, despite her fierce appearance. Her rider is Fishlegs.
Morgan le Fay	Scooby-Doo! The Sword and the Scoob	2021	European	Human	Grey Griffin	Revealed to be a Robot.
Mōryō	Naruto Shippuden the Movie	2007	Asian	No	Daran Norris	
Mushu	Mulan; Mulan II; Once Upon a Studio	1998, 2004, 2023	Asian	No	Eddie Murphy, Mark Moseley	
Nahina	Rebellious	2024	European	Human, Snake	Vanessa Johansson	A witch who serves Kezabor the evil sorcerer and kidnaps princess Mina for him.
Nimona	Nimona	2023	European	Multiple Animals	Chloë Grace Moretz	
Various	Prince Nezha's Triumph Against Dragon King	1979	Asian	No	Various	
Unnamed	Popeye the Sailor Meets Sindbad the Sailor	1936	Asian	No		
Orochi	Legend of the Millennium Dragon	2011	Asian	No		
Orochi	Wanpaku Ōji no Orochi Taiji	1963	Asian [8H]	No		
Unnamed	The Pagemaster	1994	European	No		
Penelope, Hugo	Barbie as Rapunzel	2002	European	No	Cree Summer, David Kaye	
Unnamed	The Pirates Who Don't Do Anything: A VeggieTales Movie	2008	Serpentine	No		
Po's chi	Kung Fu Panda 3	2016	Asian	No	Jack Black	Chi is ability to control spirit-like dragon which Po uses to defeat Kai
Professor Thurdigree Burns	Casper's Scare School	2006	European	No	Maurice LaMarche	
Puff the Magic Dragon	Puff the Magic Dragon	1978	Drake	No	Burgess Meredith	
Puffy, his mother, Drizelda	Tom and Jerry: The Lost Dragon	2014	European	No, No, Human	Vicki Lewis	
Purple Dragon	Noah's Ark	2007	European	No		
Unnamed	The Railway Dragon, The Birthday Dragon	1989	European	No	Barry Morse	Other dragons appear in Railway Dragon
Raiden the Moon King	Kubo and the Two Strings	2016	Asian	God	Ralph Fiennes	
Reggie	Free Birds	2013	Wyvern	Turkey	Owen Wilson	Briefly transforms into a baby dragon as a side-effect of time-traveling.
Reluctant Dragon	The Reluctant Dragon (1941 film); Once Upon a Studio	1941, 2023	Drake	No	Barnett Parker	
Ricky	The Hero of Color City	2014	European	No	Owen Wilson	A paper dragon who is the leader of the unfinished drawings.
Scales	Sintel	2010	Wyvern	No		
Servum	Godzilla: Planet of the Monsters	2017	Wyvern	No		A wyvern-like species that are related to Godzilla.
Shernomore	The Stolen Princess	2018	European	Human	Yevgen Malukha	
Sisu	Raya and the Last Dragon; Once Upon a Studio	2021, 2023	Asian	Human	Awkwafina	There are other dragons present in the movie as Sisu's Siblings
Slyder	Barbie & the Diamond Castle	2008	European	No	Mark Acheson	
Smaug	The Hobbit	1977	European	No	Richard Boone	
Spike	My Little Pony: Equestria Girls; My Little Pony: The Movie; My Little Pony: Best Gift Ever; My Little Pony: Rainbow Roadtrip	2013, 2017, 2018, 2019	European	Dog, Fish	Cathy Weseluck	
Spike (Note: Full name "Master Kenbroath Kilspotten Heathspike")	My Little Pony: The Princess Promonade; The Runaway Rainbow	2006	Drake	No	Brian Drummond	Was asleep in a cavern deep under the Celebration Castle for 1000 years waiting to declare the first person to touch his flower a princess.
Spike	My Little Pony: The Movie	1986	Drake	No	Charlie Adler	
Stormfly	How to Train Your Dragon	2010	Wyvern	No		She's a competitive deathly nadder who enjoys winning races with her rider, Astrid.
Unnamed	Stowaways on the Ark	1988	Drake	No	Unknown	A female dragon carrying an egg who attempts to embark on Noah's ark. She accidentally drops her egg and is kicked off the Ark
Tabaluga, Mythia, Tyrion	Tabaluga	2018	European	No	Wincent Weiss / Cameron Ansell, Ellen-Ray Hennessy, Rick Miller	
Tatsu	Taro the Dragon Boy	1979	Asian	Human	Sayuri Yoshinaga	
Therru	Tales from Earthsea	2006	European	Human	Aoi Teshima	There are other dragons as well particularly in the beginning and ending
Targon, Aroara, Thoron	Dragons: Fire and Ice; The Metal Ages	2004	European	No	Richard Newman (Thoron)	Many other dragons also appear
Toothless	How to Train Your Dragon	2010	European	No		The last night fury and Hiccup's dragon.
Unnamed	A Tree of Palme	2002	European	No		Palme's companion
Unnamed	A Warrior's Tail	2015	Wyvern	No		The mount of Anggee's father
Whimsey Weatherbe	My Little Pony: Twinkle Wish Adventure	2009	European	No	Keegan Connor Tracy	
World Gobbler	Dragon Hunters	2008	European	No		
Zmey Gorynych	Dobrynya Nikitich and Zmey Gorynych	2006	European [3H]	No	Oleg Kulikovich	
Zog, Madam Dragon	Zog	2018	European	No	Hugh Skinner, Tracey Ullman	Various other dragons also appear.

== Dragons in television ==
Appearance lists when the dragon appears

=== Live-action television ===
Name of Dragon	Title of Series	Year of Episode	Type	Transforms, if so from what?	Voice Actor	Appearances	Notes
Dragons of the Abyss and the Hudson and East Rivers	The Magicians	2015	Asian	No	Ambyr Childers, Sera Gamble, Ingrid Oliver	Recurring	
Aithusa, Kilgharrah	Merlin	2008	European	No	John Hurt (Kilgharrah)	Recurring	Aithusa is a young white dragon who sides with Morgana, Kilgharrah is a Great Dragon who was imprisoned under Camelot who aids and advises Merlin.
Albi The Racist Dragon	Flight of the Conchords	2007	European	No	Jemaine Clement	Drive By	
Arrax, Caraxes, Dreamfyre, Meleys, Moondancer, Seasmoke, Silverwing, Sunfyre, Syrax, Tessarion, Vermax, Vermithor, Vhagar	House of the Dragon	2022	Wyvern	No		Recurring	The skull of Balerion also appears.
Blothgaar	Power Rangers Operation Overdrive	2007	Asian	No	Charlie McDermott	Out of Luck	
Braxus	Hercules: The Legendary Journeys	1997	European	No	Unknown	The Lady and the Dragon	
Colchian Dragon	Jason and the Argonauts	2000	Drake	No		Part 2	Guards the Golden Fleece.
Cordelia	Angel	2004	European	No		Not Fade Away (Angel)	
Drageeen, Pyre, Tyrune	Mystic Knights of Tir Na Nog	1998	European	No		Recurring	
Drogon, Viserion, Rhaegal	Game of Thrones	2011	Wyvern	No		Recurring	Daenerys' dragons
Dudley	The Adventures of Dudley the Dragon	1993	European	No	Alex Galatis	Main	
Eustace Scrubb	The Chronicles of Narnia	1989	European	Human	David Thwaites	The Voyage of the Dawn Treader	Eustace later references his transformation in the final episode of the serial, The Silver Chair, when his party encounters a dragon.
Unnamed	Eureka	2012	Wyvern	No		The Real Thing	
Gorwen	Through The Dragon's Eye	1989	European	No	Seán Barrett (actor)	Main	
Dragreder and Dragblacker	Kamen Rider Ryuki	2002	Asian	No		Recurring	Contract Beast
H.R. Pufnstuf	H.R. Pufnstuf	1969	Other	No	Lennie Weinrib	Main	
Unnamed	Invisible	2024	European	No	David Verdaguer	Recurring	
Krayt Dragon	The Mandalorian	2020	Alien	No		"Chapter 9: The Marshal"	
Unnamed	Legacies	2018	European	Human		Recurring	
Maleficent, Lilith Page	Once Upon a Time	2011	European	Human	Kristin Bauer van Straten, Nicole Muñoz	Recurring	
Magellan	Eureeka's Castle	1989	European	No	Noel MacNeal	Recurring	
Unnamed	Monster Warriors	2006	European	No		Dawn of the Dragon!	
Oliver J. Dragon	Kukla, Fran and Ollie	1947	Drake	No	Burr Tillstrom	Main	
Many zords and monsters	Power Rangers/Super Sentai	1993	Multiple	No	Several	Recurring	
Read Alee Deed Alee	Read Alee Deed Alee	1994	Drake	No	Randy Carfagno	Main character	
Unnamed	The Sandman	2022	Wyvern	No	Nonso Anozie	Recurring	One of the Three Gatekeepers who guard the entrance to Dream's castle. Alongside a Griffin and Pegasus.
Scorch	Scorch	1992	European	No	Ronn Lucas	Main	A 1,300-year-old puppet dragon had his own ALF-esque sitcom
Shou-Lao	Iron Fist	2017	Asian	No		Episode "Dragon Plays with Fire"	Only his eyes are shown
Unnamed	Sliders	1996	European	No		Dragonslide	
Hypolyes, Cloverfield and two unnamed dragons	Supernatural	2011	European	Human		Like a Virgin	
Smirkenorff	Knightmare	1987	European	No	Clifford Norgate	Recurring	players were required to ride upon his back to the lower levels in exchange for a large gem stone
Unnamed	Special Unit 2	2001	European	No		The Drag	
Spot	The Munsters, Mockingbird Lane	1964	Wyvern	No		Underground Munster	pet dragon
Unnamed	Stargate SG-1	2006	Wyvern	No		The Quest	
Unnamed	Tic-Tac-Dough	1956	Other	No		Recurring	
Water Dragon	Mako Mermaids	2016	Asian	No		Recurring	Made out of water the Dragon's sole purpose is to turn Mermaids into humans by stealing their powers/tails.
Wick	Ninja Turtles: The Next Mutation	1997	European	No	Lee Tockar	Recurring	

=== Animated television ===
==== Western animated television ====
Name of Dragon	Title of Series	Year of Episode	Type	Transforms, if so from what?	Voice Actor	Episode	Notes
Adamai, Grougaloragran, Phaeris	Wakfu	2008	European	Human	Dorothee Pousseo, Benoit Allemane, Jean Barney	Recurring	
King Allfire, Queen Griddle, others	Blazing Dragons	1996	European	No	Several	Main Characters	
Prince Aragon, Princess Dora	Danny Phantom	2006	European	Ghost	Dee Bradley Baker, Susanne Blakeslee	Beauty Marked	
Asteroth	Mighty Ducks	1996	European	Human	W. Morgan Sheppard	The Return of Asteroth	
Unnamed	Avengers Assemble	2016	European	No		Into the Dark Dimension	
Azymondias, Zubeia, Avizandum, Sol Regem, Rex Igneous, Pyrrah, many others	The Dragon Prince	2018	European/Wyvern	No	Nicole Oliver, Adrian Hough, Chris Metzen, Ben Cotton	Main Character	Azymondias is a main character
Baby-san	Teenage Mutant Ninja Turtles 1987	1989	Asian	No		Usagi Yojimbo	
Unnamed Dragons	The Backyardigans	2008	European	No		Tale of the Mighty Knights, Tale of the Not-So-Nice Dragon	
Balthromaw	Rick and Morty	2019	Wyvern	No	Liam Cunningham	Claw and Hoarder: Special Ricktim's Morty	Several other named dragons also appear
Basil	My Little Pony Tales	1992	Drake	No		Slumber Party	
Beau, many others	Dragon Booster	2004	Multiple	No		Recurring	often used for competitive races and other sporting events
Belchy, unnamed	Jake and the Never Land Pirates	2012	Wyvern	No	Dee Bradley Baker	Cubby's Tall Tale, Jake Saves Bucky	
Unnamed	Ben 10: Alien Force	2008	European	No	Clancy Brown	Be-Knighted	A dragon-like alien mapmaker who was imprisoned by the Forever Knights
Unnamed	Bibi Blocksberg	2009	European	No		The Witches Horoscope	
Benedict	Animaniacs 2020	2020	European	No	Fred Tatasciore	How to Brain your Dragon	
Bird Dragon	Alvin and the Chipmunks	1990	Wyvern	No		Kong!	
Unnamed	Captain Planet and the Planeteers	1990	European	No		Beast of the Temple	
Cassie, Zak, Wheezie, Ord	Dragon Tales	1999	European	No	Chantal Strand, Jason Michas, Kathleen Barr, Ty Olsson	Main characters	Many other named dragons appear in some episodes of the show
Charmcaster	Ben 10: Omniverse	2014	European	Human	Kari Wahlgren	Third Time's a Charm	
Chinese Dragon	Garfield and Friends	1989	Asian	No	Gregg Berger	China Cat	
Chorlton	Chorlton and the Wheelies	1976	Other	No		Main Character	
Chroma Conclave	The Legend of Vox Machina	2023	European	No	various	Recurring antagonists	
Unnamed	Chuck's Choice	2017	European	Lizard		How to Restrain Your Dragon	
Cecil the Seasick Sea Serpent	Beany and Cecil	1962	Aquatic	No	Irv Shoemaker/Billy West	Main character	
Cledwyn, Unnamed, King Neptune the 8th, Neptune's mother, Various	Rupert	1994	European/Asian	No	Unknown, none, Billie Mae Richards, unknown, none	Rupert and the Knight, Rupert And The Dragon Festival, Rupert and the Sea Serpent, Rupert and the Dragon Race	
Crackle	Sofia the First	2013	European	No	Ellie Kemper	Recurring	
Crystal Dragon	Ben 10	2017	European	No		Shhh!	
Dagron	The Pirates of Dark Water	1992	Wyvern	No		The Dagron Master	
Darlene, Percy, Unnamed	Popeye the Sailor	1960	Drake	No	Unknown	Popeye and the Polite Dragon, Popeye and the Dragon	
Dennis	James the Cat	1984	European	No	Unknown	Recurring	
Destiny	Pucca	2008	Asian	No		Garu Hood	
Dezadore	Bo on the Go!	2007	European	No	Andrew Sabiston	Main Character	
Dagon	Ben 10: Ultimate Alien	2011	European	Squid	John DiMaggio	A Knight to Remember	
Dingo	Here Comes the Grump	1969	European	No		Main Character	
Dojo Kanojo Cho, Sapphire Dragon	Xiaolin Showdown	2003	Asian	No	Wayne Knight, Michael Donovan	Recurring	
Ninja Tribunal, Shredder	Teenage Mutant Ninja Turtles	2006	Various	Human	Sam Regal, Michael Sinterniklaas, Wayne Grayson, Greg Abbey, Marc Thompson*	Legend of the 5 Dragons	
Doom Dragon	Mighty Max	1993	Wyvern	No		Let Sleeping Dragons Lie!	
Doris	Henry's World	2002	European	No	Fiona Reid	Recurring	
Dragon	A Bunch of Munsch	1992	European	No	Mark Hellman	The Paper Bag Princess	
Dragon	Dragon	2004	European	No	Frank Meschkuleit	Main character	blue dragon
Dragon	Jane and the Dragon	2005	European	No	Adrian Truss	Main character	A 300-year-old orphaned dragon.
Dragon	Noah's Animals	1980	European	No	John Culhane	Last of the Red-Hot Dragons	An old dragon who is unable to breathe fire encountered by the animals of Noah's Ark.
Dragon	Skunk Fu!	2007	Asian	No	Rod Goodall	Recurring	
The Dragon; Evil Dragon; Ivanhoe	Teen Titans Go!	2016	European; European; Lindworm	No	unknown; David Kaye; Peter Rida Michail	Riding the Dragon; The Day the Night Stopped Beginning to Shine and Became Dark Even Though it Was the Day, parts 1–4; Hafo Safo	
Dragon	Wacky Races	1968	European	No		Recurring	in Creepy Coupe 2
Dragon Bolt	Hero Factory	2013	European	No		Brain Attack	
Dragonburn	Monsuno	2012	European	No		Recurring	
Dragoness	PopPixie	2011	European	No	unknown	Amore and the Quarreling Dragons	
Dragon Lord	Captain N: The Game Master	1990	European	No	Don Brown	The Trojan Dragon	
Dragon Toby Ephram, Ephram's mother	The Adventures of Puss in Boots	2015	European	No	Frank Welker, Laraine Newman	Dragon	
Shredder, Drako	Teenage Mutant Ninja Turtles	2003	Multiple	Human, No	Scott Rayow, Marc Thompson	Recurring	
Various Named Dragons	Dragon Flyz	1996	Multiple	No		Recurring	
Various	Dragon Hunters	2006	Multiple	No		Recurring	
Dragonous Humongous, Dreaded One	Disney's Adventures of the Gummi Bears	1985	Multiple	No		Some Day My Prints Will Come, The Magnificent Seven Gummies	
King Draykor	Wander Over Yonder	2014	European	No	Fred Tatasciore	The Hero	
Unnamed	The Dreamstone	1992	European	No		The Monster	
Druk, Ran and Shaw	Avatar: The Last Airbender	2010	Asian/European hybrid	No		Recurring	Masters of the Sun Warrior, others are fire nation familiar/spirit animal (not to be confused with Lion-Turtle)
Many	DreamWorks Dragons: The Nine Realms	2021	Multiple	No			
DTZ	Chip 'n Dale: Rescue Rangers	1989	Drake	Alien	Jim Cummings	Dale Beside Himself	The Character is an Alien Shapeshifter
Duffy	Jellabies	1998	European	No	?	Main Character	
Dulcy	Sonic the Hedgehog	1993	European	No	Cree Summer	Recurring	
Unnamed	Eek! the Cat	1997	European	No		Eekscalibur	
Elandra, Thorne, Zonya, Merina, Gust, many others	Lego Elves	2015	European	No		Recurring	
Ember	DC Super Hero Girls	2020	European	Human	Amanda C. Miller	The Fresh Princess of Ren Faire	
Iggy, Dedic	Planet Sketch	2005	European	No		Spaghetti	
Faffy	Dave the Barbarian	2004	Other	No	Frank Welker	Main character	pet dragon, other dragons appear in the show
Farfus	Mickey Mouse Funhouse	2021	European	No	Jan Johns	Recurring	A dragon who used to cause trouble in the village, but is actually playful.
Farting Dragon	Samurai Jack	2002	European	No	Clancy Brown	Jack and the Dragon	
Father	Codename: Kids Next Door	2008	European	Human	Maurice LaMarche	Operation: I.N.T.E.R.V.I.E.W.S.	
Figaro	Gumby Adventures	1988	Drake	No	Unknown	The Elephant and the Dragon	King Otto's watch-dragon
Fin Fang Foom	Iron Man	1994	Alien	No	Various	Recurring in multiple series	
Flamor	Mad	2010	European	No	Unknown	TransBOREmores 3: Dark of the Blue Moon / The Walking Fred	
Flurr, Slusho	Mixels	2014	Mixel	Mix, Max, or Murp	Phil LaMarr, Griffin Burns	Several	
Foghorn Draghorn	Tiny Toon Adventures	1990	Drake	No	Jeff Bergman	Ditch in Time	
Unnamed	Gawayn	2009	European	No	Unknown	A Pain in the Dragon	
Geldon	South Park	2001	European	No	Matt Stone	It Hits The Fan	
Glasburgh Dragon, Chinese Dragon	What's New, Scooby-Doo?	2004	Wyvern, Asian	No	John DiMaggio, Paul St. Peter	Large Dragon at Large, Block-Long Hong Kong Terror	A disguised robot, a disguised pickup truck
Granymyr, Various unnamed dragons	He-Man and the Masters of the Universe; She-Ra: Princess of Power	1983, 1985	European	No	John Erwin	Recurring, Darksmoke and Fire	
Green Dragon	Histeria	1998	Asian	No		China	
Great Wall of China	The Adventures of Super Mario Bros. 3	1990	Asian	Wall		7 Continents for 7 Koopas	The wall is turned into a dragon by the Mario Bros
Grimm	Princess Gwenevere and the Jewel Riders	1995	European	No	Peter Fernandez	Recurring	
Heart's Blood	CBS Storybreak	1985	European	No		Dragon's Blood	
Unnamed	Hello Kitty's Furry Tale Theater	1987	European	Cat		Rumpledogskin	
Unnamed	He-Man and the Masters of the Universe	2002	European	No		Dragon's Brood, To Walk With Dragons	
Unnamed	Honey Halfwitch	1965	European	No		Baggin' The Dragon	
Grisù Draconis	Grisù	1964-1975	European	No		Main character of TV series	
Groliffe The Ice Dragon	Noggin the Nog	1959	European	No	Oliver Postgate	Main character	
Idris	Ivor the Engine	1959	European	No	Olwen Griffiths	Main character	
Jake Long, various other dragons	American Dragon: Jake Long	2005	Multiple	Human	Dante Basco, others	Main characters	
Jana and Jason	Tenko and the Guardians of the Magic	1995	European [2H]	Human	???, Michael Sorich	Through the City Darkly	
Karnex Dragons	Star Wars Resistance	2019	Alien	No		Episode From Beneath	
Ke-Pa	Kung Fu Panda: Legends of Awesomeness	2012	Asian	Pig	Alfred Molina	Enter the Dragon	
King Wretch, Winged Wretch	The Last Kids on Earth	2019	Various	No	Rosario Dawson	Recurring	Dragon-like monsters that are the servants of the shows main villain Rezzoch
Kukulkan	Star Trek: The Animated Series	1974	Amphithere	No	James Doohan	How Sharper Than a Serpent's Tooth	
Ladon, Unnamed	Jason and the Heroes of Mount Olympus	2001	Drake, European	No	Unknown	Orions Belt, Laughter of the Sphinx	Guards the golden apples in the garden of Hesperides, The Sphinx's dragon Husband and several other dragons are brainwashed with magical collars by Dracchus
Unnamed	Laura's Star	2008	European	No	Unknown	Halloween	
Unnamed	The Legend of Zelda	1989	European	Lizard		The Ringer	
Unnamed	The Legends of Treasure Island	1995	European	No		Dragon	
Lindworm	Hilda	2018	Lindworm	No		Title theme, The Lost Clan	
Unnamed	Little Bear	1995	Asian	No	Unknown	Little Bear's Wish	
Little Big Guy	Rapunzel's Tangled Adventure	2020	European	No		Pascal's Dragon	
Unnamed	Looney Tunes	1955, 1978	Drake	No	Mel Blanc	Knight-mare Hare, Bugs Bunny in King Arthur's Court	
Megatron	Beast Wars: Transformers	1999	European	Cybertronian	David Kaye	Master Blaster	
Malchior	Teen Titans	2004	European	Human	Greg Ellis	Spellbound	disguises himself as the wizard Rorek
Malcho, Zin and Zang	Aladdin	1994	Amphithere, Asian	No, Human	Hector Elizondo, Brian Tochi	Rain of Terror, The Return of Malcho, Opposites Detract	Feathered Serpent
Mantigrue (Condor Dragon)	Ewoks	1985	Alien	No		The Haunted Village	
Mama Dragon, Various	The 7D	2014	European	No		Grim and the Dragon, recurring	
Medea, Multiple	Mythic Warriors	1999	Multiple	Goddess, No, No, No	Sally Cahill	Recurring	
Melty	Lilo & Stitch: The Series	2003	European	No		Melty	a.k.a. Experiment 228
Midgard Serpent	The Avengers: Earth's Mightiest Heroes	2011	Serpentine	No		A Day Unlike Any Other	
Morgaine le Fey	Batman: The Brave and the Bold	2009	European	Human	Tatyana Yassukovich	Day of the Dark Knight!	
Mr. Dragon	Ni Hao, Kai-lan	2008	Asian	No	Frank Welker	Dragonboat Festival	
Napalmeon, Moorna	Kaijudo	2012	Multiple	No	Grey DeLisle (Moorna)	Recurring	
Neceron, Gladius, Kobrax, Treek/Drakemon, Vlad, Artic, Petris	Dinofroz	2012	European	No	Andrea Ward	Main character	
Neddy	Adventure Time	2015	Candy	No	Andres Salaff	Bonnie and Neddy	
Nelly	Quack Pack	1996	European	No	Kath Soucie	Leader of the Quack	
Various	Ninjago	2011	Multiple	Darkness (The Overlord)	Scott McNeil (The Overlord)	Recurring	Character mounts
Ogre	Cap'n O. G. Readmore	1988	European	Ogre	Hal Smith	Cap'n O. G. Readmore's Puss In Boots	
Unnamed	Pac-Man and the Ghostly Adventures	2013	European	No		Betrayus Turns The Heat Up	
Unnamed	Paw Patrol	2016	European	No		Pups Save a Dragon	
Peepers	Dexter's Laboratory	2002	European	Dog	Tom Kenny	Jeepers, Creepers, Where Is Peepers?	
Pendragon	Huntik: Secrets & Seekers	2009	European	No		Recurring	
Penn Zero	Penn Zero: Part-Time Hero	2014	European	Human	Thomas Middleditch	Main Character	
Penny Fitzgerald	The Amazing World of Gumball	2011	European	Shape Shifting Fairy	Teresa Gallagher	Recurring	Cannot transform into it willing and is only able to do so when upset
Unnamed	Pink Panther	1968	Drake	No		Pink Valiant	
Pixiu	DuckTales (2017)	2017	Asian	Statue		Title theme, Woo-oo!	A dragon that consumes gold
Pocket Dragons	Pocket Dragon Adventures	1998	European	No	Various	Main Characters	
Pongo	Oswald	2001	Asian	No	Richard Kind	Pongo the Friendly Dragon	
Unnamed	Potatoes and Dragons	2004	Other	No	Mark Camacho	Main Character	
Power Dragon	Godzilla	1979	Wyvern	No		The City in the Clouds	
Predaking	Transformers: Prime	2010	European	Cybertronian	Peter Mensah	Main Character	other Predacons also turn into dragon forms
Prince Cinnamon Boots	The Replacements	2006	European	Mule	Daran Norris	The Majestic Horse	Pet Mule
Professor Thurdigree Burns	Casper's Scare School	2009	European	No		Dragon Quest	
Purple Dragon	Tom and Jerry Tales	2007	European	No	Unknown	Fire Breathing Tom Cat	
Razzle, Dazzle	Hazbin Hotel	2024	European	Demon		Recurring	
Unnamed	The Richie Rich/Scooby-Doo Show	1981	Asian	Statue		'Rickshaw Scooby	
Unnamed	The Ricky Gervais Show	2012	European	No		The English	
Queen of the Night	ABC Weekend Special	1994	European	Human	Samantha Eggar	The Magic Flute	
Unnamed	Sabrina's Secret Life	2004	European	No		What's In a Name?	
Sea Monster	Little Bear	1999	Serpentine	No	Unknown	Little Bear and the Sea Monster	
Shazzan, Unnamed, Unnamed	Shazzan	1967	European, Drake, European [2H]	Genie, No, Dragonfly	Barney Phillips, none	Main Character (Demon in the Bottle), The Underground World, Baharum The Befuddled	
Shendu, his son Drago	Jackie Chan Adventures	2000	Asian	No	James Sie, Michael Rosenbaum	Recurring	
Shorty	The Bashful Buzzard	1945	European	No	Mel Blanc	The Bashful Buzzard	
Simon, Valhalla Sea Dragon	The Little Mermaid	1992	Drake, European	No	Brian Cummings, none	Message in a Bottle, Heroes	
Various	The Simpsons	1989	Multiple	No	Several	Recurring	
Unnamed	Simsala Grimm	2010	European	No	Unknown	The Four Skillful Brothers	
Singe	Dragon's Lair	1984	Drake	No	Arthur Burghardt	Main Character	
Skippy	Goldie & Bear	2016	European	No		Fetch Skippy Fetch	
Unnamed	The Smurfs	1981	Drake	No		St. Smurf and The Dragon	Red baby dragon and his mother
Sneezing Dragon	Knighty Knight Bugs	1981	Drake	No	Mel Blanc	Knighty Knight Bugs	Yosemite Sam's (Black Knights) steed
Sorrowful, Brightstar	She-Ra: Princess of Power	1985	European	No	Erika Lane, John Erwin	Recurring, Darksmoke and Fire	
Soup Dragon	Clangers	1969	Drake	No	Oliver Postgate	Recurring	
Sparkie, Squirt	Mike the Knight	2011	European	No	Martin Roach, Andrew Sabiston	Recurring	
Sparky	Shirt Tales	1983	European	No		Kip's Dragon	Very young dragon
Spike, Princess Ember, Garble, Smolder	My Little Pony: Friendship Is Magic; My Little Pony: Make Your Mark	2010, 2023	Multiple	No	Cathy Weseluck/Martin Roach, Ali Milner, Vincent Tong, Shannon Chan-Kent	Recurring	An older version of Spike returns in Make Your Mark. Many other named and unnamed dragons also appear.
Spike	My Little Pony 'n Friends	1986	Drake	No	Charlie Adler	Main character	Many other dragons also appear
Spike	My Little Pony: Pony Life	2020	European	No	Tabitha St. Germain	Recurring	A spin-off of My Little Pony: Friendship Is Magic.
Spyro, Dark Spyro	Skylanders Academy	2016	European	No	Justin Long, Jason Ritter	Main characters	
unnamed	Star vs. the Forces of Evil	2018	European	No		Total Eclipsa the Moon	
Steel Wing	Mao Mao: Heroes of Pure Heart	2014	Wyvern	No	Tommy Blacha	I Love You Mao Mao	Other dragons appear as monsters
Stone Dragon	Gargoyles	1996	European	No		Pendragon	
Stuffy	Doc McStuffins	2012	European	No	Robbie Rist	Main character	Stuffed blue dragon
Unnamed	Sym-Bionic Titan	2011	Asian	No		Disenfranchised	
Tabaluga	Tabaluga	1997	European	No	Dietmar Wunder	Main character	
Tarragon	The Herbs, The Adventures of Parsley	1968	European	No	Gordon Rollings	Recurring	
Tiamat	Dungeons & Dragons	1983	European [5H]	No	Frank Welker	Recurring	
Tiamat, Unnamed	The Real Ghostbusters	1987	European	No		I Am the City, Egons's Dragon	
Tobias	The Reluctant Dragon & Mr. Toad Show	1970	Drake	No			
Toothless, many others	DreamWorks Dragons	2012	Multiple	No			
Vicky, Snowball, Timmy, Cosmo, Various	The Fairly OddParents	1999	European, European [3H], European, European, Multiple	Human, Bird, Human, Fairy, No		Main Character (The Fairy Flu!), This Is Your Wish, Main Characters (Fairy Fairy Quite contrary, Wishology!), Recurring	Antagonist, Cosmo's pet, Main characters, Many other dragons also appear
Warlock	Blackstar	1981	European	No		Recurring	
Weather Vane	Loonatics Unleashed	2005	Amphiptere	Human	Kaley Cuoco	Weathering Heights	
Various	Winx Club	2004	Multiple	No		Recurring	
Wip	Xcalibur	2001	European	No	Tom Clarke-Hill	Recurring	A small talking dragon
Woody Allen Dragon	Tiny Toon Adventures	1991	Drake	No	Maurice LaMarche	Brave Tales of Real Rabbits	
Zok	The Herculoids	1967	European	No	Mike Road	Main character	
Zook	Martin Mystery	2003	European	No		Mystery of the Vanishing	

==== Anime television ====
Name of Dragon	Title of Series	Type	Transforms, if so from what?	Voice Actor	Episode	Notes/Source
Unnamed	Aikatsu!	European	No		"Aikatsu!: The Targeted Magical Aikatsu Card"	
Aura, Vivian	Cross Ange: Rondo of Angels and Dragons	Wyvern	Human	Kotono Mitsuishi, Houko Kuwashima	Recurring	
Azzurro, Sylphid	The Familiar of Zero	European	Human	Satomi Arai	Recurring	Sylphid is a blue dragon
Bago	Zatch Bell!	European	No	David Rasner	Recurring	
Bahamut	Rage of Bahamut: Genesis	European	No		Recurring	
Various	Battle Spirits	Various	No		Recurring	
Various	Beyblade	Multiple	Tops		Recurring	
Blau	Panzer Dragoon OVA	Wyvern	No	Don'l Johnson	Recurring	
Bloody August	Sorcerous Stabber Orphen	European	Human	Emi Shinohara	Recurring	
Blue Dragon	Blue Dragon	European	No	Masaya Takatsuka	Main Character	
Blush	Live on Cardliver Kakeru	Multiple	No	Several	Recurring	
Bolshack Dragon	Duel Masters	European	No		Recurring	
B'T Raidou	B't X	European	No	Ryuji Mizuno	Recurring	
Celes	Tsubasa: Reservoir Chronicle	European	No		Sword of Demon Destruction	Kurogane's Kudan
Unnamed	Cardcaptor Sakura	European	No		Sakura and the Nameless Book	
Various	Cardfight!! Vanguard	European	No		Recurring	
Carmine	Dragon Century	European	No	Toshihiko Seki	Main character	
Many Dragon Type Pokémon	Pokémon	Multiple	Various Pokémon	Shin-ichiro Miki	Recurring	Dragon-types appear in some episodes such as Rayquaza, Dragonite, and Salamence
Chibisuke	Dragon Drive	Multiple	No	Chinami Nishimura	Main Character	Chibisuke is a baby white dragon, other dragons appear in the show
Devaul	Super Doll Licca-chan	European	Human	Eiji Takemoto	Recurring	
Drago, various others	Bakugan Battle Brawlers	Multiple	Sphere	Jason Deline	Main Character	Many other dragons appear in the show
Drago Ω1	Mazinger Z	Asian	No		Recurring	
Various	Dragonar Academy	Multiple	No	Various	Recurring	
Various	Dragonaut: The Resonance	Multiple	Human	Various	Recurring	Many characters have a dragon form
Dragon Cloth	Saint Seiya	Asian	Human		Recurring	
Dragon of the Darkness Flame	Yu yu hakusho	Asian	No		Recurring	
Dragon Kings	Sohryuden: Legend of the Dragon Kings	Asian	Human	Various	Main characters	
Dragon Warriors	Yona of the Dawn	Asian	Human	Various	Recurring	
Dramon-type	Digimon	Multiple	No	Various	Recurring	
Drum Bunker Dragon	Future Card Buddyfight	European	No	Brett Bauer	Main character	Other dragons include Drum Bunker's father and Jackknife Dragon
Elder Dragons	Didn't I Say to Make My Abilities Average in the Next Life?!	European	No	Various	Recurring	
Envy	Fullmetal Alchemist	Serpentine	Human	Wendy Powell	Laws and Promises	Homunculus turns into a dragon when he crosses the gate
Escaflowne	The Vision of Escaflowne	European	Robot		Recurring	
Esmeraude	Pretty Soldier Sailor Moon R	European	Human	Mami Koyama	Jealousy's Just Reward	
Falarion	Endride	European	No	Ayaka Ohashi	Recurring	Pet of Alicia
Fastener	Panty & Stocking with Garterbelt	Wyvern [2H]	Demon	Christopher Bevins	Chuck to the Future	
Filia Ul Copt	Slayers	European	Human	Houko Kuwashima	EP01	Ryuzoku
Fire Drake, Yurlungur	Zettai Bouei Leviathan	European	No		Recurring	
Five Ancient Dragons	Record of Lodoss War	Multiple	No		Recurring	
Flame Dragon	Gate	European	No		Episode 3	
Fredrika	Chaika - The Coffin Princess	European	Human	Chiwa Saito	Recurring	
Friedrich, Voltaire	Magical Girl Lyrical Nanoha StrikerS	Multiple	No	Mikako Takahashi (Friedrich)	Recurring	
Garyun, Dagwon, Wyverion	Dennou Boukenki Webdiver	Multiple	Transport	Several	Recurring	
Genryū	Naruto Shippūden: Dragon Blade Chronicles	Multiple	No		Recurring	
Gigano Dragon	Dinozaurs: The Series	Asian	Robot	Bob Papenbrook	Recurring	
Grandora	Shinzo	European [3H]	No		Ryuma, Lord of the Reptiles	
Great Red, Midgardsormr, Ddraig, Albion	High School DxD	European	No	Multiple	Recurring	
Grigori	Dragon's Dogma	European	No	David Lodge	Recurring	
Hakuryuu	Gensomaden Saiyuki	Wyvern	Jeep	Morota Kaoru	Recurring	Cho Hakkai's pet
Harumi	Planet With	European	Human	Mai Fuchigami	Avenger 2	
The Heraneion	Campione!	European	Stone Pillar		A Hero Arrives	
Hiryu	Bomberman B-Daman Bakugaiden	Asian	No	Kunihiko Yasui	Recurring	Pet black bomber
Hyōrinmaru, Kusaka	Bleach	Various	Human	Kenji Hamada, Keith Silverstein	Dragon of Ice and Dragon of Flame! The Strongest Showdown!	
Ian, Mugen	Battle Spirits: Saikyou Ginga Ultimate Zero	Other	No	Ryoko Shiraishi, Yuka Iguchi	Recurring	
Ice Dragon	Kirby: Right Back at Ya!	Other	No		Dedede's Snow Job	
Igneel, Acnologia	Fairy Tail	European	Human(Acnologia)	Hidekatsu Shibata/Jim White (Igneel), Kōsuke Toriumi/J. Michael Tatum (Acnologia)	Main characters	Many other dragons appear in the show.
Julia	Rave Master	European	Human		The Truth About the Dragon Race	
Kagutsuchi	My-HiME	Other	No		Recurring	The Child of Mai
Kanna, Tohru	Miss Kobayashi's Dragon Maid	Various	Human	Maria Naganawa, Yuuki Kuwahara	Main Characters	Other dragons appear in the show.
Karisu	Dragon Rider	European	Human	Ikue Ôtani	Main Character	
King of Dragons	Magi: The Labyrinth of Magic	European	No		Dungeon Baal	
Labyrinth Dragon	Little Witch Academia	European	No		Main Character	
Laika	I've Been Killing Slimes for 300 Years and Maxed Out My Level	European	Human	Rachelle Heger (English) Kaede Hondo (Japanese)	Main Character	Initially challenges Azusa and then is defeated and becomes her pupil.
Letty, Varney	Dragon Goes House-Hunting	European, Wyvern	No	Shun Horie, Kenjiro Tsuda	Main Character, recurring	
Lunie	Lord Marksman and Vanadis	European	No		Recurring	
Masotan	Dragon Pilot: Hisone and Masotan	European	No		Main Character	
Melan	DokiDoki! PreCure	European	Turtle	Fukagawa Seria	DDPC30	
Mandragon	Kami nomi zo Shiru Sekai	Other	No		Recurring	
Momonosuke	One Piece	Asian	Human	Ai Orikasa	Recurring	
Various	Mon Colle Knights	Multiple	No		Recurring	
Unnamed	Moomin	European	No		The Last Dragon on Earth	
Nidhogg	Accel World	Other	No		Episode 19	
Onyx	Dragon Crisis!	European	Human	Kamiya Hiroshi	Engage	
Papi	Dragon Collection	European	No	unknown	Recurring	
Peterhausen	Demon King Daimao	European	No	Jouji Nakata	Recurring	
Pina, X'rphan	Sword Art Online	European	No	Izawa Shiori	Recurring	
Pirate Dragons	Monster Rancher	European	No		Moo Revealed, Holly's Rescue	
Porunga	Dragon Ball	Asian	No	Various	Recurring	The Namekian counterpart to Shenron
Name Unknown	Power Stone	European	Human	Unknown	Crisis in the House of Falcon	
Quox	Tower of Druaga: the Aegis of Uruk	European	No		Recurring	
Ravendia	A Herbivorous Dragon of 5,000 Years Gets Unfairly Villainized	Drake	No	Houchu Ohtsuka, Xing Kaixin	Recurring	
Red Dragon	Delicious in Dungeon	2024	Drake	No	Recurring	Is responsible for eating Falin which kickstarts the story.
Rubrum	Amagi Brilliant Park	European	No	Jouji Nakata	"Not Enough Money!	
Ryoku	Hime Chen! Otogi Chikku Idol Lilpri	Asian	No	Risa Hayamizu	Recurring	
Ryūkotsusei	InuYasha	Asian	No	Kazuhiko Inoue	Father's Old Enemy: Ryukotsusei, The Backlash Wave: Tetsusaiga's Ultimate Technique	A dragon demon from whose inflicted wounds ultimately killed InuYasha's father
Selece	Magic Knight Rayearth	European	Robot		Revival of Selece, the Legendary Rune-God	
Serendipity	Serendipity the Pink Dragon	Other	No	Mari Okamoto	Main Character	Pink Dragon
Shenron	Dragon Ball	Asian	No	Various	Recurring	There are other forms of Shenron
Shiron, Ranshiin, and Greedo	Legendz	European	No	Kazuhiko Inoue	Main Characters	
Skeletal Dragons	Overlord	European	No		The Dark Warrior	
Sodom	The Betrayal Knows My Name	Other	No		Recurring	
Takaokami no Kami	Shounen Onmyouji	Asian	No	Atsuko Tanaka	The Flame of Kagutsuchi Shines Majestically	
Tama	Natsume's Book of Friends	Other	Human	Sayaka Aoki	A Chick Hatches	
Tong Tong	Pororo the Little Penguin	European	Giant feral dragon		Recurring	South Korean character
Unnamed	Those Who Hunt Elves	European	No		The Red One or the Blue One?	
Veldora Tempest	That Time I Got Reincarnated as a Slime	European	No	Chris Rager (English) Tomoaki Maeno (Japanese)	The Storm Dragon, Veldora	
Yatterdragon	Yatterman	European	No	Koichi Yamadera	Recurring	Robotic dragon
Various	Yu-Gi-Oh!	Multiple	No		Recurring	
Various	Zoids	Multiple	No		Recurring	
Zombie Dragon	The Rising of the Shield Hero	European	No		Curse Shield	

== See also ==
- List of dragons in games
- List of dragons in literature
- List of dragons in popular culture
- List of dragons in mythology and folklore
