= List of dragons in popular culture =

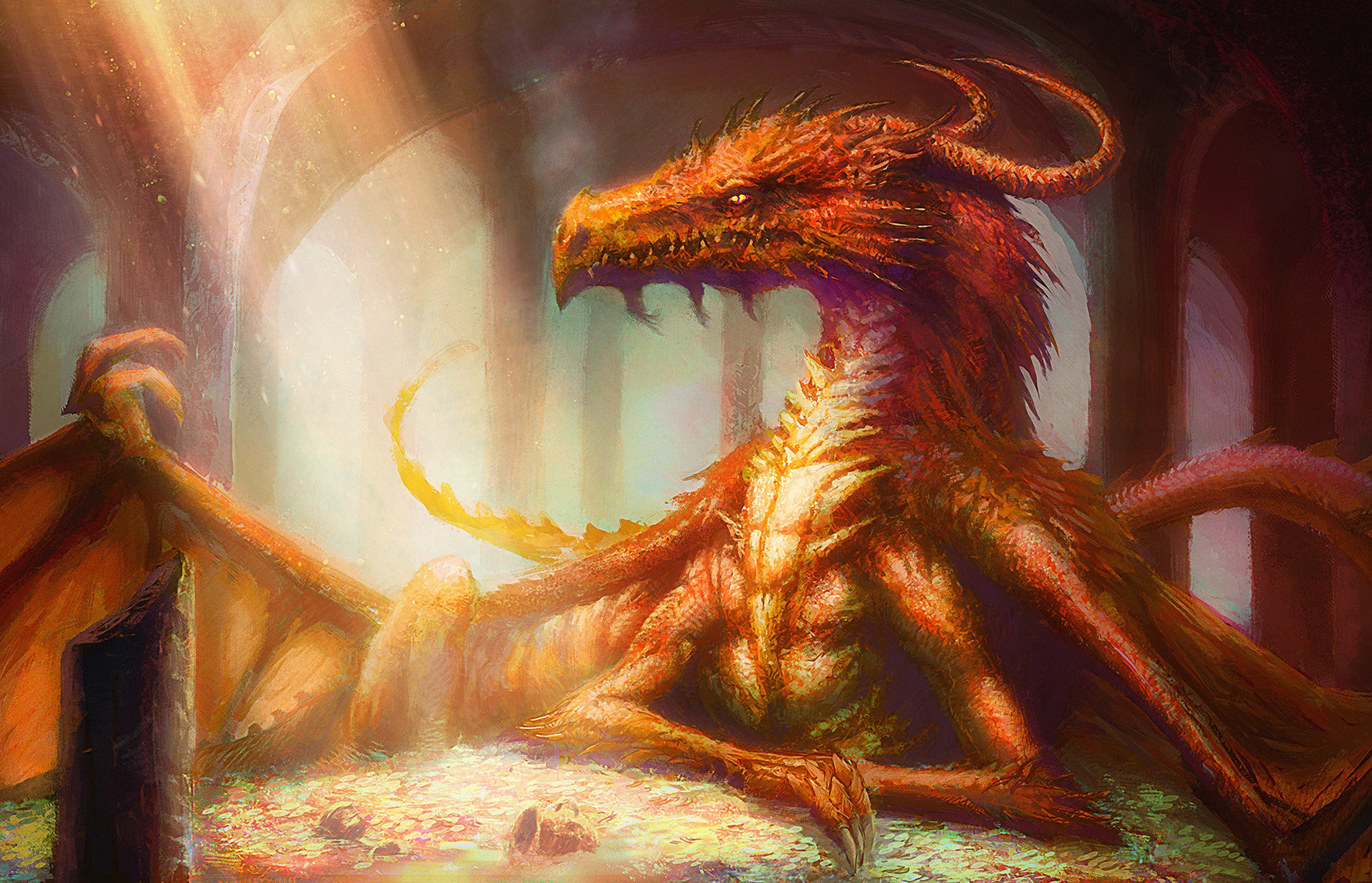
Modern fan illustration by David Demaret of the dragon Smaug from J. R. R. Tolkien's 1937 high fantasy novel The Hobbit

This is a list of dragons in popular culture. Dragons in some form are nearly universal across cultures and as such have become a staple of modern popular culture, especially in the fantasy genre.

== Dragons in fiction ==
This list of dragons in fiction is a list of draconic characters that appear in various works of fiction. It is limited to well-referenced examples of dragons in literature, comics, film, television, animation and video games.

=== Dragons in literature ===
Western literature tends either to affirm or pointedly subvert the traditional portrait of dragons from Western myth and folklore, as evil and greedy.

Name	Source	Author	Notes
Ancalagon the Black	Legendarium	J.R.R. Tolkien	The greatest of the winged dragons. Created by the Dark Lord Melkor and destroyed by Eärendil during the War of Wrath.
Balerion	A Song of Ice and Fire	George R.R. Martin	Nicknamed the black dread, he was the greatest dragon in Westeros history. Ridden by Aegon I Targaryen.
Caraxes	A Song of Ice and Fire	George R.R. Martin	Nicknamed the Blood Wyrm, he was a long serpentine red dragon. Ridden by Daemon Targaryen.
Chrysophylax Dives	Farmer Giles of Ham	Tolkien (Note: J. R. R. Tolkien)	A wily dragon who loses a battle of wills to Farmer Giles.
Dagurashibanipal	Grunts!	Mary Gentle	An ancient dragon, whose looted horde provides a tribe of orcs with the means to rise above their cannon-fodder station in the Evil Horde of Darkness.
Dragon	Jane and the Dragon	Baynton (Note: Martin Baynton)	An orphaned 300-year-old dragon and friend of Jane.
Drogon	A Song of Ice and Fire	George R. R. Martin	A black-red dragon, hatched by Daenerys Targaryen. The largest and most vicious of her three dragons.
Ember Hill	Talon Saga	Julie Kagawa	Modern dragon.
Errol	Guards! Guards!	Pratchett (Note: Terry Pratchett)	Small, underdeveloped dragon given to the Watch of Ankh-Morpork as a mascot by Sybil Ramkin.
Faranth	Dragonriders of Pern	McCaffrey (Note: Anne McCaffrey)	The last gold dragon hatched from the first dragon hatching on Pern, and the most influential dragon in Pernese history.
Fírnen	Inheritance	Paolini (Note: Christopher Paolini)	A green, young, and kind dragon who has Arya as his rider.
Fitz	Miss Percy's Pocket Guide to the Care and Feeding of British Dragons	Quenby Olson	The first dragon hatched in at least a thousand years, when dragons have long been considered only myths.
Glaedr	Brisingr	Paolini	An old, golden, and wise dragon who had Oromis as his rider.
Glaurung	The Silmarillion	Tolkien	A wingless dragon who is the first of the dragons, and the main antagonist in the tale of The Children of Húrin. Can manipulate human minds.
Gleep	MythAdventures	Robert Asprin	A baby dragon who befriends the series protagonist Skeeve.
Griffin	Griffin the Dragon	Ken Mask	A dragon who learns morals from wrongdoing, such as lying and bullying.
Heavenly Beings	Sorcerous Stabber Orphen	Yoshinobu Akita	Humanlike dragons.
Icefyre	The Tawny Man	Hobb (Note: Robin Hobb)	A black male dragon buried under ice who breaks free to mate with Tintaglia, a blue dragon, to save the dragon race.
Igjarjuk	Memory, Sorrow, & Thorn	Williams	An ancient ice dragon who dwells far in the north of Osten Ard.
Katla	The Brothers Lionheart	Lindgren (Note: Astrid Lindgren)	A fictional female dragon from the Swedish children's book.
Kazul	Dealing with Dragons	Patricia C. Wrede	A fictional dragon from the young adult fantasy novel, Dealing with Dragons, the first book in the Enchanted Forest Chronicles series. The novel chronicles the adventures of the princess Cimorene, who escapes her ordinary family to become the princess of the dragon Kazul. Kazul assigns Cimorene to cook for her and organize her library and treasure hoard.
Meleys	A Song of Ice & Fire	George R. R. Martin	A huge scarlet she dragon with pink membranes nicknamed the Red Queen. She was ridden by the queen who never was, Rhaenys Targaryen.
Meraxes	A Song of Ice & Fire	George R. R. Martin	One of Aegon I Targaryen's Dragons. A silver she dragon ridden by his sisterwife, Rhaenys Targaryen.
Mnementh	Dragonriders of Pern	McCaffrey	A bronze dragon ridden by F'lar, Weyrleader of Benden Weyr.
Montague Bunsen-Burner	Dragon Boy	King-Smith (Note: Dick King-Smith)	A dragon on a human-free diet who finds and raises an orphaned boy John. He has a wife named Albertina and gains a daughter named Lucky.
Moon	Baby Unicorn and Baby Dragon	Marzollo (Note: Jean Marzollo)	A young dragon named for the crescent mark on his head. Became a great friend of Star after the Eight-Horn Friendship Spell in the prequel The Baby Unicorn.
Unnamed dragon	Beowulf	Unknown	A dragon who battles with and is slain by Beowulf.
Niner	The Eyes of The Dragon	Stephen King	A dragon slain by King Roland, ruler of Delain, the head of which hangs as a trophy in the King's study. Through a secret passageway, one can peer through the eyes of the dragon head and into the King's quarters.
Norberta	Harry Potter and the Philosopher's Stone	Rowling (Note: J.K. Rowling)	Previously named Norbert, she is a Norwegian Ridgeback dragon that Hagrid acquired as an egg from a stranger in the Hog's Head. Hagrid raises Norbert until Harry, Ron, and Hermione finally persuade Hagrid to send the dragon to Ron's older brother Charlie. Hagrid later learns that the dragon is female and has been renamed Norberta.
Pyralspite	Homestuck	Andrew Hussie	The companion of Neophyte Redglare.
Ramoth	Dragonriders of Pern	McCaffrey	The golden queen dragon ridden by Lessa of Benden Weyr and Ruatha Hold.
Reluctant Dragon	The Reluctant Dragon (short story)	Kenneth Grahame	A friendly and intelligent poetry-loving dragon.
Rhaegal	A Song of Ice and Fire	George R. R. Martin	A green-bronze dragon, recently hatched by Daenerys Targaryen.
Ruth	Dragonriders of Pern	McCaffrey	A white dragon, one of a kind in Pern, ridden by Lord Jaxom of Ruatha Hold. Has an unusually acute memory. Instrumental in the final end of Thread.
Saphira	Eragon	Paolini	A kind, fierce, and blue dragon who has Eragon as her rider.
Selendrile	Dragon's Bait	Vivian Vande Velde	A dragon with shapeshifting powers who decides to help a woman get revenge on the villagers who sacrificed her to him after she was accused of witchcraft.
Slathbog	Slathbog's Gold	Mark Forman	An evil dragon with a large hoard of gold, who Alex and his company of Adventurers seek to kill for his evil deeds and to take the hoard for themselves. Alex kills him after looking him in the eye to prove dominance over him.
Shurakai	Memory, Sorrow, & Thorn	Williams	The great red dragon of the Hayholt, who was eventually turned into the Dragonbone Chair, and killed three kings of the Hayholt before being mythically slain by High King Prester John.
Smaug	The Hobbit	Tolkien	A greedy and wicked golden-red dragon who slaughtered Thrór's dwarf clan along with the town of Dale and took the dwarves' treasure. As Bilbo Baggins talked with Smaug, he found a weak spot in Smaug's impenetrable scales. Hearing this from the Thrush, the archer Bard killed Smaug.
Sparkles	Goosebumps Series 2000: Be Afraid — Be Very Afraid!	R.L. Stine	Sparkles is a sentient dragon who was drawn by Emily to play in Connor's board game, which his friends insist on playing, despite his objections. Emily draws the cards needed to become a dragon, and the dragon manifests in reality before being defeated after Connor slides the dragon's cards back into the box.
Sunfyre	A Song of Ice and Fire	George R.R. Martin	Nicknamed Sunfyre the Golden, he was a gold dragon with pink wing membranes and ridden by King Aegon II Targaryen.
Syrax	A Song of Ice and Fire	George R.R. Martin	Syrax was a yellow dragoness rode by Queen Rhaenyra Targaryen.
Temeraire	Temeraire	Novik (Note: Naomi Novik)	A black Chinese Celestial whose captain is William Laurence.
Terezi's Lusus	Homestuck	Andrew Hussie	Unborn parent figure and psychic mentor to Terezi Pyrope.
Thorn	Eldest	Paolini	A red, immature, and vicious dragon who has Murtagh as his rider.
Tintaglia	The Liveship Traders	Hobb	A female blue dragon, believed to be the last of her kind. She ultimately mates with Icefyre and saves the dragon race.
Eldrax	The Paper Bag Princess	Robert Munsch (Note: Robert Munsch)	A dragon who destroys Princess Elizabeth's kingdom and kidnaps her beloved Prince Ronald. Princess Elizabeth defeats the dragon by getting him to show off his full skills, exhausting him.
Viserion	A Song of Ice and Fire	George R. R. Martin	A cream-white dragon, recently hatched by Daenerys Targaryen.
Vhagar	A Song of Ice and Fire	George R. R. Martin	One of the dragons of Aegon I Targaryen. A bronze she-dragon rode by his sisterwife Visenya Targaryen. Was also ridden by Laena Velayron and Aemond Targaryen.
Various dragons	The Frog Princess (novel) and its sequels	E. D. Baker	Various dragons with the ability to speak; some can transform into humans and back.
Various dragons	Talon Saga	Julie Kagawa	Various dragons can shift into human form and act like them.
Various dragons	Wings of Fire (novel series)	Tui T. Sutherland	Epic children's fantasy series which features dragons as the heroes of each story.
Villentretenmerth	The Witcher, Sword of Destiny	Andrzej Sapkowski	A golden dragon, possibly the only of his kind, who travels with a pair of Zerrikania warrior woman while shapeshifted and assuming the false name Borch three Jackdaws.
Festus	The Heroes of Olympus	Rick Riordan	A mechanical dragon, made by the ninth cabin to protect Camp Half-blood. In The Lost Hero, it was found by Leo.
Zog	Zog (children's book)	Julia Donaldson	A keen yet accident prone young dragon trying to earn a gold star at dragon school; also an animated short film by the BBC.

Author name legend

=== Dragons in comics ===
Dragons appear in various manga and American comics, in the form of comic books, comic strips and webcomics.

Name	Origin	Notes
Acnologia	Fairy Tail	Acnologia, also known as The Black Dragon, and fearsomely reputed as The Black Dragon in the Book of Apocalypse and the Herald of New Ages, is a cataclysmically powerful Dragon Slayer that can take the form of a dragon. It assaulted the Fairy Tail core Mages on Tenrou Island in the Year X784.
Albion	High School DxD	Albion is one of the Two Heavenly Dragons and the arch-rival of Ddraig. He is called the White Dragon, also known as the Vanishing Dragon, Dragon Gwiber, White Dragon Emperor, and White Dragon Emperor of Supremacy. He is currently residing within the Longinus, Divine Dividing, wielded by Vali Lucifer. Like his arch-rival Ddraig, he is also feared among Angels, Fallen Angels, Devils and the various factions in the world for his destructive powers, which are said to be able to kill both Gods and Satans.
Alfred	XDragoon	In the webcomic, Rocky and Alfred are humanoid dragons from the planet Gan-Mah.
Chibisuke	Dragon Drive	Chibisuke and various other dragons appear in the series.
Cordelia	Angel	
Dev	Part Time Dragons	A dragon who dreams of becoming a successful game developer.
Dragon	Slylock Fox & Comics for Kids	An unnamed dragon appears in several strips, including "How to Draw", "Six Differences", and "True or False".
The Dragon	Sinfest	Created by Tatsuya Ishida.
Dragon Man	Fantastic Four	An android created by Professor Gregson Gilbert who resembles a humanoid dragon.
Ddraig	High School DxD	Ddraig is one of the Two Heavenly Dragons and the arch-rival of Albion. He is called the Red Dragon, also known as the Welsh Dragon, Dragon Goch, Red Dragon Emperor, and Red Dragon Emperor of Domination, who resides within the Longinus, Boosted Gear, wielded by Issei Hyoudou. He is feared among the Angels, Fallen Angels, Devils and the various other factions in the world for his destructive powers, which are said to be able to kill both Gods and Satans.
Dragon of the Moon	Defenders	An ancient demon who resembles a dragon. It corrupted Heather Douglas (Moondragon) over the course of several years, which caused her to temporarily transform into a creature resembling the dragon.
Dulcy	Sonic the Hedgehog	
Fafnir	Thor	First encountered in the guise of an old man by the warrior Volstagg. Drinks magical water which transforms him into a dragon and possesses powers of illusion. Attempts to devour the Asgardians, but is defeated by Odin's son Thor.
Fin Fang Foom	Strange Tales #89 (Oct. 1961)	Member of a race of alien dragons, the Kakaranatharans.
Grandeeney	Fairy Tail	A sky dragon. Foster parent of Wendy Marvell, the sky dragon slayer.
The Great Red Dragon	Bone	Created by Jeff Smith.
Genryū	Naruto	The Genryu are five legendary dragons that represent the five elemental natures: earth, water, wind, fire, and lightning.
Igneel	Fairy Tail	Foster father of Natsu Dragneel, who taught him a rare ancient magic called 'fire dragon slayer magic'.
Kaido	One Piece	One of the powerful pirate emperors and the main antagonist of the Wano Country Arc, renowned as the world's strongest creature, having transformed into a serpentine Azure Dragon after eating the Devil Fruit. He breathes fire, creates clouds that allow him to move through the air, releases sharp blades by blowing, and creates lightning with his roar.
Lockheed	X-Men	A dragon-like alien who is the longtime companion of Kitty Pryde.
Kozuki Momonosuke	One Piece	A young samurai who can turn into a dragon.
Llewellyn	Ozy and Millie	Created by Dana Simpson.
Long	DC Comics	The leader of a Chinese gang with ties to the Penguin. When Batwing and Nightwing arrived in Beijing to investigate a conspiracy related to one of Penguin's black market dealings, Long ambushed them, transforming into a dragon.
Malefor	Skylanders	The Undead Dragon King, Malefor, is the self-crowned Lord of the Undead and ruler of the Underworld. Adapted from his appearances in The Legend of Spyro series, this version of the character first appears in the backstories of Skylanders Spyro, Cynder, and Hex before his defeat by the latter. He then returns in the IDW story arc, Return of the Dragon King, in which he brutally attacks Skylander Academy. During the attack, his tail is tied to the anchor of the Dread-Yacht, which then gets tossed off the edge of the island, dragging him with it back down to the lower parts of Skylands.
Metalicana	Fairy Tail	An iron dragon. Foster parent of Gajeel Redfox, the iron dragon slayer.
Ming	Rupert Bear	Pet dragon of Pong Ping. Voiced by Alfred Bestall.
Nid Hogg	Angel Sanctuary	
Porunga	Dragon Ball	Porunga is a dragon created by the grand Namekian elder to grant three wishes to anyone who can gather seven spheres known as the Dragon Balls. May revive only one deceased person per wish; however that limit was later removed.
Pyralspite	Homestuck	The companion of Neophyte Redglare. Created by Andrew Hussie.
Rocky	XDragoon	
Sennenryu	One Piece	Sennenryu appears in the anime in the Warship Island Arc.
Shenron (Shenlong)	Dragon Ball	Created by Kami, the god of Earth, to grant a single wish to anyone who can gather seven spheres known as the Dragon Balls. Limited to only one wish per person, later expanded to two. Cannot grant the same wish twice, resurrect those who have died of natural causes, or grant a wish that exceeds the power of his creator.
Shou-Lao	Iron Fist	An immortal Chinese red dragon who is the final test for an Iron Fist candidate. Those who defeat the dragon in combat are allowed to absorb his power by touching his molten heart, which is contained in a brazier.
Skiadrum	Fairy Tail	A shadow dragon and foster father of Rouge Cheney, the shadow dragon slayer.
Tohru	Miss Kobayashi's Dragon Maid	Tohru fell in love with and became the maid of Miss Kobayashi after being saved from a near-fatal injury by the latter; her presence in Kobayashi's world ends up attracting more dragons from Tohru's native realm, all of whom go on to befriend Kobayashi and company despite harboring racist beliefs towards humans.
Weisslogia	Fairy Tail	A white dragon and foster father of Sting Eucliffe, the white dragon slayer.
Wormy	Wormy	Created by David A. Trampier.

=== Dragons in film ===
Dragons have been portrayed in film and television in many different forms. They may terrorize human towns, or save human lives, even taking the role of passionate protectors.

Name	Film	Notes
Bio Dragon	Dragon Fighter	A fire-breathing dragon known as the Bio Dragon or Genetic Dragon. Horned and spined, with dark grey coloring.
Buraki	Dragon Wars	Main antagonist of Dragon Wars (2007). Leader of an army of dragons, dinosaurs, and frog-like creatures. Ruthless, despised, and malevolent.
Dagahra	Rebirth of Mothra II	Battles Mothra. Transforms into Rainbow Mothra.
Desghidorah	Rebirth of Mothra	A Japanese fiction monster that resembles King Ghidorah and is the main antagonist of the film. He attempts to destroy Earth, but is defeated by Mothra and sealed within Earth.
Draco	Dragonheart	The last remaining dragon. Voiced by Sean Connery.
Drake, Griffin	Dragonheart: A New Beginning	Voiced by Robby Benson and Harry Von Gorkum, respectively.
Dragonstorm	Transformers: The Last Knight	A three-headed combiner Cybertronian dragon made up of twelve individual Cybertronian Knights.
Fafnir	Die Nibelungen	An adaption of the Nibelung legend. The dragon is notable for being one of the first dragons in film.
Falkor	The Neverending Story	A Luckdragon and friend of Atreyu and Bastian, who has distinctive canine features. He is the only luckdragon to appear, although five others are mentioned in passing. He has red eyes and an elongated, winged body, with many white scales and hairs on the length of his body that can appear pink.
Ginko-Who-Soars	Dolittle	A dragoness who guards the fruits of Eden after her husband's death. She was initially suspicious of humans, but came to see Dolittle as a friend after he cured her of stomach ache. Voiced by Frances de la Tour.
Golden Dragon	Beowulf	Born from Grendel's mother and son of Beowulf.
Grand King Ghidorah	Rebirth of Mothra III	Giant three-headed winged dragon. Battles Mothra; destroyed by Armor Mothra.
Keizer Ghidorah	Godzilla: Final Wars	Giant quadrupedal three-headed winged dragon and the last monster to be encountered by Godzilla. First appeared as a bipedal skeleton monster known as Monster X.
King Ghidorah	Godzilla	A kaiju, a fictional Japanese monster featured in several of Toho Studios' Godzilla films. King Ghidorah appears as an armless, three-headed, two-tailed, bipedal dragon with large bat-like wings.
Siveth	Dragonheart: Vengeance	Voiced by Helena Bonham Carter.
Smaug	The Hobbit film series	A powerful, intelligent, and vicious dragon who terrorizes the people of Dale, Lake-town, and the Dwarves of Erebor. Voiced by Benedict Cumberbatch.
The Dragon Spirit	The Last Airbender	A dragon spirit who acts as guide to Aang. A new composite character taking over the roles of Avatar Roku, Fang, Koh, and Guru Pathik from the animated series. Voiced by John Noble.
The Great Protector	Shang-Chi and the Legend of the Ten Rings	A mythical dragon who protects Ta Lo and its citizens from the Dweller-in-Darkness.
Vermithrax Pejorative	Dragonslayer	A flying red dragon who demands tribute from the Kingdom of Urland. Hero Galen Bradwarden learns, however, that Vermithrax is using the sacrifices to feed its young—three red dragon hatchlings.
Unnamed dragons	Reign of Fire	Various dragons feature prominently as dangerous animals throughout the film.
Various Dragons	Super Sentai and Power Rangers	Various depictions of both eastern dragons and European dragons are seen as mecha or zords from both series, some having their own warrior/megazord mode. Most prominently appearing is the Ryusei Oh/Red dragon Thunderzord from Gosei Sentai Dairanger or Mighty Morphin Power Rangers.

=== Dragons in television ===
Name	Series	Notes
Aithusa	Merlin	A young white dragon that is rescued, hatched, and named by Merlin. It later saves Morgana's life by healing her wounds.
Caraxes	House of the Dragon	Nicknamed the Blood Wyrm, he was a long serpentine red dragon. Rode by Daemon Targaryen.
Drogon	Game of Thrones	A black-red dragon hatched by Daenerys Targaryen. It is the largest and most vicious of her three dragons.
Kilgharrah	Merlin	An ancient dragon (voiced by John Hurt) imprisoned by Uther Pendragon below Camelot. Thought to be the last of its kind.
Meleys	House of the Dragon	Nicknamed the Red Queen, she was a scarlet dragon with pink wing membranes. Rode by the Queen who never was, Rhaenys Targaryen.
Mizunoeno Dragon	Ultraman Gaia	Mizunoeno Dragon (ミズノエノリュウ, Mizunoeno Ryū), also known as "Mizunoeryu," is a monster that appeared in the TV series, Ultraman Gaia. He appeared in episodes 11, 50, and 51.
Natsunomeryu	Ultraman Max	Natsunomeryu (ナツノメリュウ, Natsunomeryuu), also known as Natsunome Dragon, is a peaceful dragon kaiju that slept in Lake Natsukawa for centuries.
Pufnstuf	H.R. Pufnstuf	The mayor of Living Island and the titular character of the show, created by Sid and Marty Krofft.
Pyre	Mystic Knights of Tir Na Nog	An ancient dragon and rival of Tyrune the Hydra, associated with the Mystic Knight of Fire. Intolerant to human presence at first, he soon comes to admire Rohan, and later recognizes the Knight as Draganta, the legendary hero. Pyre wears a gemmed cuirass, through which he presumably makes contact with his rider's Dragon's Breath Dagger. His likeness is worked into the Mystic Knights armor.
Scorch	Scorch	Scorch, a 1,300-year-old puppet dragon created and controlled by Ronn Lucas, the main character of a television series that aired on CBS in the early 1990s.
Shou Ronpo	Uchu Sentai Kyuranger	The goofy yet wise leader of the Rebellion who can transform into Ryu Violet and later Ryu Commander, the tenth member of the titular team.
Sunfyre	House of the Dragon	Nicknamed Sunfyre the Golden, he was a gold dragon with pink wing membranes and rode by King Aegon II Targaryen.
Syrax	House of the Dragon	Syrax was a yellow dragoness rode by Queen Rhaenyra Targaryen.
Tad Cooper	Galavant	King Richard's pet dragon, believed to be merely a lizard but revealed to be an actual dragon in the finale.
Tamba	Tikkabilla	A small dragon puppet.
Vhagar	House of the Dragon	A huge bronze dragoness rode by Laena Velaryon and Aemond Targaryen.
Unnamed Dragons	Super Sentai and Power Rangers	Various depictions of both eastern dragons and European dragons are seen as mecha or zords from both series, some having their own warrior/megazord mode. Most prominent being Ryusei Oh/Red dragon Thunderzord from Gosei Sentai Dairanger or Mighty Morphin Power Rangers.

=== Dragons in animation ===
Name	Film	Notes
Arctic	Dinofroz: Dragon's Revenge	A white-bearded Asian dragon and one of Treek/Drakemon's generals, who uses his wings as blades and serves as calm and intelligent but aggressive strategist. He has a kindred friendship with Petraeus since both were recruited as generals at the same time and come to suspect what Drakemon is hiding from them. After he is accused of being a spy and a traitor to Drakemon, Arctic is put in the gladiator area to fight against the Fighter Dragons before being imprisoned, after which Natterjack takes his role as general.
Balthromaw	Rick And Morty	A dragon who gets Soul-bonded to Morty before inadvertently soul-bonding with Rick. Voiced by Liam Cunningham.
Barf and Belch	How to Train Your Dragon	Barf and Belch are the individually named heads of the same dragon, a hideous zippleback who belongs to the twins, Ruffnut and Tuffnut. One head breathes a flammable gas that spreads quickly, while the other creates a spark to light it, making them very destructive. Although both heads have independent brains, they mostly manage to work in coordination, particularly in assisting the twins in wreaking mischief.
Blue Dragon	Brave Animated Series	A general dragon who fell in love with Dragon Killer Brave and is Dragon Brave's mother.
Brimscythe	The Legend of Vox Machina	Brimscythe, the Iron Storm was a blue dragon whose human form was General Krieg, an identity he stole after killing the real Krieg to gain the manor in the Cloudtop District of Emon and the position of the Master of Law on the Tal'Dorei Council. Brimscythe was killed by Vox Machina in his lair.
Devon and Cornwall	Quest for Camelot	A conjoined two-headed dragon consisting of the sophisticated and intelligent Devon and the boorish but loyal Cornwall. Thanks to the bullying from the rest of the dragons due to their differences and their inability to fly, they want nothing more than to be apart from one another.
Discord	My Little Pony: Friendship is Magic	Recurring character first appearing as the main anti-hero of the two-part Season 2 premiere "The Return of Harmony". Described as the spirit of chaos and disharmony, he is an eccentric ancient draconequus, a serpentine, chimeral creature.
Dragon	Shrek	A nameless red fire-breathing female dragon and wife of Donkey. Has ruby-colored scales, leathery bat-like wings, long, crested ears, and a prehensile tail. Does not speak; uses body language and noises to communicate. She has a taste for knights, her favorite dish; has a recipe book for preparing them for dinner.
Dragon Brave	Brave Animated Series	An human-dragon hybrid who is forced to join Braves to protect her parents.
Drakemon	Dinofroz: Dragon's Revenge	A humanoid dragon with a mane made of fire. Originally known as Treek, he was a former general of Neceron's army and one of Neceron's generals alongside Gladius, Kobrax, and Vlad, supposedly being Vlad's best friend. After Neceron's death, he bathed in The Fires of Galgoth, sacred lava which makes him and the dragons more powerful, and becomes the new lord of the dragons, under the name Lord Drakemon.
Dulcy	Sonic the Hedgehog	Became a new character for season 2 of the animated series. Voiced by Cree Summer.
Elliott	Pete's Dragon	A green friendly dragon. Voiced by Charlie Callas.
Fang	Avatar: The Last Airbender	Avatar Roku's Spirit Guardian.
Goliath	Dragon and Slippers	Friendly dragon. Voiced by Dom DeLuise.
Gladius, the Gladiator Dragon	Dinofroz	Gladius is one of Neceron's generals, who possesses fire-based powers. He blindly obeys his lord; even after Neceron stole his powers, he refused to accept that his lord was wrong. Gladius is very strong, but struggles to fight the Dinofroz. He is very jealous of Vlad and, along with Kobrax, attempt to kill Vlad, but are stopped by two Vendetta Dragons. At the end of the series, he is seen to be buried under rocks after the Rockfroz explosion.
Haku	Spirited Away	A white dragon and Yubaba's apprentice, befriends the protagonist, Sen/Chihiro, and eventually aids in her escape from Yubaba's bath house. He is able to turn into a human at will, as well as cast spells of unbinding, invisibility, and binding. Haku is the spirit of the Kohaku river, which a young Chihiro fell into as a child, and has since been paved over to make room for a mall.
Hookfang	How to Train Your Dragon	Hookfang is a large, red dragon of the species known as the "monstrous nightmare". Capable of setting themselves on fire, they can only be fought off by experienced Vikings. While formidable looking, destructive, and less intelligent, he is loyal to his rider, Snotlout.
Kobrax, the Serpent Dragon	Dinofroz	Kobrax is one of Neceron's generals, who is intelligent, but he uses his cleverness for evil purposes. He is sly and jealous of Vlad, who he often argues with and attempts to kill in order to become the strongest of the generals. Kobrax can spit a paralyzing venom, a deadly venom, and fire, as well as constrict others with vines. At the end of the series, he is seen to be buried under rocks after the Rockfroz explosion.
Light Fury	How to Train Your Dragon	A white, sparkly dragon with blue eyes. She falls in love with Toothless after being freed from a cage. By the end of the movie, they have kids, later joining Hiccup and Astrid's family in the Homecoming holiday special.
Maleficent	Sleeping Beauty	A fairy with the ability to transform into a giant purple and black dragon. Ranked #1 in Ultimate Disney's 'Top 30 Disney Villains'. Also appears in the Kingdom Hearts video game series, where her dragon form appears as a boss in several games, including the first game and Kingdom Hearts: Birth by Sleep.
Meatlug	How to Train Your Dragon	Meatlug is a gronkle, a medium sized, round dragon with a small mouth and wings that cause them to fly similarly to a helicopter. While usually vicious, Meatlug is sweet-natured and affectionate, mostly to her rider, Fishlegs.
Mushu	Mulan	Fa Mulan's closest companion throughout the Mulan series and comic relief. He is a red Chinese dragon and is small, but implied that he is bigger in his "real size". He is voiced by Eddie Murphy in his first appearance and Mark Moseley afterward.
Nazboo	Shimmer and Shine	Zeta's pet blue dragon who talks in a strange way and voiced by Dee Bradley Baker.
Natterjack	Dinofroz: Dragon's Revenge	A dragon frog who can spit poisonous slim. He was the first dragon to win a fight against Tom and the Dinofroz in a rematch due to being part of the plan to fake a retreat. When General Arctic was blamed for being a traitor, Drakemon made Natterjack a general, taking Arctic's place.
Neceron	Dinofroz	Neceron is the strongest of all dragons and the master of the Dragon Land, and main antagonist of the series, who seeks to rid Earth of all humans and dinosaurs. With a glance, he can pierce rock and his flame can melt mountains.
Predaking	Transformers: Prime - Beast Hunters	An intelligent and powerful robotic dragon. Created by the Decepticons and brought to life by Shockwave.
Red Dragon	Brave Animated Series	A formidable dragon who is Dragon Girl's uncle.
Sisu	Raya and the Last Dragon	A water dragon who went into a 500-year slumber after compressing her magic into a gem that banished the Druun, which had ravished the people and dragons of Kumandra. She is awakened by Raya to reassemble the gem after it is broken.
Spike	My Little Pony	A baby dragon who first met the ponies in Firefly's Adventure and came to live with them. In the Friendship is Magic series, he is the assistant of Twilight Sparkle, who raised him from an egg, and has the task of delivering her messages to Princess Celestia.
Stormfly	How to Train Your Dragon	A large, bipedal, light blue dragon with large wings and an array of horns sprouting from its crown. Stormfly is Astrid's dragon, and her species is known as the "Deadly Nadder". She, along with the rest of her kind, has the ability to release poisonous spines from her tail. Combined with the momentum of tail-whipping motions, this makes them excellent marksmen, despite their frontal blind spot. She is playful and loves the game "fetch".
Summer	DreamWorks Dragons: Rescue Riders	A fastfin dragon who shoots water from her mouth and swims in bodies of water. Voiced by Skai Jackson.
Tabaluga	Tabaluga	Tabaluga lives in the fictional place of Greenland. He is around 7 dragon-years old (700 human years). Following his father's death when he was six, Tabaluga became the last of the dragons and the crown-prince of Greenland, defending his home from two rival kingdoms on either side of Greenland; a frigid arctic tundra, ruled by the evil snowman Arktos and a searing desert, ruled by the evil sand-spirit Humsin.
Terezi's Lusus	Homestuck	Unborn parent figure and psychic mentor to Terezi Pyrope.
Tiamat	Dungeons & Dragons	Venger's arch-rival, a fearsome dragon with a screeching, multi-level voice and five heads. Although Venger and the children both avoid Tiamat, the children make a deal with her in "The Dragon's Graveyard" to thwart Venger.
Toothless	How to Train Your Dragon	A black, sleek-headed dragon with retractable teeth and green eyes. Became a loyal companion to Hiccup after he helped Toothless regain his flight when giving him a prosthetic tail. His species is known as the "Night Fury" for its appearance and swift combat tactics. They have the ability to strike quickly and retreat to retaliate, but are also adept in direct combat.
Trogdor	Trogdor	Trogdor the Burninator is an original character created by Strong Bad in the sbemail dragon.
Various Dragons	The Dragon Prince	Dragons are a species of intelligent, magical beings inhabiting the lands of Xadia. Azymondias, nicknamed Zym, is a wind dragon and the title character. Zym's egg, initially believed to be destroyed, was discovered to be unharmed by Ezran, Callum, Bait and Rayla. The group then journeyed to return the egg to its mother, Zym having hatched along the way. Years after being reunited with his family, Zym regrouped with his friends to embark on a new quest to prevent the liberation of Aarovos. The quest only becomes complete after his parents' sacrifice, leaving him to become the next King of the Dragons.
Vlad, the Vampire Dragon	Dinofroz	Vlad is one of Neceron's generals and the most skilled, being the most appreciated general. He was once attacked by Gladius and Kobrax, who were jealous of him. They seriously wounded him, but he managed to stay alive. He was good friends with Treek, another dragon, until Treek betrayed him; despite this, Vlad freed Treek when Neceron had captured him. He can minimize himself, and by biting his foe's neck, he can transform other dragons into vampires. He reappears in the second season as Treek/Drakemon's general. After realizing that Drakemon is becoming insane, he eventually helps the Dinofroz save the world before Neceron steals his powers. His new appearance is more different than his wyvern-like body, he resembles more of a two-tailed European dragon with bat ears.
Whimsey Weatherbe	My Little Pony: Twinkle Wish Adventure	
Winger	DreamWorks Dragons: Rescue Riders	A Swiftwing dragon. Voiced by Zach Callison.

=== Dragons in video games ===
Dragons appear in numerous games with fictional setting as bosses, final bosses, and enemies, as well as player characters, companions, units, and supporting characters.

Name	Game	Notes
Alduin	The Elder Scrolls V: Skyrim	A fearsome, powerful, black dragon. Also known as "The World Eater", "Nordic God of Destruction", and "Bane of Kings". Claimed as first-born of Akatosh, the Dragon God of Time, and seeks world domination.
Alexstrasza, The Life Binder	Warcraft, Heroes of the Storm	Aspect of the Red Dragon Flight and guardian of all life in the world of Azeroth. She was one of five great dragons chosen by the titans to be empowered with a portion of the Pantheon's power and rule over her flight while they watched over Azeroth and its inhabitants, also being appointed queen of the dragons.
Archdemons	Dragon Age: Origins	Archdemons are evil creatures that possess intelligence far beyond the average dragon.
Aurene	Guild Wars 2	A crystal dragon, scion of Glint, player's character companion.
Bahamut	Final Fantasy series	Known by many titles, he is revered as the lord of the sky in Final Fantasy. His destructive MegaFlare can consume multiple cities in one attack.
Bash	Skylanders	A wingless dragon with tough, rock-like skin, Bash is sworn to defend the Skylands as a member of the Skylanders. He is of the Earth element and his catchphrase is "Rock and Roll!" Bop, an alternate-universe mini version of Bash, also appears on the team.
Bayle The Dread	Elden Ring	Large black and red drake who is the fiercest of all dragons and dragon-likes. Fought the Dragonlord Placidusax to a draw, subsequently retreating to the Jagged Peak. He is missing his left leg, and his wings are shredded and repurposed for fighting. He employs unique and devastating "fire lightning".
Blackout	Skylanders	A dragon with the ability to generate black holes, Blackout is sworn to defend the Skylands as a member of the Skylanders. He is of the Dark element and his catchphrase is "Darkness Falls!"
Blades	Skylanders	An armored dragon with razor-sharp wings, Blades is sworn to defend the Skylands as a member of the Skylanders. He is of the Air element and his catchphrase is "Looking Sharp!"
Blotworx Dragon	Epic Mickey 2: The Power of Two	Giant animatronic dragon piloted by a Blotling. He is the first boss of Epic Mickey 2: The Power of Two.
Camo	Skylanders	A dragon who is part plant and has the ability to cultivate explosive crops, Camo is sworn to defend the Skylands as a member of the Skylanders. He is of the Life element and his catchphrase is "Fruit Punch!"
Cynder	The Legend of Spyro & Skylanders	A purple who shoots lightning. In The Legend of Spyro series, she first appears as an antagonist to Spyro in A New Beginning before being defeated and freed by him, making subsequent appearances in The Eternal Night and Dawn of the Dragon. In Skylanders, Cynder is sworn to defend the Skylands as a member of the Skylanders. She is of the Undead element and her catchphrase is "Volts and Lightning!"
Charizard	Pokémon Red & Blue	Charizard (/ˈtʃɑːrɪzɑːrd/), known in Japan as Lizardon (リザードン, Rizādon) is a Pokémon in Nintendo and Game Freak's Pokémon franchise. Created by Atsuko Nishida, Charizard first appeared in the video games Pokémon Red and Blue (Pokémon Red and Green in Japan).
Darby	Darby the Dragon	A green dragon who bears the title Dragon Prince and goes on a quest to restore his shrunken sister Sparkle.
Deathwing, The Destroyer	World of Warcraft: Cataclysm, Heroes of the Storm	Known as 'the Destroyer' and originally as 'Neltharion the Earth-Warder'. Once a kind benevolent dragon, but was driven mad by the Old Gods and came to inspire fear and contempt.
Dimitrescu	Resident Evil Village	One of the four lords of the village, who was gifted with the Cadou parasite, which made her tall and require male human blood in order to stay alive. After Ethan Winters stabs her with the Dagger of Rose, a knife found in the church room, she begins to mutate into her true dragon-like form.
Dracolich	Dungeons & Dragons	An undead dragon called Dragotha, formerly consort to Tiamat, who was given his undead powers by the deity Kyuss.
Dragon Knight	Heroes of the Storm	Dragon Knight is a playable character transformation on the Dragon Shire battleground. Heroes can liberate the Dragon Knight by activating the shrines and interacting with the Knight's statue in the middle lane of the battleground, allowing them to temporarily take control of him.
Dragonlord Placidusax	Elden Ring	The King of all ancient dragons and the first true Elden Lord. He has two remaining heads out of 5, 2 large wings at the front, and 2 small wings at the back. He went dormant after his fight with Bayle and his god abandoning him. He has mastery of red lightning and breathes golden fire, and his scales are said to be able to lightly manipulate time itself.
Draigoch	Lord of the Rings Online	An evil red fire-breathing dragon found in the mountains of the Enedwaith. He is a boss of the Arch-Nemesis rank and a party of 12 - 24 is required to fight him.
Drobot	Skylanders	A dragon with high-tech, weaponized robotic armor, Drobot is sworn to defend the Skylands as a member of the Skylanders. He is of the Tech element and his catchphrase is "Blink and Destroy!" Drobit, an alternate-universe mini version of Drobot, also appears on the team.
Echo	Skylanders	A water dragon with the ability to generate powerful soundwaves by screaming, Echo is sworn to defend the Skylands as a member of the Skylanders. She is of the Water element and her catchphrase is "Let's Make Some Noise!"
Elvarg	Runescape	Elvarg is a female green dragon and is considerably stronger than most others of her kind. Elvarg lives on the island of Crandor and is found underground, in a cave that is connected to Karamja through a series of tunnels. During the quest Dragon Slayer, players must slay her and bring her head to Oziach in order to earn the right to wear the rune platebody, blue dragonhide body armor and mystic robe top.
Enywas	Darkmere	An evil destructive dragon who constantly slaughtered villagers until Prince Ebryn killed her for good.
Farosh	The Legend of Zelda: Breath of the Wild & The Legend of Zelda: Tears of the Kingdom	One of three roaming Dragons in Hyrule, alongside Naydra and Dinraal.
Fatalis	Monster Hunter	An ancient black dragon that destroyed the kingdom of Schrade in a single night. Highly aggressive and territorial and typically fought as a late-game monster. It has two variations, Crimson Fatalis and White Fatalis.
Feyrbrand	Legend of Dragoon	A dragon that appears at the beginning of the game, controlled by Emperor Doel. Known as "The Green-Tusked Dragon," it chases the protagonist until they are saved by Rose.
Fire Kraken	Skylanders	A firework-wielding Chinese dragon, Fire Kraken is sworn to defend the Skylands as a member of the Skylanders and the Swap Force. He is of the Fire element and his catchphrase is "Burn to be Wild!"
Flammie	Secret of Mana	A white dragon that is found and rescued by the main characters early in the game, and rapidly grows into a full-size dragon capable of carrying at least three people on its back. Later in the game, Flammie is revealed to be the legendary "Mana Beast", and battles the characters in the game's finale.
Flashwing	Skylanders	A crystalline dragon with the ability to shoot sharp crystal shards from her body, Flashwing is sworn to defend the Skylands as a member of the Skylanders. She is of the Earth element and her catchphrase is "Blinded by the Light!"
Grigori	Dragon's Dogma	Also known as "The Dragon", Grigori is an enormous red dragon who tears out the heart of the protagonist, marking them as an "Arisen" destined to destroy The Dragon to regain his/her heart. Grigori takes refuge in the Tainted Mountain, waiting for the current Arisen to challenge him. His role is to cultivate a strong will within the Arisen so that they may become the Seneschal, the overseer of the world. Grigori himself and all other dragons are former Arisen who have failed in their quest.
Grima	Fire Emblem Awakening	Also known as the "fell dragon," Grima is the manifestation of the corrupted earth dragon tribe seeking the genocide of all living creatures. He was sealed away in what is referred to as "The Dragon's Table" by the manakete queen, Naga, and revered by a cult of fanatics known as "The Grimleal", who seek to revive him. Protagonist Robin was born of his bloodline to serve as Grima's vessel; in the original future timeline, this plan succeeded and Robin killed Chrom. Present-day Robin suffers from amnesia and visions of their future self's memories as a result of Grima's failed attempt to give them his memories.
Jean? (Ender Dragon)	Minecraft	A giant black dragon with glowing purple eyes that lives in The End Dimension.
Kalameet	Dark Souls	One of the remaining ancient dragons, one fearsome enough to be feared by Anor Londo, the city of the gods. Found in the skies of ancient Oolacile.
Kasimir Æthelinde	Warhearts	A small red wyvern sworn to the Dominion as a Devout. In his juvenile state, he takes a humanoid form and is known for chili and other hot flavoured beverages that soothe his fiery soul
Kerafyrm, The Sleeper	EverQuest	The Great Prismatic Dragon. Originally intended to be an unkillable encounter that would rampage across the game world, players on the Rallos Zek server managed to defeat the Kerafyrm in November 2003 after their first attempt was cut short by the game's developers.
Malefor	The Legend of Spyro	Malefor, a.k.a. the Dark Master, is the arch-enemy of Spyro and Cynder. Completely malevolent, he is the unbalanced embodiment of evil, since having gained full command over the element Aether.
Malygos, The Spellweaver	Warcraft	He was the Aspect of the Blue Dragon Flight and one of the most ancient creatures living on Azeroth and the eldest of the Aspects. Norgannon, the titan master-magician and keeper of lore, granted Malygos a portion of his vast power, after which Malygos became known as the Spell-weaver, the guardian of arcane magic and hidden arcanum.
Midir; Darkeater	Dark Souls III	An ancient dragon tasked with defending and watching over the ringed city, which he did until the very end of time, where he fell to the abyss. Some say Midir's duty was out of protection of the ancient pygmies, some say it was to imprison them. Midir appears as a hidden boss in Dark Souls III''s second DLC, The Ringed City.
Minerva	Fire Emblem	Minerva is a name that appears more than once in Fire Emblem lore, most recently in Awakening, which is ridden by the recruitable character Cherche and her son.
Naga	Fire Emblem Awakening	Naga is the queen of the six dragon tribes, who ruled over the land 3,000 years before the events of Fire Emblem Awakening. She gave the First Exalt the Falchion and the Fire Emblem to defeat and seal away Grima, and continues to watch over humanity. In the original future timeline, her time spell allowed Lucina to travel back in time and prevent the events leading to that future.
Necrosan	Primal Rage	A deathly, zombie-like dragon with no skin to cover his muscular structure. He is the God of Death, and supposedly controls massive amounts of the undead as an army rather than the typical natives that willingly worshipped the other Gods. He also supposedly hatches from the "asteroid" which causes the Catyclisms.
Neuvillette	Genshin Impact	Neuvillette is the Iudex of Fontaine, and the leader of the Marechaussee Phantom. While Neuvillette upholds the rules of the court with utmost reverence, he is quite aloof when dealing with human emotions and often distances himself from the public eye. Despite his human appearance, he is actually the Hydro Dragon Sovereign. However, he did not obtain full dragonhood until the events of Archon Quest Chapter IV: Act V - Masquerade of the Guilty when the Hydro Archon Focalors returned his powers, which had been stolen by the Heavenly Principles from the Sovereigns, to him.
Nightshade	The Palace of Deceit	Nightshade is one of the rare dragons, who escapes the Palace dungeons and vows to kill the evil wizard Garth before he can wipe out dragonkind completely.
Nozdormu, The Timeless One	Warcraft	Aspect of the Bronze Dragon Flight and guardian of time, he is one of the former Dragon Aspects empowered by the titans to watch over Azeroth. He fought against the demons during the War of the Ancients, after which he retreated into seclusion, immersing himself in his duties and only emerging when events require his direct presence, such as intervening in the defeat of Deathwing at the hands of Krasus and his allies.
Paarthurnax	The Elder Scrolls V: Skyrim	A wise old dragon and Alduin's younger brother, who is met at the summit of the Throat of the World and helps the player defeat Alduin by teacing the shout, Dragonrend. It is optional in the game to kill Paarthurnax, but doing so is not recommended. He is also the master of the Greybeards and their "Way of the Voice".
Ridley	Metroid	Portrayed in different ways in separate Metroid titles, with varying size and sometimes capable of speech. Shown to be male and to have purple skin and glowing eyes, and resembling a Pterosaur in Super Metroid. Also has cyborg and robotic forms. Ridley has been described as the last of his species, native to Zebes. He is the leader of the Space Pirates, and the arch-enemy of Samus Aran, being responsible for murdering her parents.
Seath the Scaleless	Dark Souls	An albino dragon who helped Gwyn, Nito, and the Witch of Izalith destroy the everlasting dragons. Seath was born without the everlasting scales, making him mortal and an outcast. After the fall of the everlasting dragons, he founded sorcery, which sparked animosity between him and Havel the Rock. He resides in the Duke's Archives and the crystal caves where he researches and protects the Primordial Crystal.
Singe	Dragon's Lair	Captor of Princess Daphne and foe of heroic knight Dirk the Daring. Created by Rick Dyer and animator Don Bluth in 1983.
Spotlight	Skylanders	A white dragon with the ability to shoot powerful concentrated beams of light from her eyes, and throw golden halo rings to reflect those beams, Spotlight is sworn to defend the Skylands as a member of the Skylanders. She is of the Light element and her catchphrase is "Time to Shine!"
Spyro	Spyro the Dragon & Skylanders	Throughout the original series, Spyro is portrayed as energetic and curious, with little regard for his own safety. He is also described as a courageous hero, despite his small size. Spyro is also known for his cocky attitude and can be stubborn at times. In Skylanders, Spyro is sworn to defend the Skylands as a member of the Skylanders. He is of the Magic element and his catchphrase is "All Fired Up!" Spry, an alternate-universe mini version of Spyro, also appears on the team.
Sunburn	Skylanders	A phoenix-dragon hybrid with teleportation abilities, Sunburn is sworn to defend the Skylands as a member of the Skylanders. He is of the Fire element and his catchphrase is "Roast N' Toast!"
Synn	Dungeons & Dragons: Shadow over Mystara	A gigantic red wyrm dragon who takes the form of an Incantatrix and hungers to conquer the lands of Darokin. Portrayed as the final boss of the game.
Tathamet, The Prime Evil	Diablo	He was a seven-headed dragon of all darkness and vileness, known as the Prime Evil and created as a cast-off of the dark attributes within Anu long before Sanctuary came into existence. Separated from one being, Tathamet and Anu were trapped within the same place and fought for an indefinite length of time before destroying each other, causing the universe to come into being. After its death, Tathamet gave birth to the seven Great Evils, each being formed from one of Tathamet's heads, while its body became the foundation of the Burning Hells.
Tiamat	Dungeons & Dragons	A multi-headed dragon and arch enemy of Venger, whose heads can breathe fire, ice, poison and lightning.
Trag'Oul	Diablo	He is a mysterious dragon-like being worshipped by the Necromancers of the Cult of Rathma, who guards Sanctuary and maintains the Balance between the High Heavens and the Burning Hells. He has not been seen since the Sin War ended. In Richard A. Knaak's The Sin War trilogy, he is depicted as a constellation of stars, each showing the past, present, and future and possible choices. Trag'Oul's exact origins are unknown, although it is implied that other worlds have guardians similar to him.
Tweek the Dragon	Fur Fighters	Tweek is a dragon born in Royston Vasey, Wales to Gwynth the Fur Fighter. He is the youngest of the Fur Fighters at 0.002 years. His special skill is gliding.
Ur Dragon	Dragon's Dogma	A dragon with a gray/lavender palette. However, unlike The Dragon, the Ur-Dragon has thirty "hearts" located all over his body, which will glow as the Arisen or their Pawns approach the area. Each time a heart is destroyed, the area around it will rot and fall, revealing the Ur-Dragon's true form.
Vathek	Skylanders	Vathek is an Undead dragon who will stop at nothing to overthrow his brother and become ruler of Dragon's Peak. He is turned to stone at his defeat by the Skylanders.
Volvagia	The Legend of Zelda: Ocarina of Time	A corrupt dragon, who previously slept in the Fire Temple, whom Ganondorf awoke and unleashed. Killed by Link.
Whirlwind	Skylanders	A unicorn-dragon hybrid with the ability to generate rainbows and storm clouds, Whirlwind is sworn to defend the Skylands as a member of the Skylanders. She is of the Air element and her catchphrase is "Twists of Fury!" Breeze, an alternate-universe mini counterpart of Whirlwind, also appears on the team.
Ysera, The Dreamer	Warcraft	Aspect of the Green Dragon Flight, charged with keeping watch over the flowering wilds of Azeroth from within the Emerald Dream. Bound to this ethereal realm, she descended into an endless trance and became known as the Dreamer, later fighting the Emerald Nightmare and the corruption of her children.
Zap	Skylanders	An amphibious dragon equipped with a gold harness and the ability to spit electricity, Zap is sworn to defend the Skylands as a member of the Skylanders. He is of the Water element and his catchphrase is "Ride the Lightning!"

== Other appearances in popular culture ==
=== Dragons in online audiovisual media ===
- The Strong Bad Emails (flash cartoons) on the Homestar Runner website feature a dragon named Trogdor the Burninator.
- The Great Dragon of Bleecker Street is a character featured in Dimension 20's The Unsleeping City.

=== Dragons in radio ===
- Trorg, the Last Amber Dragon, and the blue sock-stealing dragons in Hordes of the Things

=== Dragons in songs ===
- Albi, from the Flight of the Conchords song "Albi the Racist Dragon"
- "Puff, the Magic Dragon" is best known from the hit single by Peter, Paul and Mary, originally a poem by Leonard Lipton and adapted by Peter Yarrow and since performed by countless other artists. The poem tells of an ageless dragon who befriends a young boy, only to be abandoned as the boy ages and forgets him. The song is often suspected to have references to marijuana, though the authors have publicly ridiculed this notion.
- Tharos, from the Emerald Sword Saga, a collection of five albums by the symphonic metal band Rhapsody
- The titular dragon in the song "The Dragon and Saint George" (2015) from Ten's release of the same name

=== Dragons in puppetry ===
- Dirty Dragon from The BJ and Dirty Dragon Show and Gigglesnort Hotel
- Read Alee Deed Alee, from the Slim Goodbody produced series teaching children reading and phonics
- Scorch the Teenaged Dragon, Ronn Lucas' ventriloquism puppet
- Delbert the Dragon, created by Jim Henson for La Choy commercials
- Kukla from the children's show Kukla, Fran and Ollie

=== Dragons in toys ===
- Scorch, Slayer, Loong, Dragon, Legend, Magic in Beanie Baby
- Megatron in Beast Wars becomes a bio-mechanical dragon after absorbing the essence of his ancestor.
- Predaking and the Predacons in Transformers: Prime have robotic dragons as alternate forms.
- Jinafire Long, the daughter of a Chinese dragon from Monster High

=== Dragons in theme parks and shows ===
- Tradinno, the world's largest walking robot
- Prezzemolo in Gardaland
- Figment in Journey into Imagination with Figment
- Danny in Happy Hollow Park & Zoo
- The Dragon in Legoland
- The 6 Dragons in Phantasialand
- Coaster in Rye Playland
- Piff the Magic Dragon, a British comedian and magician

=== Dragons in sport ===
- Blaze, a European dragon mascot that represents the University of Alabama at Birmingam (UAB) athletic teams.
- FC Porto, professional association football team from Portugal, nicknamed Os dragões and playing home matches at the Estádio do Dragão
- Wales national association football team, presenting the Welsh Dragon (y Ddraig Goch) on its crest
- San Francisco Dragons, field lacrosse team
- Somerset County Cricket Club, one of the first-class cricket clubs in England
- St. George Illawarra Dragons, Australian professional rugby league club
- Barcelona Dragons, professional american football team playing in the ELF
- Mario the Magnificent, Drexel Dragons mascot
- Stuff the Magic Dragon, Orlando Magic mascot

=== Dragons in podcasts ===
- Hiram McDaniels, a "literal five-headed dragon", and his sister Hadassah McDaniels from Welcome to Nightvale. Each head demonstrates differing personality traits and behaviors.
- Cerulean Depths Seen from a Great Height (A.K.A. Ceri). A gargantuan sea dragon with a long name and a snobby teen attitude, from Spout Lore.
- Mishka Beverly Paw Paw II, an energetic and rambunctious baby black dragon from Not Another D&D Podcast.

== See also ==
- List of dragons in mythology and folklore
- Chinese dragon, the Eastern interpretation of the dragon
- European dragon, the Western interpretation of the dragon
- Dragon Day, a celebration at Cornell University
- Princess and dragon, the archetypical/stereotypical premise about dragons kidnapping princesses
