= Lists of dragons =

This is a list of lists of dragons.

- List of dragons in mythology and folklore
- List of dragons in popular culture
- List of dragons in film and television
- List of dragons in games
- List of dragons in literature

== See also ==
- List of fictional species
