= XDragoon =

Comic series by Felipe Marcantonio

Cover of the first XDragoon volume

XDragoon is a series created by in 2008 by Brazilian artist Felipe Marcantonio. It is based on Japanese comics style, featuring the adventures of an alien race of dragons fighting enemies that threaten Earth. Since its debut the webcomic has earned a considerably large number of fans in its original country, in addition to having been published in printed special editions, and manga magazines.

The series was designed primarily to serve as an animated series, but the author decided to cancel the project and proceed with a webcomic. It has a weekly publication through pages relying on language versions in Portuguese and English.

== History ==
Rocky and Alfred are two humanoid dragons, coming from the planet Gan-Mah infiltrated the ship its emperor Krad Del Black, seeking a magic stone known as XGem found on Earth, along with his army. Upon arrival on the planet the two engage in a battle against a soldier and fall in a city where saving a human girl, Renata who happens to host them at home since then. With time during the series new characters are appearing, some teaming up to Rocky, while others opposed him and his friends.

== Comics ==
In total, 35 chapters, 3 supplementary installments and a special story were produced, and over 2000 pages were drawn. The webcomic ran from August 1, 2008 to November 12, 2016. The series consists of various Arcs:

- Emperor Krad Attacks - From Chapters 1 to 11, the first arc of the series presents the beginnings of the main story, when Rocky and Alfred meet Renata. They meet other people who help him on find the XGem before the Emperor.
- Fire King - This is a special arc made specially for the anime and mangá Magazine, Revista Neo Tokyo published by Editora Escala. 16 Chapters of 6 pages were produced, but just 12 were published because Editora Escala closed and the magazine ended. The end is still unpublished physically nor digitally. The full story consists of 100 pages, telling of an adventure on an island called Hawhai (a thinly-disguised version of Hawaii) and the mysterious Fire King.
- Mansion of Fighting - From Chapters 13 to 15, the mini arc features, Rocky, Alfred and Lance help a woman called Thais to find her lost husband, the wrestler Jambo.
- The Morphs Game - From Chapters 16 to 27, biggest adventure against the Morphs, the creatures from Deoh-tah planet! They need to reach the top of their base, Casulo, to stop the Earth from being destroyed.
- Alp-Pha Crises - From Chapters 28 to 33, the last arc, this time back on Planet Gan-Mah, sees the dragons going up against a mysterious alien race called Jewelians.

== Spin-Off ==
- XDragoon Rockstar - Released from July 13, 2013 to September 10, 2016, XDragoon Rockstar is a spin-off series featuring some different versions of characters and a completely different story. It was the original concept of XDragoon series, that got scrapped early in production, featuring more adult humor and themes. The revival of this concept was to celebrate the 5th anniversary of the webcomic series and it was meant to consist only of one chapter, but in the end become a mini-series with 7 Chapters. It tell the story of Cynthia, a girl who wants to become a Rockstar and lives with 2 dragons: Rocky and Albert.

== Characters ==
Main Characters

- Rocky - A blue dragon and adventurer who was abandoned by his father when he was a child. Is always with his best friend Alfred and has a platonic love for Renata. He is also the only one able to use XGem.
- Renata Oliveira - A young college student who lived alone until she met Rocky and Alfred and participate in their adventures. As the story advances, she considers Rocky a real friend.
- Alfred - The best friend Rocky. A purple dragon, fat and short man who likes battles and cause their enemies, besides being somewhat roguish.

Elite Soldiers A group of dragon warriors who serves the emperor of Planet Gan-Mah

- Philip - A red dragon and thick lips, a former member of the elite warriors of Krad. He is an apprentice Fei, along with Berry and Lance. He is also the most nervous member of the group.
- Berry - A female dragon partner Philip, and former member of the elite warriors of Krad. She is the smartest of the team and has a rivalry with Viper.
- Lance - The youngest Elite Soldier, rather immature and always wanting to enter on missions.
- Fei - The leader of them, being the oldest of the dragons who come to Earth. He does not fight as much, but is really powerful.

Other Dragons

- Krad Del Black - He was the emperor of the planet Gan Mah-and one of the antagonists of the first saga. He had lost his wife Topaz and XGem wanted to be able to resurrect her.
- Dr. John Scar - The assistant Krad and one of the villains of the first saga.

Humans

- Marina Carneiro - A classmate of Renata and her best friend. She is a rich girl who loves parties, but hates studies and Guilherme's girlfriend. She befriends dragons, occasionally following the adventures.
- Guilherme Alves - Marina's boyfriend and friend Renata. He also befriends the dragons with time occasionally following the adventures.
- Cristina Almeida - She is the teacher Renata and Marina. An eccentric woman and in love with dragons. Whenever she sees a dragon she gives a surge of joy and often grabs. As Marina and Guilherme, she also befriends dragons.

== Original Animations ==
Originally, the webcomic author planned to make the series as an animation. Its first episode was completed in 2008 with as voice actors Igor Lott (voice actor of Madara in Naruto Shippuden) and Tânia Gaidarji (voice actress of Bulma in Dragon Ball Z). But the author decided to cancel the animation project to focus on the webcomics to release the series faster. In 2010 celebrating two years of release was made a new animation. Animadness sung by the band aiming a prototype opening of a cartoon series. Both animations became available in the YouTube.

== XDragoon: Fire King ==
It is the second animated project of XDragoon announced in November 14, just 2 days after the end of webcomics. It consists of a webseries of the special arc, Fire King that was originally published on Neo Tokyo Magazine by Editora Escala in Brazil. The series is still in production in a slow rhythm because of other Felipe's works as the Fred Guará webcomics and the work on Turma da Mônica Jovem and Chico Bento Moço, since 2017.

The animation have 2 episodes released at the moment on YouTube, the estimative is to have around 10 episodes. Each episode is planned to have around 3 to 5 minutes, variating from episode to episode. The cast of animation features the voices of:

- Rocky - William Viana Schuler
- Alfred - Eduardo Villas
- Renata - Carol Valença
- Marina - Aino Alex
- Guilherme - Miguel de Britto
- Phillip - Francisco Júnior
- Berry - Flora Paulita
- Lance - Pedro Alcântara
- Fei - Carlos Campanile
- Thief - Ettore Zuim
- Viper - Raquel Marinho
- Nygel - Marcelo Campos
- Lard - Mauro de Castro
- Ebony - Marli Bortoletto
- Fire King - Mauro Ramos
- Narrator - Luis Feier Motta
- Additional Voices - Leticia Celini, Jonatas Carmona, Lucas Almeida and Felipe Marcantonio himself
