= Scorch (TV series) =

- Genre: Sitcom
- Created by: Allan Katz
- Developed by: Zane Buzby; Bob Calderon; Edgar Scherick
- Written by: Allan Katz; Daniel Margosis; Joe Toplyn
- Directed by: Richard Correll; Zane Buzby; John Sgueglia
- Starring: Jonathan Walker; Rhea Silver-Smith; Lauren Katz; Rose Marie; John O'Hurley; Brenda Strong; Todd Susman
- Voices of: Ronn Lucas
- Composer: Ray Colcord
- Country of origin: United States
- Original language: English
- No. of seasons: 1
- No. of episodes: 6 (3 unaired)

Production
- Executive producer: David Tyron King
- Producer: Wenda Fong
- Cinematography: Walter Glover
- Running time: 30 minutes
- Production companies: Allan Katz Productions; Saban/Scherick Productions; Honeyland Productions; Lorimar Television

Original release
- Network: CBS
- Release: February 28 – March 13, 1992

Scorch is an American television sitcom that aired on CBS in 1992, and was canceled after three episodes were broadcast.

The title character, a miniature dragon, is a puppet that was used by ventriloquist Ronn Lucas before the series came to be; although Lucas never actually appeared in the series, he did supply Scorch's voice.

== Cast ==
- Jonathan Walker as Brian Stevens
- John O'Hurley as Howard Gurman
- Brenda Strong as Allison King
- Rhea Silver-Smith as Jessica Stevens
- Todd Susman as Jack Fletcher

== Premise ==
Scorch, a small 1,300-year-old dragon, awakens from a 100-year sleep in 1992. While flying around, he's struck by lightning and he crash-lands in front of the apartment of Brian Stevens (Jonathan Walker) and his daughter Jessica (Rhea Silver-Smith). The next day, as a result of awkward circumstances, Brian lands a job as a TV weatherman at New Haven, Connecticut television station WWEN-TV by pretending that he's a ventriloquist and Scorch is his puppet; no one except Brian and Jessica knows that Scorch is a real dragon.

== Episodes ==
| No. | Title | Directed by | Written by | Original release date |
|---|---|---|---|---|
| 1 | "Pilot" | Zane Buzby | Allan Katz | February 28, 1992 |
After crashing in front of Brian's apartment, Scorch soon endears himself to Brian's 8-year-old daughter, but not to Brian. However, he persuades Brian to take him along to a job interview, concealed in a bag. Scorch pops out of the bag during the interview, and Brian must think quickly...
| 2 | "Dragon Flu" | Zane Buzby | Allan Katz | March 6, 1992 |
Scorch is suffering from dragon flu; the symptoms include amnesia, unconsciousness, coughing, swearing, and barking. Unfortunately, Brian and Scorch have to present a "Man of the Year" award to the station's boss.
| 3 | "You Gaslight Up My Life" | John Sgueglia | Bill Richmond | March 13, 1992 |
Scorch becomes effusive and annoys everyone after a photo of him appears on the cover of the new TV magazine.
| 4 | "First Time" | Zane Buzby | Lee Aronsohn | Unaired |
Scorch tries to help Brian find a girlfriend, but Scorch's obtrusive ways prove to be embarrassing.
| 5 | "Scorch Likes It Hot" | Howard Storm | Joe Toplyn | Unaired |
Dr. Joyce Brothers gives suggestions to the head of the station, such as replacing Brian's "puppet" with a female one.
| 6 | "Money, Money, Money" | Jim Drake | Allan Katz | Unaired |
Scorch discovers the Home Shopping Channel, and maxes out Brian's credit card. Scorch then tries to make some of Brian's money back by inviting everyone from the station to a poker game.
