= Dragon Fighter =

- Written by: Phillip J. Roth, Micheal Baldwin
- Directed by: Phillip J. Roth
- Starring: Dean Cain; Kristine Byers; Robert Zachar
- Countries of origin: United States; Bulgaria
- Original language: English

Production
- Producers: Jeffery Beach, Dean Cain
- Running time: 85 minutes

Original release
- Network: Sci Fi Channel
- Release: January 4, 2003

Dragon Fighter is a Sci Fi Pictures original film that premiered on January 4, 2003 and was directed by Phillip J. Roth. It stars Dean Cain and Kristine Byers.

== Plot ==
In England in the Middle Ages, a dragon decimates a town, and six knights vow to kill the creature in its lair. In the ensuing fight, the dragon shoots a fireball at the knights' barrels of gunpowder. This causes an explosion and a cave-in which traps the dragon and five of the six knights.

One thousand years later, in the nearby desert of California, Captain David Carver transports Dr. Ian Drakovitch to an ultra-secret underground research facility where scientists specialize in cloning endangered or extinct animals. There, David becomes the new security officer. Russian security officer Captain Sergei Petrov introduces him to Dr. Meredith Winter, Dr. Greg Travis, Kevin Korisch, and Bailey Kent. He also meets Cookie, the facility's cook. Ian eventually reveals that he uncovered the remains of a "winged creature". Ian orders the fossil samples to be put inside a cloning chamber and says that the whole animal should reform within 24 hours.

To everyone's surprise, the cloning process is completed within three hours. Ian sends two scientists into the cloning chamber to retrieve the specimen, but an explosion blows the room apart. The cloned creature, the dragon, blew a hole in the back of the room leading into an underground basement. David and Greg head into the cellar, and find the consumed bodies of the two scientists.

Greg is eventually killed by the dragon. David fires at it, but the bullets barely affect its skin. Later, both David and Sergei head into the hallways to reach the elevator so they can all escape. However, the back hallway explodes, killing Sergei.

Having blasted the entire system, the dragon causes an automatic lockdown which traps it with the humans. The creature is warm-blooded (much like the dinosaurs) and needs to keep itself cool, so the scientists have to revert the cooling system to lure the dragon away from the elevator. To do this, they need a laptop in Kevin's room, so David orders Kevin to accompany him because he is the only one who can open it. They make it into his room, but Kevin insists that he wants to stay. David leaves him, grabs the laptop and heads out. The dragon eventually eats Kevin.

David returns to the lab with the battered laptop. They download the information needed access the elevator into the main computer. Ian goes mad and starts shooting the mainframe, screwing it up even more. The damaged mainframe activates a self-destruct system, which will cause the entire facility to explode in minutes. Evading the dragon, David returns to the vent, reaches a storage box and reboots the elevator's system manually. He then returns to the lab and gets the remaining people to run for the elevator before the base explodes.

They head into the elevator, the wires of which the dragon fries, preventing it from moving. Most of the survivors climb out of the elevator, into which the dragon breathes fire, killing both Bailey and Cookie. Ian, David, Dr. Winter and her pet cloned dog head outside and start up the helicopter before the facility explodes. However, the dragon escapes by squeezing through the elevator vent, and flies after the helicopter. David calls for backup at a nearby military base. Ian opens a side door to take pictures of the dragon, which knocks him out of the helicopter, causing him to fall to his death.

Jets eventually appear, but cannot lock on the dragon, which is too cold for their heat-seeking missiles. The dragon gets mad, blows two jetplanes apart and keeps following the helicopter, which is about to malfunction. David has an idea and tells Dr. Winter to take control of the helicopter. He then opens up the fuel hatch, dumps half the fuel on the dragon, and fires a flare gun at it, causing it to burst into flames. With a target hot enough to fire upon, the jets kill the dragon with a missile.

At the destroyed facility, two soldiers head in to retrieve anything from the explosion. They discover a second lab under the first one and a cloning chamber housing a dragon embryo that grows in size, breaks out of the chamber, and kills them.

== Cast ==
=== Bio Dragon ===
While there is no official name some fans refer to the monster as Bio Dragon; another name occasionally used to refer the creature is the "Genetic Dragon". The monster is roughly 30 feet (about half that is its counterbalancing tail) long, 6 feet tall when moving at speed, and nearly double that when fully erect as if to breathe fire or otherwise. It moves in a traditional theropod stance with its long, dexterous arms folded and held near, but not to, its chest; the wings stay tight to its back when not in use. The dragon has the typical horns and spines of dragonkind, but are not too elaborate in design or size. The dragon is a stony grey-black color. It is carnivorous and warm-blooded. Its endothermic nature combined with breathing out fire is its only serious fault because it needs to stay in cooler areas to keep from suffering from heat stroke or exhaustion, so it keeps near the air conditioning vents in the facility. This would explain why the reptile was living in England in the Middle Ages, a relatively cold place. The dragon can also breathe a napalm-like stream of fire, fly/glide and condense the flames into explosive fireballs with the added addition of having tightly interlocked armored scales that is sturdy enough to withstand many bullet shots, even a shotgun cannot breach the scaly skin of the flying reptile. It can, however, be destroyed by ordinary missiles from fighter jets.

=== Cast ===
- Dean Cain as Capt. David Carver
- Kristine Byers as Dr. Meredith Winter
- Robert Zachar as Dr. Ian Drackovitch
- Marcus Aurelius as Dr. Greg Travis
- Robert DiTillio as Kevin Korisch
- Vassela Dimitrova as Bailey Kent
- Hristo Shopov as Capt. Sergei Petrov
- Chuck Eckert as 'Cookie'
