= Ronn Lucas =

American ventriloquist (born 1954)

- Born: United States

Comedy career
- Medium: Stand-up comedy, ventriloquism
- Website: ronnlucas.com

Ronn Lucas (born 1954) is an American ventriloquist and stand-up comedian.

== Career ==
Lucas grew up in El Paso, Texas and graduated from Eastwood High School in 1972. By the time he was 10, Lucas could speak without moving his mouth.

He began his career performing at Saint Timothy's Lutheran church located in El Paso, Texas. At 21, he began touring the country. “I was hired by the Billy the Kid Clothing Company, which was big in El Paso at the time; they hired me to tour the country with a Billy the Kid puppet”, Lucas said. Though that contract was only for a year, it reinforced Lucas’ dream of being in show business, an arena where he has excelled. In September 2004, he received a standing ovation on the Muscular Dystrophy Association Telethon and host Jerry Lewis said, “It doesn’t get any better than that.” In 2005, the Smothers Brothers presented Lucas with the Askins Achievement Award at the ninth annual Vegas Ventriloquist Festival.

He has received many accolades for his work, including several titles as the best entertainer in Las Vegas. He has performed in numerous live shows and television performances. He first made the national scene by winning the Showtime cable network's national "Laff-Off" competition

Lucas has headlined six separate stints in Las Vegas, Nevada at five different hotels, most recently at Planet Hollywood Resort and Casino, where his show was signed to a five-year deal in December 2006, but closed midway through 2007 for unknown reasons. His headlining stint prior to that was at the Rio Hotel. His show there ran from some time prior to 2003 until Fall 2006. He was the first ventriloquist in the history of Las Vegas to have a long-running show.

Lucas has been a performer on CBS specials at the Kennedy Center for President Ronald Reagan, at Ford's Theatre for President Bill Clinton, and again at Ford's Theatre for President George W. Bush. He also performed at the London Palladium for Queen Elizabeth.

Some of his most frequently used puppets include Buffalo Billy, Chuck Roast, and Scorch, the latter who starred in his own extremely short lived sitcom Scorch. He also has a routine in which he uses an audience member as a dummy.

=== Television ===
Lucas had his own U.K. television series for Thames Television entitled The Ronn Lucas Show (1990–1995) which lasted for five years. He was also a semi-regular on the 1990 revival of Match Game and the 1988 revival of The Smothers Brothers Comedy Hour.

Lucas has also been a regular on sitcoms and variety shows, including Super Dave, Night Court, Silk Stalkings, L.A. Law, Nip/Tuck, along with appearances on The Late Show with David Letterman, The Tonight Show with Johnny Carson, The Tonight Show with Jay Leno, America's Funniest Home Videos, Xuxa, and Circus of the Stars.

Lucas released a DVD of the Disney Channel special Who's In Charge Here?

== Works ==
Lucas co-authored the book "Better Living Through Ventriloquism": How to Say What You Shouldn't And Get What You Want.
