= Dragonheart (franchise) =

Film franchise about dragons that share their hearts with humans

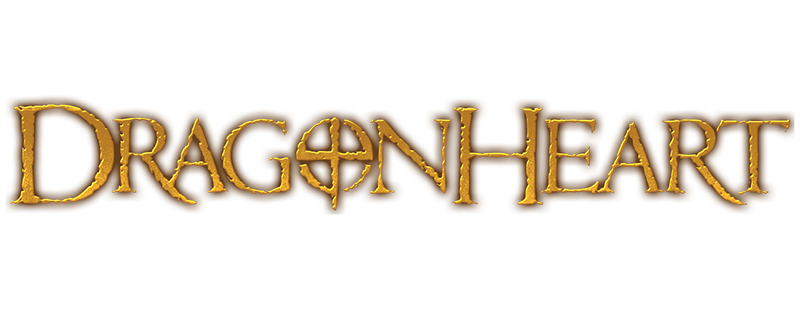
- Created by: Universal Pictures; Patrick Read Johnson; Charles Edward Pogue
- Original work: Dragonheart (1996)
- Owner: Universal Pictures
- Years: 1996-present

Print publications
- Novels: Dragonheart (1996); Dragonheart: Junior Novelization (1999)
- Comics: Dragonheart #1-2 (1996) (Topps Comics)

Films and television
- Film: Dragonheart (1996)
- Direct-to-video: Dragonheart: A New Beginning (2000); Dragonheart 3: The Sorcerer's Curse (2015); Dragonheart: Battle for the Heartfire (2017); Dragonheart: Vengeance (2020)

Games
- Video game(s): Dragonheart: Fire & Steel (1996); Dragonheart Medieval Creativity Center (1996)

Audio
- Soundtracks: Dragonheart (1996); Dragonheart: A New Beginning (2000); Dragonheart 3: The Sorcerer's Curse (2015); Dragonheart: Battle for the Heartfire (2017); Dragonheart: Vengeance (2020)
- Original music: "My Heart Goes With You" (2000)

Miscellaneous
- Toys: Kenner Products; Revell

Dragonheart, stylized as DragonHeart, is a Universal Pictures media franchise that began with the 1996 film of the same name, directed by Rob Cohen and written by Charles Edward Pogue, based on an original story by Pogue and Patrick Read Johnson. The film's moderate box office success and strong home media sales spawned the franchise, consisting of a straight-to-video sequel, three prequels, and various merchandise, including toys, trading cards, and books.

== Films ==
=== Dragonheart (1996) ===
During the Dark Ages, the young Anglo-Saxon prince Einon (Lee Oakes) gets wounded during a peasant rebellion that kills his tyrannical father, King Freyne. His mother, Queen Aislinn (Julie Christie), brings Einon to a dragon (Sean Connery) that shares half its heart with the boy-king on the condition that Einon rule with honor. When Einon betrays his word, his mentor Sir Bowen (Dennis Quaid), a knight of the Old Code, believes the dragon's heart corrupted Einon and swears vengeance. Twelve years later, Einon (David Thewlis) is a more brutal king than his father, and Bowen is an embittered dragonslayer. During one of his escapades, he meets the traveling monk Brother Gilbert (Pete Postlethwaite) and soon encounters the world's last dragon. Their battle ends in a stalemate, and they decide to team up for mutual benefit by conning villagers for money with staged dragon slayings. They become friends, and Bowen names the dragon Draco after the constellation. They meet a peasant woman named Kara (Dina Meyer), trying to start an uprising against Einon. Joining her cause, Bowen and his allies learn that they must make a great sacrifice to free the land from Einon's tyranny.

=== Dragonheart: A New Beginning (2000) ===
Decades after the 1996 film, the elderly Bowen finds a dragon egg in Draco's cave a year before his death. There is a prophecy foretelling that a dragon's heart will doom humanity when a two-tailed comet arrives, so Bowen leaves the egg in the care of Brother Gilbert's monastery. The friars vow to hide the dragon until after the comet passes. Twenty years later, eight days before the fateful day, the king (Ken Shorter) names Lord Osric (Harry Van Gorkum) his chief advisor, and the task of caring for the dragon falls upon the novice monk Mansel (Matt Hickey). Meanwhile, two Hebei Province citizens, Master Kwan (Henry O) and Empress Lian (Rona Figueroa), seek the dragon to prevent the prophecy. Geoff (Chris Masterson), an orphaned stable boy in the monastery, befriends the young dragon hidden in the dungeon named Drake (Robby Benson). After the kingdom becomes aware of Drake's existence, he and Geoff fail to see the dangers hidden around them as Osric, anticipating the comet's arrival, uses Geoff's desire to be a knight to get close to Drake.

A New Beginning is the sequel to Dragonheart, the first direct-to-video film in the series, the film with the shortest runtime and the only one rated PG. It is the only film in the franchise with a female screenwriter and an original song.

=== Dragonheart 3: The Sorcerer's Curse (2015) ===
A druid circle foresees a falling star from the Draco constellation in 9th century Northern Britain. A druid named Brude (Jonjo O'Neill) seeks to wage war against the inhabitants on the Southern side of Hadrian's Wall. On the wall's southern flank, Sir Horsa (Dominic Mafham) denies a squire named Gareth (Julian Morris) his knighthood until he pays 100 crowns. After a meteor crashes north of the wall, Gareth sets to find it as rumor says it contains gold. Gareth is shocked to find a set of dragon eggs guarded by a dragon (Ben Kingsley) instead. After the dragon saves Gareth's life, the two become bonded. Then Gareth and the dragon, whom Gareth names Drago, must work with an apprentice druid named Lorne (Jassa Ahluwalia) and a Celtic rebel leader named Rhonu (Tamzin Merchant) to retrieve the eggs, defeat Brude, and stop his reign of terror. Along the way, they must work to free Drago from a curse that Brude cast on him, and Gareth learns what it truly means to be a knight of the Old Code.

Dragonheart 3 is the first prequel to the 1996 film and chronologically the first in the series.

=== Dragonheart: Battle for the Heartfire (2017) ===
Roughly 50 years after Dragonheart 3, King Gareth dies without an heir since his son, Prince Walter, ran away from home years ago after becoming disillusioned with dragons after the untimely passing of his mother, Queen Rhonu. Drago (Patrick Stewart) does not join Gareth in death, finding himself still bonded to someone. He finds Edric (Tom Rhys Harries), a young man with enhanced strength and scales on his back. Learning that Edric is Walter's son, Drago brings him to Lundenwic, Britannia, to assume the throne. Drago soon learns his bond with Edric is incomplete, and Edric tells Drago about his estranged twin sister Mehgan (Jessamine-Bliss Bell), who bore scales on her face and could control fire. Vikings from Daneland invade Lundenwic, and Edric and Mehgan reunite. Mehgan claims the throne should be hers since she's the elder twin, but Edric refuses to step down. Drago's power source - the Heartfire - gets stolen, and Edric reluctantly gives Mehgan the throne. Once the Viking leader Thorgrim (André Eriksen) takes the Heartfire for himself and challenges the siblings' rights to the throne, Drago must use tough love to make them face family secrets and resolve their rivalry to recover the Heartfire as more than their kingdom is at stake.

=== Dragonheart: Vengeance (2020) ===
A young farm boy in Wallachia named Lukas (Jack Kane) sees his parents murdered and his home burned down by four marauders: The Bear (Ross O'Hennessy), The Wolf (Richard Ashton), The Snake (Carolina Carlsson), and The Scorpion (Tam Williams). Seeking to avenge his family, Lukas enlists the aid of a mercenary named Darius (Joseph Millson) and the ice-breathing dragon Siveth (Helena Bonham Carter), who was exiled 20 or 30 years prior for refusing to save King Razvan's (Arturo Muselli) life. Though reluctant, Lukas's mission compels Siveth to come out of hiding. As they hunt the raiders, Siveth urges Lukas not to let revenge consume him, and the trio uncovers revelations and a decades-long political conspiracy connected to them.

Including flashbacks, this film's events begin between Dragonheart 3 and 4 and end after the latter.

== Themes ==
The most prominent themes that the Dragonheart series explores are sacrifice, honor, courage, and conquering evil. The films also explore knighthood and chivalry through the Old Code.

The films show some humans and dragons with good intentions, but they backfire and cause suffering, forcing them to own up to their choices and confront thoughts and beliefs they have long avoided. The dragons often act as the humans' guiding light and moral compass, even if they do not start on ideal terms. The humans they meet are in a tough place in their lives and have lost their way, close to giving up on life, falling prey to their dark impulses after suffering tragedy or becoming disillusioned by others' corruption or lack of idealism. Spending time with the dragon and befriending it inspires the humans to reaffirm their faith in people, make the right choices, and choose the right path, though it sometimes requires both species to make personal sacrifices to rectify their mistakes and restore peace.

== Cast and crew ==
=== Cast ===
List indicators

This section includes characters who will appear or have appeared in more than two films in the series.

- An empty grey cell indicates the character was not in the film, or that the character's official presence has not yet been confirmed.
- ^{A} indicates an appearance through archival footage or audio.
- ^{C} indicates a cameo role.
- ^{O} indicates an older version of the character.
- ^{S} indicates an appearance through use of special effects.
- ^{U} indicates an uncredited appearance.
- ^{V} indicates a voice-only role.
- ^{Y} indicates a younger version of the character.

Character	Films				
Character	Dragonheart	Dragonheart: A New Beginning	Dragonheart 3: The Sorcerer's Curse	Dragonheart: Battle for the Heartfire	Dragonheart: Vengeance
Main characters
Dragons
Draco	Sean Connery^{S}^{V}	Archive footage^{C}		Background portrait	
Drake		Robby Benson^{S}^{V}			
Griffin		Harry Van Gorkum^{S}^{V}			
Drago			Ben Kingsley^{S}^{V}	Patrick Stewart^{O}^{S}^{V}	Mentioned
Siveth				Background portrait	Helena Bonham Carter^{S}^{V}
Humans
Bowen	Dennis Quaid	Dennis Quaid^{A}^{C} Harry Van Gorkum^{O}			
Einon	David Thewlis Lee Oakes^{Y}				
Brother Gilbert	Pete Postlethwaite				
Kara	Dina Meyer Sandra Kovacicova^{Y}				
Queen Aislinn	Julie Christie				
Geoff		Chris Masterson			
Lord Osric of Crosley		Harry Van Gorkum			
Lian		Rona Figueroa			
Mansel		Matt Hickey			
Master Kwan		Henry O			
Gareth			Julian Morris	Valeriu Bazu^{O}	Mentioned
Rhonu			Tamzin Merchant	Flashback cameo	
Lorne			Jassa Ahluwalia		
Sir Horsa			Dominic Mafham		
Brude			Jonjo O'Neill		
Edric				Tom Rhys Harries Rafe Williams^{Y}	
Mehgan				Jessamine-Bell Bliss Willa Williams^{Y}	
Thorgrim				André Eriksen	
Osmund				Martin Hutson	
Walter				Turlough Convery Oliver Buck^{Y}	
Darius					Joseph Millson Tomas Otto Ghela^{Y}
Lukas					Jack Kane
Supporting and minor characters
Brok	Brian Thompson				
King Freyne	Peter Hric				
Redbeard	Terry O'Neill				
Hewe	Wolf Christian				
Felton	Jason Isaacs				
Roland		Tom Burke			
The King		Ken Shorter			
Friar Peter		John Woodnutt			
The Potter			Roger Ashton-Griffiths^{U}		
Traevor			Jake Curran		
Elisedd			Duncan Preston		
Begilda			Ozama Oancea		
Sir Wulfric			Serban Celea		
Cuthbert			Daniel Everett-Lock		
Kalin			Harry Lister-Smith		
Earl Robert Cole				Richard Cordery	
Councilor Marrakar				Delroy Brown	
Player				Lewis Mackinnon	
Sable				Marte Germaine Christensen	
Krokr				Ørjan Gamst	
Hakon				Daniel Berge Halvorsen	
Leiknarr				Stig Frode Henriksen	
Spaki				Elijah Ungvary	
Kendra				Dina De Laurentiis	
King Razvan					Arturo Muselli
The Snake					Carolina Carlsson
The Scorpion					Tam Williams
The Wolf					Richard Ashton
The Bear					Ross O'Hennessy
Blacksmith					Cameron Jack
Oana					Fabienne Piolini-Castle

=== Crew ===
Role	Films				
Role	Dragonheart	Dragonheart: A New Beginning	Dragonheart 3: The Sorcerer's Curse	Dragonheart: Battle for the Heartfire	Dragonheart: Vengeance
Role	May 31, 1996	August 8, 2000	February 10, 2015	June 13, 2017	February 4, 2020
Role	104 minutes	84 minutes	97 minutes	98 minutes	97 minutes
Director	Rob Cohen	Doug Lefler	Colin Teague	Patrik Syversen	Ivan Silvestrini
Producer(s)	Raffaella De Laurentiis	Raffaella De Laurentiis	Raffaella De Laurentiis	Raffaella De Laurentiis	Raffaella De Laurentiis
Producer(s)	Hester Hargett (co-producer); David Rotman (exec.); Patrick Read Johnson (exec.)	Hester Hargett (co-producer)	Lisa Gooding (exec.); Gary Oldroyd (assoc.); Matthew Feitshans (assoc.)	Matthew Feitshans (assoc.)	Matthew Feitshans (assoc.); Victor Trichkov (assoc.)
Writer(s)	Charles Edward Pogue	Shari Goodhartz	Matthew Feitshans	Matthew Feitshans	Matthew Feitshans
Writer(s)	Story by Patrick Read Johnson & Charles Edward Pogue	Based on characters created by Patrick Read Johnson & Charles Edward Pogue			
Composer(s)	Randy Edelman	Mark McKenzie; Randy Edelman (themes)	Mark McKenzie; Randy Edelman (themes)	Mark McKenzie; Randy Edelman (themes)	Mark McKenzie; Randy Edelman (themes)
Cinematographer(s)	David Eggby	Buzz Feitshans IV	David Luther	Andreas Johannessen	Matthew Weston
Editor(s)	Peter Amundson	John M. Taylor	Fiona Colbeck; Charlene Short; Eric Strand	Charles Norris	Charles Norris
Production company(ies)	Universal Pictures	Universal Family and Home Entertainment	Raffaella Productions; Universal 1440 Entertainment	Castel Film Romania; Universal 1440 Entertainment	Raffaella Productions; Universal 1440 Entertainment
Distributor(s)	Universal Pictures	Universal Pictures Home Entertainment	Universal Pictures Home Entertainment	Universal Pictures Home Entertainment	Universal Pictures Home Entertainment

== Production ==
=== Recurring elements ===
==== Heart sharing ====
The dragons in the Dragonheart series can share half of their hearts with injured humans. Once bonded with a person, the human and dragon share every instance of each other's strength and pain, physical and emotional. In the prequels, those connected to a dragon can gain supernatural powers like pyrokinesis, enhanced strength, understanding the language of animals, sight-sharing, and the ability to sense the bonded dragon's presence.

==== The Old Code ====
Except for Dragonheart: Vengeance, the films contain characters that mention the Old Code, a code of honor and chivalry and a set of rules meant to maintain order, originating from King Arthur and his knights. The complete code, revealed by the Dragonheart novelization, is as follows:

Inside the table's circle,

Under the sacred sword.

A knight must vow to follow

The code that is unending,

Unending as the table—

A ring by honor bound.

A knight is sworn to valor,

His heart knows only virtue,

His blade defends the helpless,

His might upholds the weak,

His word speaks only truth,

His wrath undoes the wicked.

The right can never die,

If one man still recalls.

The words are not forgot,

If one voice speaks them clear.

The code forever shines,

If one heart holds it bright.

The films omit the first and third verses, only referring to the second. The first verse's two opening lines refer to the Round Table and King Arthur's sword Excalibur, respectively. The novelization also reveals the Old Code represented by the symbol of "a silver sword, hilt up, within a golden circle". Osric recites a modified version of the code when the king swears him in as his new advisor in A New Beginning.

==== The Dragon Heaven ====
Like humans, the dragons are sentient beings with their own culture and morals, even concepts of Heaven and Hell. Dutybound to be humanity's guardian angels and help humans achieve their potential for good, the dragons seek to live right and do noble deeds. Fulfilling that pledge will earn them passage into their heaven (the Draco constellation) when they die; thus, they fear doing wrong as it would doom their souls, which is why a dragon must be careful when sharing its heart. They prefer bonding with humans who they believe are worthy of the gift of life, as sharing a heartbond with someone possessing a tainted nature would risk the dragon's entry into heaven, and the dragon's spirit could vanish forever.

==== The bond between man and dragon ====
According to Draco in Dragonheart and Master Kwan in A New Beginning, dragons ruled the Earth long before humanity appeared. Seeing humanity's potential, the wisest dragon had the others vow to watch over man and help the humans grow. In ancient times, dragons and humans co-existed and considered each other friends, but as time passed and humanity progressed, they grew arrogant with the dragons' gifts and wisdom. People began shunning them and the Old Code's noble ideals, reducing the dragons from reverent figures to mere beasts, giving way to cynicism and magic slowly dying from the world.

== Music ==
For the sequel and prequels, composer Mark McKenzie consulted with each film's director and producer to determine where the Dragonheart theme should and should not play; they decided they should use it for "moments when hope and chivalry come alive through the great dragon". When working on A New Beginning, McKenzie incorporated Randy Edelman's Dragonheart theme from the first film in some tracks at producer De Laurentiis's request; using it as a guideline, McKenzie wrote leitmotifs that would easily transition with it.

=== Soundtracks ===
Title	U.S. release date	Length	Composer(s)	Label
Dragonheart (Original Motion Picture Soundtrack)	May 31, 1996	45:58	Randy Edelman	Geffen Records
Dragonheart: A New Beginning (Original Motion Picture Soundtrack)	August 15, 2000	39:34	Mark McKenzie	Universal Studios
Dragonheart 3: The Sorcerer's Curse (Original Motion Picture Soundtrack)	February 24, 2015	76:00	Mark McKenzie	Back Lot Music
Dragonheart: Battle for the Heartfire (Original Motion Picture Soundtrack)	June 13, 2017	39:53	Mark McKenzie	Back Lot Music
Dragonheart: Vengeance (Original Motion Picture Soundtrack)	February 4, 2020	47:00	Mark McKenzie	Back Lot Music

=== Singles ===
Title	U.S. release date	Length	Artist(s)	Label	Film
My Heart Goes With You	August 15, 2000	3:19	Rona Figueroa	Universal Studios	Dragonheart: A New Beginning

== Reception ==
=== Critical and public response ===
Film	Rotten Tomatoes	Metacritic	CinemaScore
Dragonheart	50% (30 reviews)	49 (27 reviews)	B+
Dragonheart: A New Beginning	40% (5 reviews)	N/A	N/A
Dragonheart 3: The Sorcerer's Curse	N/A	N/A	N/A
Dragonheart: Battle for the Heartfire	N/A	N/A	N/A
Dragonheart: Vengeance	N/A	N/A	N/A

== Other media ==
=== Literature ===
==== Novels ====
Dragonheart screenwriter Charles Edward Pogue penned the film's novelization. Pogue wrote the novelization based on his original screenplay, including "several new inspirations that weren't in any of the various drafts", and faithful to his and Johnson's vision of Dragonheart as the transcendent film it was written to be. Berkley Books published the book in June 1996. The first edition names Pogue as the sole author, but websites often list Dragonheart creator Patrick Read Johnson as the novel's co-author. Released in several languages and five editions in the U.S., Pogue's novelization received widespread critical acclaim. The novel also got an audio cassette release that is now out of print.

Adriana Gabriel adapted the film into a junior novelization in the same year. While the target audience for Pogue's novelization is young adults and older, Gabriel's junior adaptation is for younger readers and contains some stills from the film.

In 1999, Pearson Education published a book adapted from the junior novelization by Joanna Strange.

==== Books ====
Troll Books Staff released an activity book based on the film a month before its release.

In May 1996, Michael Bergman released a mass market paperback in the form of a fantasy card gamebook, with the distinction of being the first MUD book.

In June 1996, Jody Duncan wrote a book detailing the film's production titled The Making of Dragonheart, featuring behind-the-scenes photos and interviews from the cast and crew.

In September 1996, Leslie McGuire wrote a tie-in movie storybook.

=== Comics ===
In May and June 1996, Topps Comics adapted the film into a two-issue comic, splitting the film's plot into two parts. Both issues follow the story closely but with some changes. Some characters have different designs, some events occur at other locations than in the film, and some lines of dialogue are changed or moved around.

=== Video games ===
Acclaim Entertainment made and released Dragonheart: Fire & Steel, a multi-platform 2D hack and slash spin-off game, months after the film's release.

In the same year, Sound Source Interactive released an educational PC game, Dragonheart Medieval Creativity Center for Microsoft Windows and Classic Mac OS, aimed at children from grades K - 5. The game centers around developing skills in three categories (Creative, Memory, and Logic and Problem Solving) with ten activities, including coloring pages, puzzles, and riddles.

=== Merchandising ===
Kenner released a toy line based on the main characters, including dragons neither shown nor mentioned in the 1996 film. Revell (under their Promodeler line) produced and released 5000 units of a limited-edition vinyl model kit of Draco and Bowen, sculpted by John Dennett. Topps released collectible trading cards for the film.
