= Dragonheart (disambiguation) =

Dragonheart is a 1996 fantasy adventure film, starring Dennis Quaid and featuring the voice of Sean Connery.

Dragonheart may also refer to:

- The Dragonheart franchise related to the 1996 film
- Titles related to the 1996 film:
  - Dragonheart: Fire & Steel, a video game based on the 1996 film
  - Dragonheart: A New Beginning, the 2000 sequel to the 1996 film
  - Dragonheart 3: The Sorcerer's Curse, the 2015 prequel to the 1996 film
  - Dragonheart: Battle for the Heartfire, the 2017 prequel to the 1996 film
  - Dragonheart: Vengeance, the 2020 prequel to the 1996 film
- Dragonheart, a 2003 CD release of live concert by Elvis Presley
- Dragonheart (novel), a 2008 Dragonriders of Pern novel written by Todd McCaffrey
- Dragon Heart, a 2015 fantasy novel by Cecelia Holland
- DragonForce, an English power metal band formerly known as DragonHeart
