= The Last Legion =

2007 film by Doug Lefler

- Promotional film poster
- Directed by: Doug Lefler
- Screenplay by: Jez Butterworth; Tom Butterworth
- Story by: Carlo Carlei; Peter Rader; Valerio Massimo Manfredi
- Based on: The Last Legion by Valerio Massimo Manfredi
- Produced by: Dino De Laurentiis; Martha De Laurentiis; Raffaella De Laurentiis; Tarak Ben Ammar
- Starring: Colin Firth; Ben Kingsley; Aishwarya Rai; Peter Mullan; Kevin McKidd; John Hannah; Thomas Sangster
- Cinematography: Marco Pontecorvo
- Edited by: Simon Cozens
- Music by: Patrick Doyle
- Production company: De Laurentiis Company
- Distributed by: Momentum Pictures (United Kingdom); 01 Distribution (Italy); Quinta Communications (France); SPI International (Czech Republic and Slovakia)
- Release date: 17 August 2007
- Running time: 102 minutes
- Countries: United Kingdom; Italy; Tunisia; France; Slovakia
- Language: English
- Budget: $67 million
- Box office: $25.7 million

The Last Legion is a 2007 historical action adventure film directed by Doug Lefler and produced by Dino De Laurentiis. It is based on the 2002 novel of the same name by Valerio Massimo Manfredi. It stars Colin Firth, Ben Kingsley, Aishwarya Rai, Thomas Brodie-Sangster, Peter Mullan, Kevin McKidd, John Hannah, and Iain Glen. It premiered in Abu Dhabi on 6 April 2007.

The film is loosely inspired by the events of 5th-century European history, notably the collapse of the Western Roman Empire. This is coupled with other facts and legends from the history of Britain and fantastic elements from the legend of King Arthur to provide a basis for the Arthurian legend.

== Plot ==
In the Roman Empire of the 5th century, Ambrosinus, a Druid and member of a secret brotherhood protecting the sword of Julius Caesar, becomes tutor to the young newly crowned Western Emperor Romulus Augustulus. As Emperor, Romulus and his father Orestes refuse to give the Gothic warlord Odoacer a third of Italy. On the same day, Romulus meets the general of the Nova Invicta Legion, Aurelius.

Sometime after the coronation, Rome is attacked by the Goths. Most soldiers of the Nova Invicta legion are killed while Aurelius is stunned and left for dead. Orestes and his wife are killed by Odoacer's lieutenant, Wulfila, who captures Romulus. The next day, Odoacer, now the ruler of the Western Empire, plans to have Romulus killed. At Ambrosinus' urging, Odoacer spares and exiles Romulus to Capri instead, along with Ambrosinus himself while Wulfila and his men are sent to guard them. With Ambrosinus' help, Romulus enters a villa built during the reign of Emperor Tiberius and he discovers a hidden chamber there. Inside, Romulus finds a statue of Julius Caesar holding his sword, forged by a Chalybian smith during his invasion of Britain. Below the statue, Romulus reads a dais which states that the sword is made for "he who is destined to rule". This is interpreted as a prophecy and Romulus keeps the weapon.

Ambrosinus and Romulus are soon rescued by Aurelius and his surviving soldiers Vatrenus, Batiatus and Demetrius, accompanied by Mira, an Indian agent of the Eastern Empire. They take Romulus to a seaport where the Eastern Emperor has promised Romulus safe passage to Constantinople. They barely escape after they learn that the Eastern Empire has actually betrayed them and sided with Odoacer. Ambrosinus persuades Romulus to seek refuge in Britain, where the lost Roman legion may remain loyal. They are eventually followed by Goths under Wulfila, who covets Caesar's sword after learning of the prophecy. After crossing the Alps and the English Channel, the party reaches Britain and they travel to Hadrian's Wall. In there, they meet a man, revealed to be the legion's former commanding general, who tells the group that the legion had decided to disband and settle as farmers following the Empire's withdrawal. However, they all live in fear of a tyrannical warlord named Vortgyn, who is actually an old enemy of Ambrosinus. The group takes shelter in a small village where Romulus befriends a young girl named Igraine.

Meanwhile, Vortgyn teams up with Wulfila and the Goths in an attempt to get Caesar's sword so he can consolidate his position as ruler of Britain. Vortgyn attacks a number of settlements, including Igraine's village, in an attempt to force the villagers to surrender Romulus. Aurelius, wielding Caesar's sword, and Romulus mobilize an army at Hadrian's Wall to confront Vortgyn. In the ensuing battle, Vortgyn confronts Ambrosinus in his old sanctuary while Wulfila's army quickly overwhelm Ambrosinus and Romulus' forces until the mobilized Ninth Legion arrives to help. The battle's tide is turned when Ambrosinus, who has killed Vortgyn, returns holding his golden mask. After severely injuring Aurelius in a fierce duel, Wulfila is killed by Romulus using Caesar's sword. Repulsed by the deaths in the battle, Romulus disposes of his sword, lodging it in a large stone.

Many years later, Ambrosinus, now known by his Druid name Merlin, takes a young boy to the battlefield where he tells him of the events following the battle; Aurelius married Mira and the two raised Romulus as their son, and Romulus became a wise ruler under the name "Pendragon" with Igraine as his wife. The boy recognises Romulus as his father and Igraine as his mother. In a final scene, Caesar's sword is shown embedded in the stone, with moss covering the original Latin inscription, now only reading "E S CALIBVR".

== Cast ==
- Colin Firth as Aurelianus Ambrosius
- Ben Kingsley as Ambrosinus / Merlin
- Aishwarya Rai as Mira
- Peter Mullan as Odoacer
- Kevin McKidd as Wulfila
- John Hannah as Nestor
- Thomas Brodie-Sangster as Romulus Augustulus / Pendragon
- Owen Teale as Vatrenus
- Rupert Friend as Demetrius
- Nonso Anozie as Batiatus
- Harry Van Gorkum as Vortgyn
- Robert Pugh as Kustennin
- James Cosmo as Hrothgar
- Alexander Siddig as Theodorus Andronikos
- Murray McArthur as Tertius
- Iain Glen as Orestes
- Rory Finn as Young Arthur
- Alexandra Thomas-Davies as Ygraine
- Ferdinand Kingsley as Young Ambrosinus
- Lee Ingleby as Germanus

== Production notes ==
The film's producers include Dino De Laurentiis, Martha, his second wife, and Raffaella, his daughter by his first wife. Raffaella suggested director Doug Lefler due to his work on Dragonheart: A New Beginning, which she produced. Filming took place in Tunisia and at Spiš Castle in eastern Slovakia in 2005.

Valerio Massimo Manfredi helped adapt his novel to the screen. In an interview, he states at least four hours of footage was shot but ultimately shortened or cut, including scenes of the heroes' journey through the Alps and the English Channel.

For the role of Aurelius, executive producer Harvey Weinstein suggested Colin Firth, known for playing Fitzwilliam Darcy in Pride and Prejudice (1995) and more recently, Mark Darcy in the Bridget Jones films. Firth accepted the role due to the story, which he liked, and that it was very different from previous roles.

Thomas Sangster (Romulus) was one of the last to be cast. He had previously worked with Firth in Love Actually (2003) and Nanny McPhee (2006), and their familiarity with each other benefited both.

Sir Ben Kingsley was cast as Ambrosinus/Merlin after one meeting with Lefler. Kingsley was drawn to the mystique of the character, whom Lefler describes as a "warrior shaman". Kingsley also found the story interesting.

Aishwarya Rai was cast as Mira after the filmmakers decided "somebody that had a rare beauty... who could move very well", in Lefler's words, was ideal for the role. Lefler touted Rai's training in dance as an asset for her fight scenes. Like Firth, Rai took the role as a change of pace from her previous work.

The film's costumes were designed by Paolo Scalabrino, who had worked on Gangs of New York and Troy.

Lefler wanted each character to have a unique fighting style. Richard Ryan served as the film's sword master, helping him plan the fight scenes; he had worked on Troy and would work on Stardust as well.

The film's score was composed by Patrick Doyle.

== Reception ==
As of September 2026, the film had an average score of 37 out of 100 on Metacritic based on 12 reviews. On Rotten Tomatoes, the film holds a 15% approval rating, based on 54 reviews with an average rating of 4.30/10. The site's consensus reads, "With miscast leads and unoriginal, uninspired dialogue, The Last Legion pales in comparison to the recent cinematic epics it invokes".

Peter Bradshaw rates the film two out of five stars in a Guardian review, calling it "very silly but not without entertainment value." Nathan Rabin rates The Last Legion similarly in an A.V. Club review, writing: "Though it's never wise to underestimate the power or universal appeal of Rai's cleavage and lustrous hair, that's about all that sets the doggedly mediocre The Last Legion apart from every other sword-and-sandal epic about the origins of Camelot."

According to Men's Journal, the film's "spectacular premise and strange historical-fantasy mash-up began attracting renewed curiosity" years after its release, remaining "an intriguing cinematic oddity" due to it becoming a box-office bomb despite its ambition, all-star cast, and $67 million budget.

== See also ==
- List of historical drama films
- List of films set in ancient Rome
- Late Antiquity
- Battle of Mons Badonicus
- Anglo-Saxon settlement of Britain
