= Raffaella De Laurentiis =

Italian film producer (born 1952)

- De Laurentiis in the 1960s
- Born: 28 June 1952 (age 74); Rome, Italy
- Occupation: Film producer
- Spouse: Buzz Feitshans
- Parents: Dino De Laurentiis (father); Silvana Mangano (mother)
- Relatives: Veronica De Laurentiis (sister); Federico De Laurentiis (brother); Luigi De Laurentiis (uncle); Giada De Laurentiis (niece); Aurelio De Laurentiis (cousin)

Raffaella De Laurentiis (born 28 June 1952) is an Italian film producer. Films which she has produced include Conan the Barbarian, Conan the Destroyer, Dune, Prancer, Dragon: The Bruce Lee Story, all films in the Dragonheart series, The Forbidden Kingdom and Kull the Conqueror.

She is the daughter of film producer Dino De Laurentiis and actress Silvana Mangano. She is the sister of Veronica De Laurentiis, who is the mother of Food Network chef Giada De Laurentiis. She appeared in eighteen episodes of Giada's show Giada at Home.

== Career ==
De Laurentiis began working on films by contributing to the props and set departments of her father's productions. However, her first major credit came in 1973 as an assistant costume designer on Luchino Visconti's Ludwig. She then worked as a production assistant on Hurricane (1979) before stepping into a producer role at Dino De Laurentiis Productions.

In 1987, she left her role as president of production at De Laurentiis Entertainment Group (DEG). While at DEG, she read the script for Prancer and eventually produced the film as her first theatrical venture under her Raffaella Productions banner.

In 1989, she entered a long-term relationship with Universal Pictures wherein De Laurentiis would produce their projects for a two-year production agreement.

Three years after her father's death in 2010, De Laurentiis began pursuing a TV miniseries and theatrical biography about him.

== Filmography ==
=== Film ===
Year	Title	Director	Notes
1981	Beyond the Reef	Frank C. Clarke	
1982	Conan the Barbarian	John Milius	
1984	Conan the Destroyer	Richard Fleischer	
1984	Dune	David Lynch	
1986	Tai-Pan	Daryl Duke	
1989	Prancer	John Hancock	
1991	Backdraft	Ron Howard	
1991	Timebomb	Avi Nesher	
1993	Dragon: The Bruce Lee Story	Rob Cohen	Also unit production manager
1994	Trading Mom	Tia Brelis	
1996	Dragonheart	Rob Cohen	
1996	Daylight	Rob Cohen	Executive producer
1997	Kull the Conqueror	John Nicolella	Also production manager
1998	Black Dog	Kevin Hooks	
2000	Dragonheart: A New Beginning	Doug Lefler	Direct-to-video
2001	Prancer Returns	Joshua Butler	Direct-to-video
2004	Sky Captain and the World of Tomorrow	Kerry Conran	Executive producer
2007	The Last Legion	Doug Lefler	
2008	The Forbidden Kingdom	Rob Minkoff	Executive producer
2015	Dragonheart 3: The Sorcerer's Curse	Colin Teague	Direct-to-video
2017	Dragonheart: Battle for the Heartfire	Patrik Syversen	Direct-to-video
2017	What Happened to Monday	Tommy Wirkola	
2019	Backdraft 2	Gonzalo López-Gallego	Direct-to-video
2020	Dragonheart: Vengeance	Ivan Silvestrini	Direct-to-video
2022	Prancer: A Christmas Tale	Phil Hawkins	Direct-to-video

=== Television ===
Year	Title	Producer	Executive Producer	Notes
1994	Vanishing Son	No	Yes	TV movie
1994	Vanishing Son II	No	Yes	TV movie
1994	Vanishing Son III	No	Yes	TV movie
1994	Vanishing Son IV	No	Yes	TV movie
1995	Vanishing Son	No	Yes	
1997	The Guardian	Yes	No	TV movie
2001	Uprising	Yes	No	TV movie
2003	Stealing Christmas	No	Yes	TV movie
