= James Straus =

Film special effects artist

- Other name: James Satoru Straus
- Occupations: Visual effects artist and animation supervisor
- Years active: 1990-present

James Straus is a special effects artist who was nominated at the 69th Academy Awards for the film Dragonheart in the category of Best Visual Effects. His nomination was shared with Scott Squires, Phil Tippett and Kit West.

He is also an animation supervisor and works at Industrial Light and Magic.

== Selected filmography ==
- Alice in Wonderland (2010)
- G.I. Joe: The Rise of Cobra (2009)
- X-Men Origins: Wolverine (2009)
- Nim's Island (2008)
- The Mist (2007)
- Constantine (2005)
- Shrek (2001)
- Paulie (1998)
- Star Trek: Insurrection (1998)
- An American Werewolf in Paris (1997)
- Dragonheart (1996)
- Jumanji (1995)
- The Flintstones (1994)
- Jurassic Park (1993)
