= Jonjo O'Neill (actor) =

Northern Irish actor (born 1978)

- Born: 11 July 1978 (age 48); Belfast, Northern Ireland
- Education: Guildford School of Acting
- Occupation: Actor
- Years active: 1999–present

Jonjo O'Neill (born 11 July 1978) is an actor from Northern Ireland known for his stage and television work.

== Life and career ==
O'Neill was born in Belfast, grew up in the Whiterock Road area and was educated at St Mary's Grammar School and the Royal Belfast Academical Institution. Growing up he was passionate about musical theatre and was a member of the Ulster Youth Theatre and performed with the Ulster Theatre Company. In 1996 at the age of 18, he won a place and a full scholarship to the Guildford School of Acting, and moved to England. His first television role was the year he graduated from drama school, in Extremely Dangerous (1999).

A member of the Royal Shakespeare Company (RSC) 2009–2011 ensemble, his roles included Mercutio in Romeo and Juliet, Orlando in As You Like It, and Launcelot in Morte D'Arthur. His performances during the RSC's six-week residency at Park Avenue Armory in New York were hailed as "forceful" and "irresistible". At the 2012 World Shakespeare Festival in Stratford-upon-Avon, O'Neill played the title role in Roxana Silbert's production of Richard III at the Swan Theatre.

In 2012, he won praise for his performance in Lucy Prebble's play The Effect at the Royal National Theatre headlining alongside Billie Piper, whom he later appeared alongside in the 2013 fiftieth anniversary episode of Doctor Who: "The Day of the Doctor". He also appeared in "The Mortal Remains", the final vignette in the Coen brothers' film The Ballad of Buster Scruggs (2018).

== Filmography ==
=== Film ===
Year	Title	Role	Notes
2004	Fakers	Micky	
2008	Defiance	Lazar	
2010	As You Like It	Orlando	
2017	On Chesil Beach	Phil	
2018	The Ballad of Buster Scruggs	Englishman	Segment: "The Mortal Remains"
2019	Rare Beasts	Dougie	
2019	The Drifters	Chris	
2021	Here Before	Brendan	
2021	Operation Mincemeat	Teddy	
2022	All the Old Knives	Ernst Pul	
2023	The Last Rifleman	Major Willis	

=== Television ===
Year	Title	Role	Notes
1999	Extremely Dangerous	Passenger	Episode #1.1
2000	Sunburn	Ivan	Episode #2.7
2000	Holby City	Kieran	Episode: "Moving On"
2000	Thin Ice	Erik	Television film
2001	Band of Brothers	Replacement One	Episode: "Points"
2002	A Touch of Frost	Jeffrey Meadows	2 episodes
2003	Murphy's Law	Johnny McEvoy	Episode: "Manic Munday"
2003	I Fought the Law	Dessie	5 episodes
2005	The Year London Blew Up: 1974	Duggan	Television film
2007	Doctors	Stephen Bovey Richard Matthews	Episode: "One Life"
2007	The Bill	Billy McLaughlin	Episode: "Collateral Damage"
2012	Bad Sugar	Lipton	Television film
2013	Doctor Who	McGillop	Episode: "The Day of the Doctor"
2014	The Assets	Edward Lee Howard	Episode: "Trip to Vienna"
2014–2015	Constantine	Gary "Gaz" Lester	3 episodes
2014–2016	The Fall	Tom Stagg	7 episodes
2015	Dragonheart 3: The Sorcerer's Curse	Brude	Direct-to-video
2015	Fortitude	Ciaran Donnelly	7 episodes
2017	Vera	Gary Tovey	Episode: "The Blanket Mire"
2017	Oasis	David Morgan	Television film
2018	Patrick Melrose	Seamus Dourke	Episode: "Mother's Milk"
2019–2021	Pennyworth	Aleister Crowley	5 episodes
2020	The Queen's Gambit	Mr. Ganz	Episode: "Openings"
2020	Homeland	Doug	Episode: "Deception Indicated"
2021	The Irregulars	Mycroft Holmes	2 episodes
2021	Dalgliesh	Julius Marsh	2 episodes
2021	Stephen	DI Shaun Keep	3 episodes
2022	Bad Sisters	Donal Flynn	9 episodes
2022	Bloodlands	Ryan Savage	3 episodes
2024	The New Look	Bernard Dior	2 episodes
2024	The Day of the Jackal	Edward Carver	Upcoming
2024	Nightsleeper	Mark "Hud" Hudson	5 episodes
2025	Andor	Captain Kaido	2 episodes

== Theatre ==
- The Frogs (1999) – Nottingham Playhouse
- Translations (2000) – Watford Palace Theatre
- Half a Sixpence (2000) – West Yorkshire Playhouse
- Dolly West's Kitchen (2001) – Leicester Haymarket Theatre
- Observe the Sons of Ulster (2002) – The Pleasance Theatre
- Murmuring Judges (2003) – Birmingham Repertory Theatre
- A View from the Bridge (2003) – Birmingham Repertory Theatre/West Yorkshire Playhouse
- Paradise Lost (2004) – Northampton Theatre Royal
- Headcase (2004) – Royal Shakespeare Company
- Speaking Like Magpies (2005) – Royal Shakespeare Company
- Sejanus: His Fall (2005) – Royal Shakespeare Company
- Believe What You Will (2005) – Royal Shakespeare Company
- A New Way to Please You (2005) – Royal Shakespeare Company
- Faustus (2006) – Hampstead Theatre
- Someone Else's Shoes (2007) – Soho Theatre
- As You Like It (2008) – Young Vic Theatre
- Comedy of Errors (2009) – Royal Shakespeare Company
- As you Like It (2009) – Royal Shakespeare Company
- The Drunks (2009) – Royal Shakespeare Company
- Romeo and Juliet (2010) – Royal Shakespeare Company
- Morte D'Arthur (2010) – Royal Shakespeare Company
- Ahasverus (2011) – Royal Shakespeare Company
- Silence (2011) – Royal Shakespeare Company
- Richard III (2012) – Royal Shakespeare Company
- The Effect (2012–13) – Royal National Theatre
- Collaborations (2013) – Royal Court Theatre
- The President Has come to See You (2013) – Royal Court Theatre
- Talk Show (2013) – Royal Court Theatre
- The Get Out (2014) – Royal Court Theatre
- The Crucible by Arthur Miller – Royal Exchange Theatre Manchester (2015) for which he was nominated for a Manchester Theatre Award
- Cymbeline (2015–16) – Globe Theatre
- The Unreachable (2016) – Royal Court Theatre
- The Bash (2016) – Royal Court Theatre 50th Anniversary Gala, performing as Frank-N-Furter from The Rocky Horror Show
- Victory Condition (2017) – Royal Court Theatre
- The Prudes (2018) – Royal Court Theatre
- Pinter at the Pinter (2018) – Harold Pinter Theatre
- Dear Elizabeth (2019) – Gate Theatre (one performance only)
