= Doug Lefler =

American film producer

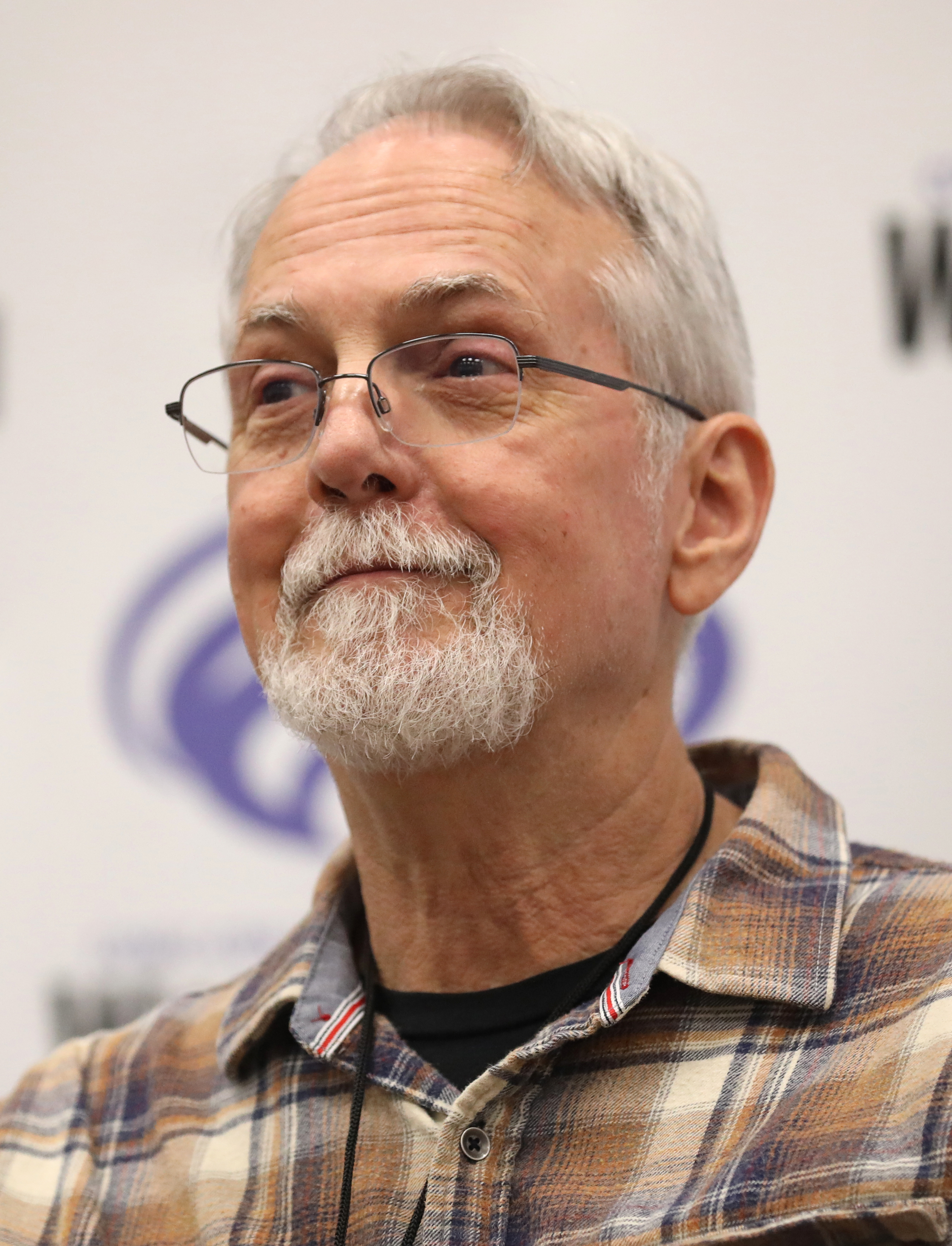
- Lefler at the 2024 WonderCon
- Born: Southern California, U.S.
- Education: California Institute of the Arts
- Occupations: Film director, screenwriter, film producer, storyboard artist, animator
- Known for: Dragonheart: A New Beginning; The Last Legion

Doug Lefler (born in California) is an American film director, screenwriter, film producer and storyboard artist, best known as director of the Dragonheart fantasy adventure film sequel Dragonheart: A New Beginning and The Last Legion.

== Career ==
Lefler was born in Southern California, and started making his first home movies at the age of twelve. He started in the film industry as an animator, having made short films as a child and then attended the California Institute of the Arts. His classmates included Tim Burton, John Lasseter, John Musker and Brad Bird. After two years, he worked for Disney and other studios for several years as a storyboard artist and animator, before progressing to directing. He worked for many years as a writer and storyboard artist on live-action features before getting his first chance to direct second unit on Sam Raimi's Army of Darkness in 1991.

== Filmography ==
=== Film ===
Writer

- Steel Dawn (1987)

Director

- Dragonheart: A New Beginning (2000)
- The Last Legion (2007)

2nd unit director

- Army of Darkness (1991)
- A Simple Plan (1998)
- Spider-Man (2002)

=== Television ===
Year	Title	Notes
1994	Hercules and the Circle of Fire	TV movie
1994–1995	Hercules: The Legendary Journeys	Episodes "The Wrong Path" and "The Road to Calydon"
1995	JAG	Episode: "Déjà Vu"
1995–1999	Xena: Warrior Princess	3 episodes
1998	Mortal Kombat: Conquest	Episode "Cold Reality"
1998	Babylon 5	Episode "Day of the Dead"
