= Mark McKenzie (composer) =

American film composer

- Born: Lake City, Minnesota, U.S.
- Genres: Film, symphonic, choral
- Occupation: Composer
- Years active: 1985–present

Mark McKenzie is an American film composer and orchestrator.

== Life and career ==
Mark McKenzie was born in Lake City, Minnesota. He received his undergraduate degree in music composition from the University of Wisconsin-Eau Claire, studying with David and Nancy Baker, Michael Cunningham and Ivar Lunde. He received his Masters and Doctorate in music composition from the USC Thornton School of Music in Los Angeles where he studied with Pierre Boulez, Morten Lauridsen, Witold Lutoslawski, Anthony Vazzana and Frederick Lesemann.

The magazine Variety wrote, "Mark McKenzie's commanding orchestral prowess puts him among the foremost symphonists in Hollywood." The 125 Motion pictures that McKenzie has orchestrated or composed have grossed over 13 billion dollars at the box office. The Los Angeles Times, The Hollywood Reporter and numerous film music journals call Mark's music "timeless, profound, the most lyrical and emotionally resonant music ever written for film, triumphant, sublime, tender, inspiring, ravishing, lush, soulful, magical, the essence of unconditional love, a tribute to the overpowering inherent goodness alive within the human soul and a boundless expression of joy."

=== Film composer ===
Films composed by McKenzie include:

- Frank and Jesse (1994)
- My Family (1995)
- The Disappearance of Garcia Lorca (1996)
- Dragonheart: A New Beginning (direct-to-video, 2000)
- Blizzard (2003)
- The Ultimate Gift (2006)
- Saving Sarah Cain (TV film, 2007)
- The Ultimate Life (2013)
- Dragonheart 3: The Sorcerer's Curse (direct-to-video, 2015)
- Max & Me (2016)
- Dragonheart: Battle for the Heartfire (direct-to-video, 2017)
- Dragonheart: Vengeance (direct-to-video, 2020)

=== Film orchestrator ===
McKenzie has orchestrated over 100 movies, assisting composers including Danny Elfman, John Barry, Bruce Broughton, Randy Edelman, Jerry Goldsmith, Mark Isham, Michael Jackson, Paul McCartney, James Newton Howard, Nile Rodgers, Alan Silvestri, Marc Shaiman, and John Williams. These films include:

- Dances with Wolves (1990)
- Sister Act (1992)
- The Nightmare Before Christmas (1993)
- Sleepless in Seattle (1993)
- Mission: Impossible (1996)
- Good Will Hunting (1997)
- Men in Black (1997)
- The Mummy Returns (2001)
- Lilo & Stitch (2002)
- Spider-Man (2002)
- Spider-Man 2 (2004)
- Mr. & Mrs. Smith (2005)
- Ice Age: The Meltdown (2006)

McKenzie orchestrated Jerry Goldsmith's final six films, including The Sum of All Fears, Star Trek: Nemesis, and Along Came a Spider. In addition Goldsmith used Mark to compose the final 7 minute action sequence for the Robert Redford film The Last Castle. He repeatedly called McKenzie "a god-send" and "one of my angels." Intrada Records re-released the entire Goldsmith soundtrack to The Last Castle and it includes McKenzie's "Prison Uprising" composition.

=== Other work ===
McKenzie composed the opening and closing logo music to the longest running television series in history, Hallmark Hall of Fame.

McKenzie's original compositions have been used at the Olympics, the Academy Awards, Disney World, Wimbledon, the Crystal Cathedral, and Disneyland Paris. Mark McKenzie's concert work The Lion and the Mouse has been performed by The Pittsburgh Symphony Orchestra, The Utah Symphony, Lexington Symphony Orchestra, The Bangor Symphony (Canada), the San Diego Symphony and The University of Wisconsin.

McKenzie's Suite from "The Greatest Miracle" was performed live with choir and orchestra at World Youth Day with Pope Benedict the 16th attending. His choral work "Gloria" for choir, orchestra and children's choir was premiered on the Hour of Power for its 2000th broadcast service and has gone on to receive repeated performances across the U.S.

== Awards and nominations ==
- Dances With Wolves (1990), which McKenzie orchestrated, won the Academy Award for Best Original Score.
- Men in Black (1997), which McKenzie orchestrated, was nominated for the Academy Award for Best Original Score.
- Mark's score to El Gran Milagro (2011) for multiple choirs, orchestra, soloists and the London Boys choir Libera won "Best Indie Score" at the "Hollywood Music in Media Awards" and was nominated as Best Score of the Year and Best Animated Score of the Year by the International Film Music Critics Association.
- The Max & Me soundtrack (2016) was nominated by the International Film Music Critics Association as Best Score of the Year, and won the IFMCA Best Animated Score of the Year (over Spider-Man: Into the Spider-Verse, Incredibles 2 and Isle of Dogs).

== Memberships ==
Mark is a board member of the Society of Composers & lyricists, a voting member of the Motion Picture Academy composer's branch (Oscars), Academy of Television Arts & Sciences (Emmys), The Recording Academy (Grammys) and the American Society of Music Arrangers and Composers, and belongs to the Broadcast Music, Inc. Performing Rights Organization.
