= Cecelia Holland bibliography =

A list of works by or about American historical novelist Cecelia Holland.

== Historical fiction ==
=== Novels ===
- The Firedrake (1966) – After wandering across Western Europe, Laeghaire, an Irish mercenary knight, finds himself reluctantly accompanying the Norman invaders at the Battle of Hastings in 1066. The novel spans a period of years and focusing on the historical period and Laeghaire's life as a mercenary.
- Rakóssy (1967) – Rakóssy, a Hungarian aristocrat with a wide independent streak, fights the Ottoman Turkish invaders in 1526.
- The Kings in Winter (1968) – The authority of High King Brian Boru is being contested by other clans and by the Danish invaders, and Muirtagh O'Cullinane must balance his own honor and that of his clan against loyalties to the various kings. It all comes to a head at the Battle of Clontarf in 1014.
- Until the Sun Falls (1969) – Psin, a senior general of reconnaissance from the steppe, takes part in the Mongol conquest of Russia and the nearly successful invasion of Eastern Europe in the first generation following the death of Genghis Khan, c. 1240. Portrayal of Mongol horde conquest, way of life, as seen through Psin, a Merkit rather than a Mongol and his fights with his son who is coming into his own in the army. Told in the 3rd person.
- Antichrist (1970) – Frederick II, Holy Roman Emperor of the Hohenstaufen leads a successful crusade of liberation to Jerusalem in 1229. 40. [Published in the UK as The Wonder of the World.]
- The Earl (1971) – Fulk, the Anglo-Norman Earl of Stafford, carries out his political and family schemes but manages to maintain his loyalties during The Anarchy that followed the death of Henry I of England, c. 1140. [Published in the UK as A Hammer for Princes.]
- The Death of Attila (1973) – Tacs, a young, ne'er-do-well Hunnish warrior, becomes unlikely friends with Dietric, son of a subject king, in the harsh world of 453.
- Great Maria (1974) – Maria is the daughter of a Norman robber baron in Southern Italy in the late 11th century, forced to marry her father's choice, the young and ambitious Richard d'Alene, though she prefers his brother, Roger. She must struggle to maintain her independence and identity during the Norman conquest of Sicily. This is often described as Holland's first "feminist" novel.
- Floating Worlds (1976) – Unemployed Paula Mendoza, living in New York thousands of years in the future, becomes an interplanetary diplomat working with the Styths, another type of human who have built cities inside the gas planets of the Solar System. Mendoza eventually returns to Earth, where she lives through an invasion from both Mars and the Styth Empire. An anarchist at heart, she uses all her wits to navigate politically, and survive physically. Holland’s only science fiction novel.
- Two Ravens (1977) – Bjarni Hoskuldsson, a pagan Icelander trying to maintain the old values in an increasing Christian world of the early 12th century, leaves the family's Icelandic farm in search of adventure in the England of William Rufus; he eventually returns to Iceland to finally make his presence felt.
- Valley of the Kings (1977) [credited to Elizabeth Eliot Carter in earlier editions] – Structured as two independent narratives, one about the last years and death of Tutankhamen, the other about Howard Carter's search for the pharaoh's tomb in the 1920s.
- City of God (1979) – In 16th-century Rome during the Borgia period, Nicholas Dawson—a highly educated homosexual and the secretary to the Florentine ambassador—is drawn into dangerous political intrigue by the ruthless Cesare Borgia.
- The Sea Beggars (1982) – A young Dutchman joins the revolt by the Netherlands in the 1590s (led by pirates) against their Spanish overlords and the Inquisition.
- The Belt of Gold (1984) – Hagen, an unsophisticated Frankish pilgrim in Constantinople at the beginning of the 9th century, blunders into politics at the court of the Empress Irene, where nothing has value but power. Holland herself does not consider this a particularly successful work, "maybe because it didn't take long enough to grow."
- Pillar of the Sky (1985) - The charismatic and visionary Moloquin – "the unwanted"—leads The People to erect the stone circle at Stonehenge on Salisbury Plain, and to defend it from their enemies.
- The Lords of Vaumartin (1988) – Everard de Vaumartin, a young, orphaned French aristocrat driven from his home, decides to immerse himself in books rather than continuing his knightly training, and experiences the turmoil of Paris of the mid-14th century, including chivalry vs. political realism, the Black Death, and the First Commune.
- The Bear Flag (1990) – After her husband's death on the trek across the Great Plains, Catherine "Cat" Reilly finds a home in the new state of California in the 1850s, in a world driven by the forces of Manifest Destiny. ISBN 978-1953034625
- Pacific Street (1992) - Mitya, a taciturn American Indian man, and Frances Hardheart, a sharp-tongued and manipulative escaped slave, come together with other lost souls and make their way in San Francisco during the first years of the California Gold Rush. ISBN 978-1953034748
- Jerusalem (1996) – Beginning with the Christian victory at the Battle of Montgisard, Norman Templar Sir Rannulf Fitzwilliam struggles to maintain his personal values (which serve him better in war than in diplomacy) while trying to survive the politics of the Latin Kingdom of Jerusalem, all of which come to an end at the Battle of Hattin in 1187. Holland considers this her best novel.
- The Angel and the Sword (2000) – The young Princess Ragny of Spain, having escaped from her disreputable father, disguises and transforms herself into the bold and fearless warrior, Roderick, seeking revenge for her mother's murder and saving Paris from Viking assault in 861. Based on the medieval fabliau of Roderick the Beardless. ISBN 978-1953034465
- Heart of the World (2020), set during the Siege of Bagdad of 1258 by the Mongols. ISBN 978-1953034069
- Jack (2021) - During the summer of 1776, a young woman ran away from her fleeing family to join the Continental Army dressed as a man after the British Army started to land troops near her home on Long Island to reclaim the colony from the rebels. ISBN 978-1956015249

=== Series ===
==== California ====
1. Railroad Schemes (1997) – Irish American outlaw "King" Callahan and the young orphaned Lily Viner from the Virginia City mining camps battle the railroad barons in Los Angeles (new terminus of the Southern Pacific Railroad) during the 1870s. Holland considers this her second-best novel. ISBN 978-1953034267
2. Lily Nevada (1999) – Sequel to Railroad Schemes. The twenty-year-old Lily Viner, escaping her shattered past, becomes an actress in San Francisco and leads a double life in trying to deal with the return of the railroad detective who killed both her outlaw father and Callahan, her foster-father—and also tries to find her mother, who disappeared when Lily was an infant.

==== Corban Loosestrife series ====
Holland spent between 2000 and 2010 writing the six novels in her Corban Loosestrife series, set in the world of the Vikings over a period of some fifty years.

1. The Soul Thief (2002) – The first in the series, this novel takes place in the mid-10th century in the Norse kingdom of Jórvík (York). It focuses on the struggles of Corban Loosestrife and his twin sister, kidnapped from Ireland.
2. The Witches' Kitchen (2004) – Fifteen years after killing Erik Blódøx (English, Bloodaxe), Norse King of Jórvík, the renegade Corban Loosestrife is living thinly but idyllically with his family on the coast of Vinland, until warfare among the local tribes and trouble from back home force him to return to Denmark, where he again becomes embroiled in politics.
3. The Serpent Dreamer (2005) – His service to the King of the Danes concluded, Corban returns to his new home in Vinland to find the colony destroyed, his beloved wife dead, and his twin sister Mav, with whom he shared a mystic bond, transfigured into a numinous being caught between this world and the next. Seeking shelter with a nearby tribe, Corban is shunned for his pale skin and dark, coarse hair, and feared for his strange powers to make fire and cut through the toughest skins with his magic blade.
4. Varanger (2008) – Corban Loosestrife's son Conn is a clever and strong leader of men; his cousin, the god-touched Raef, is his shield and navigator. They have joined a fur-trading ship to Russia, and are forced to over-winter in Novgorod. While there, they take service with the leader of the Rus, Dobrynya, and with him travel south to Kyiv, and then on with a raiding party into the northern reaches of the Byzantine Empire.
5. The High City (2009) – Raef Corbansson arrives, rowing, in Constantinople in time for Bardas Phokas the Younger's rebellion against Basil II (c.989). He catches the eye of the Empress Helena, but not in a good way! Byzantine politics, the formation of the Varangian Guard, life in the big city is interesting for someone of Raef's fey sensitivities. It doesn't take long for him to fatally irritate Basil, too. (The book jacket is in error about whose wife Helena is — NOT Basil's, but his brother Constantine VIII's.)
6. Kings of the North (2010) – Raef returns to Jorvik and meets his destiny, along with several actual historical figures, among them Æthelred the Unready and Knut Sweynsson.

=== Princess Eleanor ===
1. The Secret Eleanor: A Novel of Eleanor of Aquitaine (2010), set in the years 1151–1152, is centered on Eleanor's relationship with her sister Petronilla; it narrates the meeting of Eleanor and Henry Plantagenet, the beginning of their love affair, Eleanor's annulment of her marriage to Louis VII, and Petronilla's role helping her sister in these events, in a fictional secret history concordant with the known facts of their lives.
2. Nora's Song (2013), short story in the cross-genre anthology Dangerous Women edited by Martin and Dozois, about Princess Eleanor and her observations of the royal household of Henry II of England and (future) Richard I.

=== Short stories ===
- "The King of Norway" (2010), short story in the cross-genre anthology Warriors edited by George R. R. Martin and Gardner Dozois.
- "Demon Lover" (2010), short story in the cross-genre anthology Songs of Love and Death edited by Martin and Gardner Dozois, an erotic fairy tale.

== Modern novels ==
- Home Ground (1981) – A band of post-1960s hippies, searching for a haven where they can recover and work out what to do with their changed lives, struggles to revive a failing commune in Northern California during the 1980s. A contemporary novel when it was written, it has now become almost as "historical" as most of her other works.

== Speculative fiction ==
- Floating Worlds (1976) – Anarchist Paula Mendoza climbs from unemployed obscurity to become a diplomat trying to keep the peace (with startling and unconventional methods) between Earth, the Mars colonists, and the mutant Styths from the outer planets of the solar system. This novel is notable for its sexual content, its feminist theme, and its literary quality—all comparable to the mid-70s work of Joanna Russ and Ursula K. Le Guin.
- Dragon Heart (2015)

== Media tie-in fiction ==
- Lucky Lady, under the pseudonym "Julie Rood" (Bantam Books, 1975), a novelization of the screenplay by Willard Huyck and Gloria Katz.

== Children's fiction ==
- Ghost on the Steppe (1969) – Spun off from Until the Sun Falls, this is the story of a young Mongol boy tracking down a mysterious killer on the steppe.
- The King's Road (1970) – Spun off from Antichrist, this tells of the young Frederick Hohenstaufen, on the run from assassins in Sicily, discovering his true identity.

== Non-fiction ==
- The Story of Anna and the King (1999) – Published as a companion book to the Jodie Foster film, Anna and the King (1999), it includes (in addition to notes on and photographs of the making of the film itself) material on the real Anna Leonowens and the real King Mongkut, with sections on Siamese history, religion, and culture.
- An Ordinary Woman (1999) – A fictionalized biography of Nancy Kelsey, the first American woman to reach California by crossing the Sierras. She arrived in 1841 after a six-month trek—on foot, pregnant, carrying her two-year-old daughter, and only nineteen years old. She later contributed the petticoats from which the original Bear Flag of the Republic of California was made. Nancy lived until 1896 and Holland relies strongly on her letters and on archival material.
- Blood on the Tracks (2011) – A non-fiction account of the Great Railroad Strike of 1877 (Amazon Kindle Single).
- Finding California (2011) – Accounts of farmers and their families who travelled west to California, based on their diaries and other writings (Amazon Kindle Single).

== Speculative non-fiction ==
- Holland, Cecelia (2000). "The death that saved Europe : the Mongols turn back". In Cowley, Robert (ed.). What if? The world's foremost military historians imagine what might have been.
- "Repulse at Hastings, October 14, 1066" (2001) in What If? 2: Eminent Historians Imagine What Might Have Been, edited by Robert Cowley
- "The Revolution of 1877" (2003) in What Ifs? of American History, edited by Robert Cowley

== Book reviews ==
Date	Review article	Work(s) reviewed
December 2013	Holland, Cecelia (Dec 2013). "Locus Looks at Books : Divers Hands". Locus (635): 22.	Griffith, Nicola (2013). Hild : a novel. New York: Farrar, Straus & Giroux.

== Critical studies and reviews of Holland's work ==
The angel and the sword

- Killheffer, Robert K. J. (Jan 2001). "Books". F&SF. 100 (1): 29–36.
