= Harry Van Gorkum =

English actor

- Born: London, England
- Occupation: Actor
- Years active: 1982–present

Harry Van Gorkum is an English actor. Born in London, he studied at Lancaster University before becoming a stage actor. He later moved to the United States, where he has appeared in more than 30 films since 1989.

== Filmography ==
Film
| Year | Title | Role | Notes |
|---|---|---|---|
| 1995 | Other American Fables | Marco | |
| 1997 | Batman & Robin | M.C. | |
| 1998 | Hamilton | Seaman Jones | |
| 2000 | Dragonheart: A New Beginning | Lord Osric of Crossley / Griffin the Dragon | Voice of Griffin |
| 2000 | Escape Under Pressure | Crowley | |
| 2000 | Gone in 60 Seconds | Forge | |
| 2000 | Deep Core | Alan Morrisey | |
| 2001 | Firetrap | Roger | |
| 2001 | One Night at McCool's | Psychic Guru | |
| 2001 | Face the Music | Puzzles Levy | |
| 2002 | Avenging Angelo | Kip Barret | |
| 2003 | The Foreigner | Jerome Van Aiken | |
| 2003 | Tears of the Sun | Carrier Reporter | |
| 2003 | Agent Cody Banks | Double Agent | |
| 2005 | Break a Leg | 'Secret Scruples' Producer #1 | |
| 2005 | The Basement | Chipper | |
| 2007 | The Last Legion | Vortgyn | |
| 2008 | Adventures of Power | Australian Reporter | |
| 2009 | The Pink Panther 2 | Ticketed Driver | |
| 2010 | The Karate Kid | Music Instructor | |
| 2013 | The Mortal Instruments: City of Bones | Alaric / Werewolf | |
| 2015 | Our Brand Is Crisis | Interviewer (Main Title Sequence) | |
| 2015 | Don't Wake Mommy | Dr. Bob Everett | |
| 2017 | The 12th Man | Commander Crawley | |
| 2018 | Eruption: LA | Professor Irwin | |
| 2020 | Broken Halos | Father Murphy | |

TV
| Year | Title | Role | Notes |
|---|---|---|---|
| 1995 | First Time Out | Freddy | 7 episodes |
| 1996 | Seinfeld | Craig Stewart | Episode: "The Wig Master" |
| 1996–1998 | The Nanny | Nigel Sheffield | 3 episodes |
| 1997 | JAG | Lorcan Barnes | Episode: "Trinity" |
| 1999 | Just Shoot Me! | Simon | Episode: "An Axe to Grind" |
| 1999 | Nash Bridges | Alex Crow | Episode: "Get Bananas" |
| 2000 | The Fearing Mind | Bill Fearing | Main role |
| 2000 | Will & Grace | Porcelain Paul | Episode: "Tea and a Total Lack of Sympathy" |
| 2002 | Charmed | Kurzon | Episode: "The Three Faces of Phoebe" |
| 2002 | Friends | Don | Episode: "The One Where Joey Tells Rachel" |
| 2003 | JAG | Lt. Whitehall | Episode: "Friendly Fire" |
| 2006 | S.S. Doomtrooper | Sergeant Digger | TV movie |
| 2010 | 24 | Louis Dalton | 2 episodes |
| 2011 | Wizards of Waverly Place | Mr. Greybeck | Episode: "Meet the Werewolves" |
| 2013 | Happily Divorced | Neil | 4 episodes |
| 2014–2015 | Austin & Ally | Armand Bianchi | 2 episodes |
| 2015 | NCIS | Alton Brinkman | Episode: "Blood Brothers" |
