= Dragonheart 3: The Sorcerer's Curse =

2015 film by Colin Teague

- Promotional poster
- Directed by: Colin Teague
- Written by: Matthew Feitshans
- Based on: Dragonheart by Patrick Read Johnson & Charles Edward Pogue
- Produced by: Raffaella De Laurentiis
- Starring: Julian Morris; Tamzin Merchant; Jassa Ahluwalia; Jonjo O'Neill; Ben Kingsley
- Cinematography: David Luther
- Edited by: Fiona Colbeck; Charlene Short; Eric Strand
- Music by: Mark McKenzie
- Production companies: Raffaella Productions; Universal 1440 Entertainment
- Distributed by: Universal Pictures Home Entertainment
- Release date: February 10, 2015
- Running time: 97 minutes
- Countries: United States; United Kingdom; Romania
- Language: English

Dragonheart 3: The Sorcerer's Curse is a 2015 fantasy adventure film directed by Colin Teague and released direct-to-video. The third film in the Dragonheart franchise, it is a prequel to the original film.

== Plot ==
In the 9th century Northern Britain, a druid circle foresees a "falling star" from the constellation Draco, with Brude - one of the druids - summoning a Pict clan known as the "Painted tribe" to slaughter the druids and lead the clans to war against the southern kingdoms over Hadrian's Wall. A druid apprentice called Lorne escapes the druids' slaughter.

Gareth and a group of squires undergo their final tests on the wall's southern side to prove they are ready to be knighted. Gareth proves himself the best fighter but fails to collect enough money from the peasants; disappointed, his superior Sir Horsa refuses to knight him and tells Gareth that he owes him 100 crowns, after which he will give Gareth his knighthood. With nowhere to go, Gareth gets taken in by a peasant couple who could not pay him. That night, a meteor falls to Earth on the wall's north side, with Gareth stealing one of the knighted squires' swords and going to find the meteor after the couple told him it would contain riches.

Gareth finds the meteor but bursts open, revealing a dragon with nine eggs. The dragon proceeds to attack the Painted tribe members that also tracked down the meteor, with Gareth saving one of the dragon's eggs despite the warriors badly wounding him. Impressed by Gareth's mercy, the dragon shares its heart with him, saving Gareth's life. Then Brude curses the dragon before claiming the eggs. Lorne rescues Gareth and explains dragons and the bond Gareth now shares with the dragon. Gareth meets the rebel leader Rhonu, her uncle Traevor, and the clans who oppose Brude, hoping Gareth will get the dragon to fight for them. Gareth meets the dragon again, discovering it can now talk. Gareth names it Drago, who says he needs help retrieving the eggs. The group goes to Brude's campsite; Drago fails to rescue the eggs due to the curse rendering him powerless during daylight or by the light of a flame, and he explains his purpose to raise the young dragons he brought as friends to humanity. Gareth's attempt fails, with the painted clan capturing him. Brude intends to kill him but stops upon learning about Gareth's connection with Drago. With Rhonu and Lorne's help, he successfully escapes with the eggs.

Gareth convinces the group to head towards the wall, and Rhonu tells Traevor to gather the clans opposing Brude. Traveling with Rhonu and Lorne, the trio has to journey on foot after accidentally destroying an egg; Drago unsuccessfully tries teaching Gareth how to shadow-jump along the way. Lorne tells Gareth and Rhonu that Brude cast the Sorcerer's Curse on Drago, and Drago will be under Brude's control by the full moon. While attempting to rescue a group of the painted clan's prisoners, Gareth shows bravery, briefly freeing Drago from the curse before Brude recasts it. After Gareth sacrifices one of the dragon eggs and shadow-jumps to safety, the trio escapes Brude and the clan. Before reaching the wall, Gareth confesses to Drago that he is not a knight and the South has no respect for King Arthur's Old Code, but Drago still considers Gareth his friend before leaving for Brude's location.

Reaching the gate, Gareth, Lorne, and Rhonu get arrested, and the dragon eggs seized upon learning of the Painted clan heading towards the wall. Drago, now under Brude's control, and the Painted tribe attack at the full moon, but Lorne's magic helps Gareth and Rhonu escape. As Gareth disrupts the sale of the dragon eggs and battles Sir Horsa to protect them, his brave act frees Drago, who then aids both the soldiers and the northern clans led by Traevor. Gareth slays Sir Horsa while Rhonu battles and kills Brude, although she herself is fatally wounded. With Brude dead and Drago free, the remainder of the Painted tribe retreats. After the battle, Gareth tends to Rhonu, who is saved by an unhatched dragon sharing its heart with her. Gareth becomes a knight and the settlement's leader, with peace achieved between the North and South as Hadrian's Wall is renamed the Dragon's Gate. Gareth and Rhonu express their love for each other, and the baby dragon that saved Rhonu begins hatching.

== Cast ==
- Julian Morris as Gareth
- Ben Kingsley as Drago (voice)
- Jassa Ahluwalia as Lorne
- Jonjo O'Neill as Brude
- Jake Curran as Traevor
- Tamzin Merchant as Rhonu
- Dominic Mafham as Sir Horsa
- Nadiv Molcho as Merchant
- Christopher Fairbank as Potter
- Ozama Oancea as Begilda
- Harry Lister Smith as Kalin
- Daniel Everitt-Lock as Cuthbert
- Serban Celea as Sir Wulfric
- Duncan Preston as Elisedd
- Ioan Coman as Vendor
- Edouard Philipponat as Squire Edouard
- Pavel Ulici as Toothless Pict
- Vlad Rădescu as Villager
- Matthew Feitshans as Matthaeus
- Denis Stefan as Lead Pict

== Production ==
=== Development ===
Long rumored and speculated upon by fans of the previous two films, a third installment in the Dragonheart franchise was announced during the summer of 2014 to have been green-lit by Universal Studios Home Entertainment. The budget for the CGI effects work for Drago alone was $7,000,000.

Raffaella De Laurentiis, who produced the two previous films in the franchise, Dragonheart and Dragonheart: A New Beginning, reprised her role in development as a producer for the third installment. Her stepson Matthew Feitshans is a screenwriter and development executive regarding storytelling and was chosen as the writer for the film. In addition, this was the first film that he wrote for.

=== Casting ===
Julian Morris was cast for the main lead character Gareth.

=== Filming ===
The filming began around 2013 with filming locations taking place in Romania.

=== Music ===
Dragonheart 3: The Sorcerer's Curse (Original Motion Picture Soundtrack)

Soundtrack album by Mark McKenzie
- Released: February 24, 2015
- Genre: Film score
- Length: 76:00
- Label: Back Lot Music
- Producer: Mark McKenzie

The score was composed by Mark McKenzie, who previously composed the score for Dragonheart: A New Beginning. The score contains the original theme by Randy Edelman from the first film.

All tracks are written by Mark McKenzie.

Dragonheart 3: The Sorcerer's Curse (Original Motion Picture Soundtrack)
No.	Title	Length
1.	"Clans Stirred to War"	4:55
2.	"Jousting Final Test to Knighthood"	1:56
3.	"Pay Up!"	1:29
4.	"One Rejected Knight"	3:14
5.	"The Poor are First to Suffer and First to Help"	4:32
6.	"Dragon and Eggs Discovered"	3:49
7.	"Shared Heart" (includes Dragonheart theme)	4:13
8.	"Show Us This Dragon"	1:59
9.	"Follow Me"	1:03
10.	"First Attack"	1:21
11.	"Gareth On Fire"	2:31
12.	"Smoke Trick Rescue"	4:40
13.	"Like a Thorny Vine"	1:34
14.	"Bathing Beauty"	2:23
15.	"Shadow Hopping"	1:46
16.	"Wrong Assumptions"	0:20
17.	"Desires Can Spoil a Dream and a Heart"	2:39
18.	"A Knight is Sworn to Valor" (includes Dragonheart theme)	7:04
19.	"Honor is in Their Every Word"	0:49
20.	"Goodbye My Friend" (includes Dragonheart theme)	2:34
21.	"Clans Arrive for War"	4:31
22.	"Battle to the Death" (includes Dragonheart theme)	6:42
23.	"Final Victory & End Credits" (includes Dragonheart theme)	9:56
Total length:		76:00

=== Visual effects ===
The visual effects were done by Terminal FX.

== Release ==
Dragonheart 3: The Sorcerer's Curse was released for a Digital HD release and was released on DVD and Blu-ray in Spain, Portugal and France on February 10, 2015. It was also released in India on February 17 in English and included a Hindi audio dub track. It was released on DVD and Blu-ray in North America on February 24, which also comes with Latin Spanish and European French audio dub tracks. In the United Kingdom, it was released on DVD and Blu-ray on March 30. As of February 10, the film has been available for viewing on Netflix in the United States. A Japanese DVD and Blu-ray release was released on June 3, and it contained the original English audio with Japanese subtitles and a Japanese audio dub track.

== Reception ==
After its digital release, the film received mixed but generally positive reception, with reviews noting impressive CGI for a direct-to-video release, the film being a vast improvement over Dragonheart 2, and being on par with the original film.

It earned $2,158,271 from domestic home video sales.

== Sequels ==
The fourth film in the series, Dragonheart: Battle for the Heartfire, directed by Patrik Syversen, was released direct-to-video on June 13, 2017. The budget was reportedly double that of The Sorcerer's Curse. The fifth film in the series, Dragonheart: Vengeance, was released direct-to-video on February 4, 2020.
