= Dragonheart: Battle for the Heartfire =

2017 film by Patrik Syversen

- Directed by: Patrik Syversen
- Written by: Matthew Feitshans
- Based on: Dragonheart by Patrick Read Johnson & Charles Edward Pogue
- Produced by: Raffaella De Laurentiis
- Starring: Tom Rhys Harries; Jessamine-Bliss Bell; Patrick Stewart
- Cinematography: Andreas Johannessen
- Edited by: Charles Norris
- Music by: Mark McKenzie
- Production companies: Raffaella Productions; Castel Film Romania; Universal 1440 Entertainment
- Distributed by: Universal Pictures Home Entertainment
- Release date: June 13, 2017
- Running time: 98 minutes
- Countries: United States; Romania
- Language: English

Dragonheart: Battle for the Heartfire is a 2017 fantasy adventure film directed by Patrik Syversen. It is the second direct-to-video prequel of the 1996 film Dragonheart, and it takes place about 50 years after Dragonheart 3: The Sorcerer's Curse. It was released on Netflix, DVD, and Blu-ray on June 13, 2017.

== Plot ==
Gareth and Rhonu had a son named Walter years after becoming rulers. After Gareth spent most of his time helping Drago and Rhonu died after her bonded dragon's death, Walter became disillusioned with dragons and ran away. Years later, Walter's wife gives birth to fraternal twins with strange patches of scales on their bodies and dies; Walter raises them despite their appearances.

Twenty years later, King Gareth nears death, and succession is in doubt with Walter still missing. Gareth passes, but Drago survives, learning he is now bonded to someone else. Drago finds his heart now bound to Edric, the male twin who possesses enhanced strength and uses it as a sheriff for Earl Robert Cole's shire. Learning that Walter was Edric's father, Drago convinces Edric to take Gareth's throne in Lundenwic; despite the people loving Edric, his arrogance and inexperience with royal duties bother Drago. Realizing their bond is partial, Drago confronts Edric, who shares his twin sister Mehgan's existence. Mehgan grew up prejudiced because of her more visible scales and power to manipulate fire. After she accidentally burned down their home with Walter inside, Edric bargained to send her away by boat to protect her from the villagers. Unwilling to forsake the chance to be Robert's sheriff, he did not go with Mehgan.

Edric later learns that Vikings have invaded, and he rides out with his army to meet them. Still refusing to trust Drago, he ignores advice to let Drago fight and instead challenges the Norsemen's leader to a duel, only to find that it is Mehgan. The twins have a meeting where Drago teaches them about the Heartfire, the source of his fire breath. Mehgan demands the throne as she is the firstborn twin, but Edric refuses and ends the negotiations. Mehgan and her army sneak into the camp overnight, and she drains the Heartfire from Drago while he sleeps. The Norsemen start their attack, and Mehgan reveals her control of the Heartfire. Overwhelmed by Mehgan's power, Edric surrenders. Once Mehgan and the Vikings secure control, she banishes Edric, unaware that Thorgrim sent men after him. Edric flees to Robert's shire and requests aid in opposing Mehgan, but Robert betrays him to the Vikings, who take him aboard a boat to sell him into slavery.

While Mehgan improves women's rights in the kingdom, she tells a captive Drago what happened after Edric sent her away. After emerging the sole survivor of a storm, she drifted until running aground in Daneland, where her powers caught Thorgrim's attention. Edric tries escaping his captors but nearly sinks the boat. After locals free him from captivity, Drago rescues Edric, and they later receive aid from a theatre troupe. They reconcile as Edric reveals his guilt over his hateful last words to his father and sending Mehgan away alone. Edric learns Drago is dying without the Heartfire, so they sneak into the castle with the troupe's help. When Edric attempts to take the Heartfire from Mehgan, he sees Thorgrim's right-hand woman Sable trying to kill her. Edric's warning saves Mehgan, but their refusal to cooperate allows Sable to give Thorgrim the Heartfire, and he promptly targets the twins.

Drago saves the twins from getting captured and forces them to fight to the death for the throne; they fight and argue until Mehgan reveals what really happened when Walter died: Edric accidentally killed their father during a fight over him becoming sheriff, and she took the blame to protect his chance at a good life; the truth compels them to reconcile. Returning to the castle, Edric challenges Thorgrim to get the Heartfire while Mehgan rallies the castle's women to help her fight. Mehgan finds an open flame, but Sable and an archer mortally wound her, also affecting Drago. Thorgrim absorbs the Heartfire to control its power but gets overwhelmed. Edric kills him, scaring off the Vikings, and Mehgan recovers the remaining Heartfire. Instead of taking it back, Drago has Edric use it to heal Mehgan. Then the twins share the bond of their dragonhearts, removing their scales and powers. With Gareth's family whole again, Drago dies peacefully and becomes a new star in the Draco's tail, telling the twins to rule their kingdom together.

== Cast ==
- Patrick Stewart as Drago (voice)
- Tom Rhys Harries as Edric
- Jessamine-Bliss Bell as Mehgan
- Tamzin Merchant as Queen Rhonu
- André Eriksen as Thorgrim
- Turlough Convery as Walter
- Richard Cordery as Earl Robert Cole
- Martin Hutson as Osmund
- Delroy Brown as Councilor Marraka
- Valeriu Bazu as King Gareth
- Lewis Mackinnon as Player
- Marte Germaine Christensen as Sable
- Ørjan Gamst as Krokr
- Daniel Berge Halvorsen as Hakon
- Stig Frode Henriksen as Leiknarr
- Dina De Laurentiis as Kendra
- Edouard Philipponnat as Tomi
- Mihai Hurduc as Juggler
- Elijah Ungvary as Spaki
- Minhea Trusca as Woodsman

== Production ==
=== Development ===
After the video release of the series' third film in 2015, a sequel was later confirmed to be in development. Matthew Feitshans reprised the role as a writer on a fourth film, while Patrik Syversen was hired to direct after Colin Teague declined to return. The budget was reportedly almost twice the size of the third film's following its surprise success.

=== Filming ===
Filming began on April 12, 2016 at Corvin Castle in Hunedoara, Transylvania, Romania, and wrapped on May 6 with the rest of filming completed in late 2016. VFX company provided the CGI effects.

=== Music ===
Dragonheart: Battle for the Heartfire (Original Motion Picture Soundtrack)

Soundtrack album by Mark McKenzie
- Released: June 13, 2017
- Genre: Film score
- Length: 39:53
- Label: Back Lot Music
- Producer: Mark McKenzie

The score was composed by Mark McKenzie, who previously composed the score for Dragonheart: A New Beginning and Dragonheart 3. A source of inspiration was the musical form called Chaconne, which he used throughout the score, which McKenzie completed in six weeks. Like the previous films, it contains the original main theme from the first film by Randy Edelman. McKenzie consulted with each film's director and producer to determine where the theme should and should not play; they decided it should be used for "moments when hope and chivalry come alive through the great dragon".

All tracks are written by Mark McKenzie.

Dragonheart: Battle for the Heartfire (Original Motion Picture Soundtrack)
No.	Title	Length
1.	"Bewitched Births"	2:11
2.	"Dragonheart: Battle for the Heartfire Main Title"	0:58
3.	"Shared Love, Shared Heart" (includes Dragonheart theme)	1:32
4.	"Show Off!"	1:24
5.	"Hold Dear to Your Mother and Father"	1:38
6.	"I Knew It, I'm King!"	2:04
7.	"Love and Friendship"	1:29
8.	"Home on Fire"	1:19
9.	"Vikings Arrive"	0:52
10.	"Field Battle Challenge"	1:35
11.	"Unsettling Night"	1:27
12.	"Why Did You Leave Me?"	1:20
13.	"I Have Been Blind"	0:57
14.	"The Old Code, Honor in Every Word" (includes Dragonheart theme)	1:46
15.	"It Might Be a Blessing"	1:05
16.	"There's No Pain Like Between Those We Love Most"	2:13
17.	"Wheels are Turning"	2:17
18.	"Subversive Dance"	1:24
19.	"Truth and Love Bring Healing"	2:56
20.	"Hurry Get the Heartfire"	1:40
21.	"Ascension to the Heavens" (includes Dragonheart theme)	7:34
Total length:		39:53

== Reception ==
Common Sense Media's Brian Costello gave the film 3 out of 5 stars, calling it an entertaining medieval fantasy film and writing that its humor and brisk action helped compensate for weaker computer-generated dragon effects.

== Sequel ==
A direct-to-video sequel directed by Ivan Silvestrini, Dragonheart: Vengeance, was released in February 2020.
