= Dragonheart: Fire & Steel =

1996 action video game

- Developers: Funcom (console & PC versions); Torus Games (GB version)
- Publisher: Acclaim Entertainment
- Platforms: PlayStation, Sega Saturn, Windows, Game Boy
- Release: Game Boy: NA: May 1996; EU: October 1996; PlayStation, Saturn, PC: NA: November 13, 1996; PAL: December 1996
- Genres: Hack and slash, platform
- Mode: Single-player

Dragonheart: Fire & Steel (stylized as DragonHeart: Fire & Steel) is a video game loosely based on the 1996 fantasy adventure film Dragonheart. On most systems it is a 2D side-scrolling action game, but the Game Boy version is an adventure game with combat scenes, where adventure mode uses a first-person view and combat mode is a simple 2D fighting game.

== Plot ==
Dragonheart: Fire & Steel follows the story of medieval dragonslayer Sir Bowen as he attempts to end the reign of a particularly evil king along with seven evil dragons that have ruled the world (the seven evil dragons never appeared in the film). On the way, he befriends the last dragon to exist, Draco. Sir Bowen and Draco must join forces to defeat the army serving the king and rescue a damsel in distress. It drops out some of the film's plot, but it is still a close match.

== Reception ==
Reception for Fire & Steel

Review scores
| Publication | Score |
|---|---|
| AllGame | 1/5 (PC); 1/5 (SAT) |
| Electronic Gaming Monthly | 4.5/10 (PS1) |
| GameSpot | 2.8/10 (PS1); 3.4/10 (PC) |
| Next Generation | 1/5 (PS1) |
| Sega Saturn Magazine | 27% (SAT) |
| Manic Games | 28/100 (SAT) |

After its release, a Dragonheart spin-off was developed by Acclaim Entertainment as a 2D hack and slash game called Dragonheart: Fire & Steel for the PlayStation and Saturn. The game does not use the film's music, instead featuring an original score by Thomas Egeskov Peterson. It was met with overwhelmingly negative reviews due to simplistic gameplay, poor controls, and jerky animation. Though the graphics were praised, particularly the rendered backgrounds, critics agreed that the gameplay problems were an overriding problem. Acclaim released a PC port of the game in late 1996, which was given similar criticism.

An original Game Boy game was also based on the film, titled simply Dragonheart. The four Electronic Gaming Monthly reviewers described the Game Boy game as rather simple as well as lacking sufficient challenge, noting especially the "anticlimactic" combat, and the reviewers concluded that the game offers fair entertainment and longevity for being a portable game. The reviewers especially praised the game for its storyline, with Sushi X calling it the main reason he continued playing the game.
