= Dragonheart: Vengeance =

2020 film by Ivan Silvestrini

- Directed by: Ivan Silvestrini
- Written by: Matthew Feitshans
- Based on: Dragonheart by Patrick Read Johnson & Charles Edward Pogue
- Produced by: Raffaella De Laurentiis; Hester Hargett-Aupetit; Share Stallings
- Starring: Joseph Millson; Jack Kane; Helena Bonham Carter
- Cinematography: Matthew Weston
- Edited by: Charles Norris
- Music by: Mark McKenzie
- Production companies: Raffaella Productions; Universal 1440 Entertainment
- Distributed by: Universal Pictures Home Entertainment
- Release date: February 4, 2020
- Running time: 97 minutes
- Countries: United States; Romania
- Language: English

Dragonheart: Vengeance is a 2020 fantasy adventure film directed by Ivan Silvestrini. It is the third direct-to-video prequel of the 1996 film, Dragonheart. The film begins before the events of Dragonheart: Battle for the Heartfire, but ends after them. It was released on Netflix, DVD, and Blu-ray on February 4, 2020.

== Plot ==
In the years following Drago and Gareth's bonding, the seven dragons they raised left to different lands; one of them, a female named Siveth, traveled to Wallachia. Its monarch, King Razvan, initially welcomed her into his kingdom, but after he was wounded in battle, she refused to share her heart with him, leading to Siveth being exiled in turn. Years later, Lukas, a young farmer, sees his family being killed and his home destroyed by four raiders known as The Bear, the Wolf, The Snake, and The Scorpion. Seeking to avenge his family, Lukas travels to the kingdom to seek help from King Razvan but was turned down. A swashbuckling mercenary, Darius, offers Lukas his services to hunt the raiders, but a brawl breaks out between him and a rival group of mercenaries, forcing Lukas to flee. He later learns from a blacksmith he meets that Siveth might help him.

Encountering her in a cave, Lukas offers her a bag of crop seed. Realizing that he wants vengeance instead of justice, Siveth refuses to help, to Lukas' anger. He soon finds a horse with a saddle and supplies to aid him in his journey. Darius, who had followed him, trains Lukas to fight. While pursuing The Bear, the first of the raiders, they discover that Lukas's horse is Siveth in disguise, as she has the ability to take on the form of different animals. Darius departs after a heated argument with the dragon, leaving her and Lukas to face The Bear and his band of raiders by themselves. While trying to kill Lukas, the Bear accidentally falls off a cliff to his death.

Lukas and Siveth later subdue The Wolf, the second raider, and took him captive when he agrees to lead them to The Snake and Scorpion, but he later escapes. Despite this, The Snake was captured and Lukas learns that Siveth and Darius are bonded. As the group camps out for the night, Siveth dissuades Darius from getting Lukas to kill the Snake by revealing why she shared her heart with him: When Darius was a child, King Razvan started a war to bolster his popularity and distract people from his corrupt dealings. While returning home after being wounded in battle, he killed Darius's parents by running them off a road. Darius survives, but was left gravely injured. Siveth shared her heart with him to save him, leading to her refusal to help Razvan and her eventual exile. Darius reluctantly agrees to spare The Snake, having discovered the raiders were receiving coded messages.

After The Snake was imprisoned, Darius deciphers the messages and learns King Razvan is behind the raiders' attacks, having ordered them to kill his subjects to prevent starvation because he did not prepare for food shortages. Darius was then confronted by Razvan and his guards, who confiscate the coded orders. Meanwhile, Lukas, with Siveth's help, flirts with Oana, the town healer, whom he had met earlier. The Scorpion later frees The Snake and covers their getaway. Darius tells Siveth and Lukas of his discovery, so Siveth goes to retrieve the raiders' orders from Razvan's guards. As she tries to reclaim the evidence, Lukas and Darius pursue The Snake and Scorpion, but were ambushed. Siveth abandons her mission to save the two after seeing them in trouble through her bond with Darius. Both the Scorpion and The Snake were killed by Darius and Siveth, respectively.

Lukas expresses remorse for letting vengeance consume him while Darius and Siveth reconcile. Siveth takes Lukas to a monastery where Darius was raised. He recovers with Oana's help. Lukas and Siveth were then confronted by King Razvan and the townspeople shortly thereafter. Razvan charges Lukas with crimes he did not commit and orders Siveth to resume her exile, but she calls him out for his crimes. Darius returns with The Wolf, who reveals his part in Razvan's schemes. Realizing the king's corruption, many came forward to confess to their respective involvements, leading to Razvan being turned on and arrested alongside The Wolf.

In the time that follows, Siveth is welcomed back into society and she shares the crop seed she had saved in her ice cave. Lukas rebuilds his home, beginning a relationship with Oana. Now recognized by the kingdom for his bond with Siveth, Darius lives a happy life among the people. He reflects on Siveth's teachings, acknowledging that she showed him and Lukas the path to happiness, friendship, and love.

== Cast ==
- Joseph Millson as Darius
- Jack Kane as Lukas
- Arturo Muselli as King Razvan
- Carolina Carlsson as The Snake
- Tam Williams as The Scorpion
- Richard Ashton as The Wolf
- Ross O'Hennessy as The Bear
- Cameron Jack as Blacksmith
- Fabienne Piolini-Castle as Oana
- Helena Bonham Carter as Siveth (voice)

== Development ==
=== Production ===
Development of the script for the fifth film began directly after Battle for the Heartfire's completion.

=== Filming ===
Filming began in early November 2018 in Romania and ended on December 5. Locations include Râșnov Fortress, the volcanic crater in Racoș, and Bran Castle also in Mogoșoaia Palace. Post-production ended in September 2019.

=== Visual effects ===
The VFX company returned to do the CGI effects after working on the previous two films.

== Music ==
Dragonheart: Vengeance (Original Motion Picture Soundtrack)

Soundtrack album by Mark McKenzie
- Released: February 4, 2020
- Genre: Film score
- Length: 47:00
- Label: Back Lot Music

The score was composed by Mark McKenzie, after previously composing the score for Dragonheart: A New Beginning, The Sorcerer's Curse and Battle for the Heartfire. Like the previous films, the score includes Randy Edelman's original Dragonheart theme from the first film.

All tracks are written by Mark McKenzie.

Dragonheart: Vengeance (Original Motion Picture Soundtrack)
No.	Title	Length
1.	"Hold On To Hope in the Dark Times"	3:21
2.	"Love Changes Everything" (includes Dragonheart theme)	2:19
3.	"Never Never Ever Give Up"	1:45
4.	"You're Destined for Greatness" (includes Dragonheart theme)	2:24
5.	"You Make Me Feel Magical Inside"	1:42
6.	"Look At What You Have Left and Not at What You’ve Lost"	2:45
7.	"Pledged to Peace"	1:20
8.	"Great Love Surrounds What is Surrounding You" (includes Dragonheart theme)	2:05
9.	"Snake Battle"	2:55
10.	"Self Control Makes You Stronger"	4:48
11.	"Trying to Kiss You"	1:38
12.	"Look Behind You!"	1:22
13.	"Risking Life For Something Bigger Than Yourself"	2:07
14.	"Siveth's Cat Mouse and Dragon Plan"	4:59
15.	"Keep Looking Up" (includes Dragonheart theme)	2:29
16.	"Hope: It All Works for Good" (includes Dragonheart theme)	9:10
Total length:		47:00

== Reception ==
Common Sense Media's Brian Costello gave the film 2 out of 5 stars, criticizing it for its' violent contents and its introduction of peril.

Karina Adelgaard gave it a positive review, writing that people should watch it for what it is, saying, "In other words, don’t expect a movie in the dark and gritty style you know from Game of Thrones. This is an adventure for the whole family!"

Nick Rogers of Midwest Film Journal favorably noted that the film comes together in the end by "consolidating several strands of tension generated by the inherent risk of dragons and humans teaming up in the first place."

== Sequel ==
According to an interview with Arturo Muselli, a sixth Dragonheart film has already entered pre-production, with Matthew Feitshans returning to write the film, which is set to address questions regarding the scattered remnants of the dragon population after the events of the fifth film. As of 2026, it is currently in plot development.
