= Dragonheart: A New Beginning =

2000 film by Doug Lefler

- Release poster
- Directed by: Doug Lefler
- Written by: Shari Goodhartz
- Based on: Dragonheart by Charles Edward Pogue and Patrick Read Johnson
- Produced by: Raffaella De Laurentiis
- Starring: Robby Benson; Christopher Masterson; Harry Van Gorkum; Rona Figueroa
- Cinematography: Buzz Feitshans IV
- Edited by: John M. Taylor
- Music by: Mark McKenzie (Note: Original Dragonheart theme by Randy Edelman)
- Production company: Universal Pictures Home Entertainment
- Distributed by: Universal Studios Home Video
- Release dates: July 2000 (United Kingdom); August 8, 2000 (Canada, United States); August 12, 2000
- Running time: 84 minutes
- Countries: United States; United Kingdom; Slovakia
- Language: English
- Budget: $11,400,000

Dragonheart: A New Beginning is a 2000 fantasy action-adventure drama film directed by Doug Lefler, starring Robby Benson, Christopher Masterson, Harry Van Gorkum, and Rona Figueroa. The film is a direct-to-video sequel to the 1996 film Dragonheart.

== Plot ==
A year before his death, Sir Bowen visits the cave of his long-dead dragon friend Draco and finds an egg. (Note: As depicted in Dragonheart (1996).) He entrusts it to the monastery of his friend Brother Gilbert. Aware of a prophecy stating that "a dragon's heart could doom mankind when a two-tailed comet blazed across the night sky", the friars pledge to hide the dragon until the comet passes, with Friar Peter protecting and teaching him for 20 years. The dragon's care soon falls upon a young and grumpy monk named Mansel.

Geoff, an orphaned stable boy who dreams of becoming a knight like Bowen, lives at the monastery doing menial chores. Meanwhile, the king makes a man named Osric his chief adviser. Osric pledges to ensure the Old Code continues but secretly corrupts it while poisoning the king's mind, plotting to take the throne. His first act was passing out tunics to everyone with colors representing their station, warning of punishment for not wearing them. Two Chinese citizens from the Hebei, Master Kwan and his son, enter the kingdom and ask Friar Peter if he knows anything about dragons. According to the stars, a new dragon was born, and the comet arrives in eight days; they want to prevent the prophecy and confirm if the dragon has a pure heart. Geoff tricks Mansel into doing manual labor and finds the hidden dragon, Drake. Geoff is initially afraid but realizes Drake is equally scared, and they become fast friends. Friar Peter dies suddenly the following day, and Drake goes outside for the first time.

Four days before the comet, the two Chinese learn of Drake's existence. Some knights surprise Geoff, and he discovers the Chinese son is actually a woman named Lian, China's empress in disguise. The knights threaten Geoff whom they caught without his tunic, forcing Drake to take his first flight to rescue him, revealing himself to the kingdom. Osric names Geoff and Drake as the kingdom's protectors against the invading Teregoths and takes Geoff under his wing. After testing Drake's purity, Master Kwan begins teaching him to use his dragon abilities, including exhaling ice breath, a rare skill that few dragons master. Lian reveals to Geoff that a rogue dragon, Griffin, betrayed the dragon's honor code and led a rebellion until virtuous dragons captured him and took his heart, placing it in an amulet. Fearing that all dragons were like Griffin, the Chinese emperor Kuo-fan ordered all Eastern dragons killed, so Drake is now the world's last dragon.

On the prophesied day, Kwan and Lian are captured and jailed. Osric takes Geoff and Drake to battle a group of Teregoths at a border house. Osric fakes a fatal blow and asks Drake to give him half his heart, but Geoff realizes the deception and stops Drake. Osric tries holding Geoff hostage but fails. Drake rallies an escape and masters firebreathing to save Geoff. Kwan, Lian, and Mansel escape the castle dungeon, heal the king, and confront Osric, who recognizes Lian and the amulet. Kwan discerns Osric's true identity and orders the amulet burned. Osric recovers and throws a knife at Lian to punish her for her ancestor's sins, but Kwan intervenes and dies.

Geoff and Drake arrive as Osric claims to have exposed the Old Code's true meaning as a way to control the weak. Osric reveals one dragon escaped Bowen's wrath, fled to the East, and sought revenge before the noble dragons stopped him and cursed him to live as a human as punishment. He cuts his chest open with Lian's knife and takes the heart as the comet appears, revealing himself as Griffin and making Lian realize the prophecy was about him. Resuming his dragon form, Griffin asks Drake to join him in humanity's conquest. Recalling how Griffin would've cost him his soul hadn't Geoff intervened, Drake refuses and challenges Griffin. After a short but fierce fight between the dragons, Drake masters ice breath and freezes Griffin to death, causing Griffin's corpse to fall and shatter before the comet passes.

One of the ice shards stabs and kills Geoff, so Drake offers part of his heart, reviving Geoff. The Old Code is restored; Lian returns to her royal duties for a time; and Mansel is awarded guardianship of Brother Gilbert's scrolls, finally gaining the desired life of prayer and devotion. Geoff and Drake become brothers, finally getting the family they both wanted.

== Cast ==
- Christopher Masterson as Geoffrey, a stableboy with dreams of being a knight who befriended a dragon
- Robby Benson as the voice of Drake, the last known dragon who was hidden in the monastery
- Harry Van Gorkum as Lord Osric of Crosley, a corrupt knight and chief advisor plotting to dethrone the king who is later revealed to be the evil dragon named Griffin. Gorkum provides the voice of Griffin.
  - Gorkum also portrays Sir Bowen, a Knight of the Old Code and protagonist of the first film. He was previously portrayed by Dennis Quaid from the first film.
- Rona Figueroa as Lian, the empress of China masquerading as Kwan's son
- Henry O as Master Kwan, an elderly monk from China searching for the dragon
- Matt Hickey as Novice Monk Mansel, a young monk who is also the narrator
  - Anthony O'Donnell as the voice of older Mansel
- John Woodnutt as Friar Peter, the Elder monk
- Ken Shorter as The King
- Tom Burke as Roland
- Lubomir Misak as Lubo
- Karin Haydu as King's attendant
- Peter Hric as Sir Stefan, Osric's henchman
- Imrich Strunar as Miller
- Gustáv Kyselica as Cowherd
- Vladimir Oktavec as Abbott
- Vlado Durdík as the old Man
- Stano Satko as one of squires
- Roman Jankovic as one of squires
- Peter Olgyay as one of squires
- Vladimir Furdik as Sentry

== Production ==
=== Music ===
Dragonheart: A New Beginning (Original Motion Picture Soundtrack)

Soundtrack album by Mark McKenzie
- Released: August 15, 2000
- Genre: Film score
- Length: 39:34
- Label: Universal Studios
- Producer: Mark McKenzie

Mark McKenzie composed the score with orchestrations done by him, Patrick Russ, and Warren Sherk. At producer De Laurentiis's request, McKenzie incorporated Randy Edelman's Dragonheart theme from the first film in some tracks; using it as a guideline, McKenzie wrote themes that would easily transition with it.

All tracks are written by Mark McKenzie.

Dragonheart: A New Beginning (Original Motion Picture Soundtrack)
No.	Title	Length
1.	"Dragonheart: A New Beginning, Main Titles" (includes Dragonheart theme)	4:52
2.	"I'm Flying?!"	2:20
3.	"Knighthood and the Old Code"	2:00
4.	"Friar Peter Went to Heaven" (includes Dragonheart theme)	1:32
5.	"Lian's Awesome Fight"	1:37
6.	"My Heart Goes With You - Instrumental"	2:19
7.	"Dungeons, Skeletons, and a Dragon"	3:45
8.	"Serenade to the Stars"	1:06
9.	"Dragon Heaven" (includes Dragonheart theme)	1:21
10.	"Roland Bullies Geoff"	1:25
11.	"Renaissance Banquet"	1:28
12.	"Chinese Battle the Knights"	2:14
13.	"Withered Heart Tale"	0:56
14.	"Tai Chee"	0:49
15.	"Terragoth Ambush!"	2:14
16.	"Prophetic Transformation"	1:24
17.	"Dragon Fight!"	1:28
18.	"My Wise Master and Closest Friend"	1:32
19.	"Of My Heart to Thee I Give" (includes Dragonheart theme)	1:43
20.	"My Heart Goes With You" (performed by Rona Figueroa)	3:19
Total length:		39:34

== Reception ==
The film-critic aggregator Rotten Tomatoes reports 40% positive reviews, based on five critics.

=== Accolades ===
Award	Category	Recipients	Result
Video Premiere Award	Best Supporting Actor	Harry Van Gorkum	Nominated
Video Premiere Award	Best Original Score	Mark McKenzie	Nominated
Video Premiere Award	Best Art Direction	Bruno Vilela	Nominated
Video Premiere Award	Best Visual Effects	Melissa Taylor; Ron Simonson; Dobbie Schiff; Jason Armstrong; Fish Essenfeld; Bruno Vilela; Tim Lannon	Nominated
Video Premiere Award	Best Sound	Stefan Henrix	Nominated
Writers Guild of America	Children's Script	Shari Goodhartz	Nominated

== Prequels ==
A third Dragonheart was in development since 2014. Dragonheart 3: The Sorcerer's Curse is a prequel taking place years before the 1996 film, focusing on the idea of the dragon race being rejuvenated from its brink-of-extinction state. The film was released as a direct-to-DVD/Blu-ray format in February 2015 in North America. Raffaella De Laurentiis reprised the role as the producer, while Colin Teague directed the film. The second and third prequels, Dragonheart: Battle for the Heartfire and Dragonheart: Vengeance, were released in 2017 and 2020, respectively.
