= Dragonheart =

1996 film by Rob Cohen

- Theatrical release poster
- Directed by: Rob Cohen
- Screenplay by: Charles Edward Pogue
- Story by: Charles Edward Pogue; Patrick Read Johnson
- Produced by: Raffaella De Laurentiis
- Starring: Dennis Quaid; David Thewlis; Pete Postlethwaite; Dina Meyer; Julie Christie; Sean Connery
- Cinematography: David Eggby
- Edited by: Peter Amundson
- Music by: Randy Edelman
- Production company: Raffaella Productions
- Distributed by: Universal Pictures
- Release dates: May 31, 1996 (United States); October 18, 1996 (United Kingdom)
- Running time: 103 minutes
- Country: United States
- Language: English
- Budget: $57 million
- Box office: $115.3 million

Dragonheart (stylized as DragonHeart) is a 1996 American fantasy adventure film directed by Rob Cohen and written by Charles Edward Pogue, based on a story created by him and Patrick Read Johnson. The film stars Dennis Quaid, David Thewlis, Pete Postlethwaite, Dina Meyer, and Sean Connery as the voice of Draco the Dragon.

It was nominated for the Academy Award for Best Visual Effects and various other awards in 1996 and 1997. The film received mixed reviews, with critics praising the premise, visual effects, and character development but panning the script as confusing and clichéd. It was a box-office success, earning $115 million worldwide. It was dedicated to the memory of Steve Price and Irwin Cohen.

== Plot ==
In 984 A.D., the knight Sir Bowen mentors Saxon Prince Einon in the Old Code, hoping that the boy will grow up as a chivalrous, intelligent, and just ruler. While suppressing a peasant rebellion, Einon's father, King Freyne, is killed by the rebels, and peasant girl Kara accidentally wounds Einon's heart. Einon's Celtic mother, Queen Aislinn, asks a dragon to save his life. The dragon makes Einon swear to be a just ruler and replaces Einon's wounded heart with half of his own. Einon, however, proves to be even more cruel than his tyrannical father, enslaving the former rebels that killed Freyne and forcing them to rebuild a castle. Einon also has Kara's father, who led the insurgents, blinded. Believing that the dragon's heart has corrupted Einon, Bowen swears vengeance on him, and all dragons, by hunting them down.

Twelve years later, Bowen has become a skilled dragonslayer, but has lost his faith in moral and chivalric principles as he has hunted dragons nearly to extinction. Monk Brother Gilbert witnesses Bowen's prowess and follows him to record his exploits. Meanwhile, Kara asks Einon to free her father after years of slavery; Einon accepts, and kills him in order to "free" him.

Bowen stalks a dragon to its cave, not knowing that it is the one who saved Einon. The confrontation ends in a stalemate, during which the dragon states that he is the last of his kind; they agree not to kill each other and instead form a partnership to defraud villagers with staged dragon "slayings". Bowen later names the dragon after the Draco constellation, unaware of Draco and Einon's connection, through which they feel each other's pain.

Kara, seeking revenge on Einon, is imprisoned after a failed assassination attempt. Recognizing her as the girl he saw while dying, Einon tries seducing Kara and making her his queen. Despising what Einon has become, Aislinn helps Kara escape the castle. Kara tries to rally her village against Einon, but they sacrifice her to Draco instead. After Draco takes Kara to his lair, Einon arrives to recapture her and fights Bowen. During the confrontation, Einon reveals his contempt for Bowen and his beliefs, forcing Bowen to accept that Einon was always evil, even before he received the dragon's heart. He nearly kills Bowen, but Draco intervenes and reveals his half-heart to Einon, making him flee in fear. Kara asks Bowen to help overthrow Einon, but the disillusioned knight refuses.

Bowen reunites with Gilbert at another village while Kara tries exposing Bowen and Draco, appalled by their actions. The villagers do not believe her until after the staged slaying while Draco plays dead. He bolts when the villagers decide to carve him up for meat, revealing the scam. They then surround Bowen, Kara, and Gilbert, wanting to eat them instead; Draco rescues the trio and takes them to Avalon, where they take shelter among the tombs of King Arthur and the Knights of the Round Table.

Draco reveals that he hoped to change Einon's nature by saving him, reuniting the races of Man and Dragon, and earning a place in the constellation—the Dragon's Heaven. Draco fears that his choice has cost him his soul, and that his spirit is doomed to disappear upon death like he never existed. After hearing that Kara and even Gilbert intend to oppose Einon, Draco agrees to help. When a vision of Arthur reminds him of his knightly honor, Bowen also agrees.

Bowen, Kara, Gilbert, and Draco organize and train the villagers into an army. They are nearly victorious against Einon's forces when Gilbert strikes Einon in the heart with an arrow, but Draco, feeling Einon's pain, falls from the sky and is captured. Realizing that he is immortal as long as Draco lives, Einon is determined to keep Draco imprisoned. Knowing their connection, Aislinn attempts to kill Draco at his request, but Einon intercepts and kills her.

The rebels invade Einon's castle to save Draco. Bowen throws Einon from atop a tower in the ensuing fight. He then tries freeing Draco, who begs Bowen to kill him and end Einon's reign. Einon rises and charges towards them, forcing a reluctant Bowen to throw an axe into Draco's exposed half-heart, killing him and Einon.

Draco's body dissipates as his soul joins his fellow dragons to become a new star in the constellation. Bowen and Kara go on to lead the kingdom into an era of justice and peace, with Draco's star shining brighter than ever in troubled times.

== Cast ==
- Dennis Quaid as Sir Bowen, a knight who becomes a dragonslayer and then allies with Draco. Director Rob Cohen was impressed with Quaid, telling producer Raffaella De Laurentiis "[Quaid] is a knight of the old code". Cohen called Quaid "obviously intelligent and fun to work with" and said that he "really [thought] he was Bowen". Quaid underwent rigorous training for the role, mostly practicing sword fighting. Quaid and Cohen both wanted Bowen's sword technique to have an "Eastern flavor", so Quaid trained with Japanese sword master Kiyoshi Yamasaki.
- Sean Connery as the voice of Draco, the last remaining dragon. Cohen felt it was "very important that [the dragon's] personality be derived from the actor who was going to play the voice" and said that Connery was the only actor he had in mind for the role. He described Connery's voice as "unique" and "instantly recognizable", but said that it was "what [Connery] stood for in life as an actor and as a man that most related to what I wanted for Draco". Connery did the voice recording for Draco in three sessions. To help animate Draco's facial expressions, Cohen and the ILM animators took close-up shots of Connery from his previous films, categorized the clips according to what emotion he was expressing, and put them in separate tapes for easy reference.
- David Thewlis as King Einon, a tyrant who shares part of Draco's heart. Cohen cast Thewlis based on his performance in Naked, stating, "what makes a villain scary is the brain, not the brawn".
  - Lee Oakes as young Einon
- Dina Meyer as Kara, a peasant girl who seeks revenge on Einon for killing her father. Meyer was the second actress Cohen interviewed for the role. Cohen said that he needed an actress who was "strong and someone who could, in the end, handle herself with these double viking axes and look believable". Sandra Kovacikova plays Kara as a child.
- Pete Postlethwaite as Brother Gilbert of Glockenspur, a monk and aspiring poet who joins Bowen and Draco in the revolt against Einon. Cohen wanted Postlethwaite for the role based on his performance in In the Name of the Father, feeling that "anyone who was assured in a dramatic role could take Brother Gilbert and make it real and charmingly funny".
- Jason Isaacs as Lord Felton, Einon's second in command. He hires Bowen to slay a dragon running rampant around his village but refuses to pay after learning more of Bowen.
- Julie Christie as Queen Aislinn, Einon's mother. Cohen found Christie through David Thewlis' casting agent.
- Peter Hric as King Freyne, Einon's father and Aislinn's husband.
- Brian Thompson as Brok, Einon's knight who served alongside Einon's father when he was king.
- Terry O'Neill as Redbeard, Kara's father.
- Wolf Christian as Hewe, a one-eyed villager who is part of the peasant rebellion.
- John Gielgud as the uncredited voice of King Arthur, who speaks to Bowen during his visit to Avalon.

== Production ==
=== Writing ===
In 1988, Patrick Read Johnson came up with the idea for Dragonheart and pitched it to producer Raffaella De Laurentiis a year later. Johnson proposed the film's concept to De Laurentiis, describing it as "The Skin Game with a dragon in it...or Butch Cassidy and the Sundance Dragon". He wanted "the idea of a dragon and a knight conning villages for money" because he thought the concept was "not only funny, but kind of sweet". According to Johnson, before the film was ever called Dragonheart and had the element of the shared heart, it began with the premise of

...the last dragon and the last knight that finally meet up in a stalemate and make a deal. This was sort of the first scene that I thought of with the knight in the dragon's mouth with his sword against the roof his mouth. I knew they would come to the conclusion that the only way for them to continue to survive was to stage these mock battles all over the countryside and get paid in heaps of gold.

Johnson's manager Melinda Jason also managed screenplay writer Charles Edward Pogue, who previously wrote for David Cronenberg's remake of The Fly and was working on adapting A Princess of Mars for Disney. When meeting for drinks in Bora Bora, Johnson pitched the idea for Dragonheart to Pogue, and he agreed to work on the film. Johnson already had the story's beginning and end in mind but not much of the middle, so he and Pogue collaborated on the script, developing the characters and the Old Code while working the Arthurian myth into the story. Pogue described the story's themes as "a disillusioned man's struggle to recapture his idealism" and "the attempt to maintain one's passion in the cesspool of the world". Creating the backstory of the dragon culture and spiritual afterlife proved challenging for Pogue; he had to think of Draco's motivations and why he clings to life rather than letting Bowen kill him and end his despair. Pogue solved the issue by making Draco fear going to Hell without a soul for sharing his heart with Einon. Then Bowen re-enters Draco's life, and he sees hope and a chance for redemption through Bowen, with Draco unaware that the fateful decision he's been avoiding for years is now closer than he knows. According to Pogue, the screenplay for Dragonheart is among his best work, and it moved countless people to tears; he completed the first draft in only two months. After he, Johnson, and De Laurentiis made revisions, Pogue finished the script in 1990. They submitted it to Universal Pictures on a Friday. Two days later, on Monday morning, Universal gave Johnson the green light to start making the film as the script produced a strong emotional response from studio executives.

=== Casting ===
During his time location scouting in Spain, Johnson created the character of Draco. He and Pogue shaped it for Sean Connery, a client of Creative Artists Agency (CAA) at the time, who was Johnson's only choice in mind to voice Draco. Johnson wanted to "animalize" Connery's voice by giving it "deep resounding rumbles, and make the vocabulary such that it didn't sound quite human". Instead of how it is heard in the final film, "it wasn't just gonna be Sean Connery's voice coming out of the dragon".

After completing location scouting, CAA sent numerous English and Irish actors to meet with Johnson for the Bowen role, including Gabriel Byrne, Timothy Dalton, and Pierce Brosnan. English actresses sent for the part of Kara included Elizabeth Hurley and Patsy Kensit. Johnson then met the then-up-and-coming Liam Neeson, and the two hit it off, with Johnson noting how Neeson could be both brooding and funny, but much to Johnson's chagrin, the studio refused to believe Neeson could pull off the action hero role since he had just completed Darkman. Wanting a big-name lead actor for the film, Universal sent the script to actors like Tom Hanks, Kevin Bacon, and Arnold Schwarzenegger as potential Bowen candidates. The studio even suggested that Whoopi Goldberg voice Draco instead of Connery. Other actors considered to replace Neeson included Harrison Ford, Mel Gibson, and Patrick Swayze, Cohen's first choice for Bowen before Dennis Quaid accepted the role. With the castings of Quaid as Bowen and Meyer as Kara, Johnson said:

...I love Dennis Quaid; I love everything he's done. I just didn't think he should be in 10th century England, any more than Kevin Costner should be in Sherwood Forest. Not that they weren't enjoyable in their roles. Frankly, I think Dennis Quaid saved the movie, as much as it could have been saved...Dennis Quaid just wasn't the right man for the role; Liam Neeson was the right man for the role... And Dina Meyer...again...10th century England?! Beverly Hills 10 A.D.? Bless her heart, she tried. It didn't help that they stuck her in that funny red wig that was constantly changing shape and size. The whole thing just flabbergasted me.

Johnson also claimed that Cohen shooting the scenes with Lee Oakes as young Einon first greatly hindered David Thewlis's performance; Oakes spoke with a thick Northern English accent, forcing Thewlis to mimic the child actor's accent.

=== Production ===
After Universal approved the screenplay and gave the go-ahead on the film, Johnson and De Laurentiis scouted Spain for filming locations. Johnson described Dragonheart as a phenomenon that took off in Hollywood since it was "a movie that everybody wanted to be in, and everybody wanted to score, and everybody wanted to be the cinematographer of, and everybody wanted to direct". For a campfire scene test, Johnson had the then-unknown Clive Owen fill in for Liam Neeson as Bowen opposite an animatronic Draco made by Jim Henson's Creature Shop.

As the Creature Shop did tests for Draco, Industrial Light & Magic (ILM) did CGI tests for Jurassic Park. Universal believed waiting would be better as the CGI technology could benefit Dragonheart. Additionally, according to Johnson, Universal saw the Creature Shop test footage as the pretext for the final film's quality. The studio went behind his back, trying to remove him from the project and give it to an A-list director since Johnson only had one film to his name at the time. Raffaella De Laurentiis tried to negotiate the budget to one the studio would accept at around $21 million. Still, Universal would not take an amount lower than $23 million and would ironically end up spending roughly triple the amount on the film. When Universal ended his contract, Johnson was only paid and given credit for writing the story and acting as executive producer. For his desired direction for the film, Johnson said:

...I wanted this to be a more noble film than it ended up being. I still wanted it to be fun, and I wanted it to be charming and clever. I wanted it to have a more European feeling. Like something Terry Gilliam might do.

Then Richard Donner was approached as Universal sought a replacement director. Donner spent roughly six months working on the film before moving on to other projects. The studio declined Kenneth Branagh after deciding the amount he asked to star in and direct the film was too expensive. De Laurentiis hoped to make John Badham, Rob Cohen's then-partner, interested in handling Dragonheart and sent him the script; according to Cohen, Badham "didn't respond" to the material. After working with De Laurentiis on Dragon: The Bruce Lee Story in 1993, Rob Cohen agreed to take over as director, and Universal announced his attachment to the film in January 1994.

=== Creative direction ===
Since Jurassic Park was released and Universal Studios sought to have Draco made with CGI like the dinosaurs, there had to be script alterations per Draco's allowed screen time based on the film's budget. As a result, Draco would appear less often than in the original script, which included a sequence with Bowen flying around on Draco's back.

According to Pogue, the film production became troublesome after Rob Cohen's hiring; Pogue felt Cohen "had neither the poetry in his soul nor the panache to bring Dragonheart to the screen". One of Cohen's first changes to the film was setting it during the 10th century Dark Ages rather than the sophisticated "Robin Hood-era" 12th century Middle Ages. He felt the possibility of dragons existing during the mostly unrecorded period would be more believable and appropriate for his grittier vision. While streamlining the script with Pogue, they removed one of Bowen and Draco's scams as Cohen felt that doing three would be too expensive and reduced the number of battles. Other changes to the script under Cohen's direction include:

- Reducing Queen Aislinn to "a glorified bit player".
- Changing the unseen old scarred dragon from male to female.
- Cutting a scene between Gilbert and Bowen by a riverbank where they discuss their goals and motivations.

Also removed were scenes showing the developing love story between Bowen and Kara, which the final film only alludes to without proper resolution. For example, Kara and Bowen declare their love for each other, during which Bowen asks Kara for her "lady's favor". Kara reveals Einon raped her and therefore has nothing to give Bowen, so Bowen kneels and gives her a chaste kiss on the hand. Cohen reportedly removed the scene because he felt Kara should be more of an action-oriented character swinging axes around and did not believe she would make "sappy speeches". Pogue however said that Cohen cut the scene because he could not get the desired performance, which involved having Kara and Bowen in an intimate embrace instead of the hand kiss, and conflicted with Dina Meyer. This issue also made Cohen cut a scene with the peasant army gifting Bowen a suit of armor they make for him, overwhelming Bowen with emotion, which Pogue considered Dennis Quaid's best scene. Then Cohen's desire to showcase Draco as the film's main attraction caused the deletion of vital "connective tissue" scenes, making the film feel inconsistent and rushed. Pogue also said the film suffered because Universal aimed to turn Dragonheart into a kids' movie as the dark and weighty elements were either removed or dumbed down. As Johnson said: "They messed with the script and started adding things like, 'Ready or not here I come! It's Draco!' I mean, we never had that stuff in our script! All this cheesy crap that just juvenilized the picture".

Another change Cohen made to the script that was a bone of contention to Pogue was the lack of logic in adding the pigs to the swamp village scene. In Johnson's words:

Critical elements were missing, things were replaced, and there was all this silly stuff. Like this village that's surrounded by 10 million pigs, but all the people are starving, and yelling out, "We're starving! We need meat! Let's kill the dragon", but they're surrounded by pigs! So, I'm trying to find the logic here. I just didn't get that.

Pogue explains that Draco uses the scams he and Bowen do to "pick at Bowen's conscience and test his morality". Each village they go to is more poverty-stricken than the last. This point would come to a head and serve Bowen's character arc in the swamp village; its people are beyond impoverished, and Bowen feels he can no longer justify the scams as a way to be a thorn in Einon's side. When Cohen added the pigs to the scene, Pogue told De Laurentiis it would make everyone look stupid since the villagers were supposed to be starving. They are trying to eat a seemingly dead Draco for an easy meal before turning on Bowen, Kara, and Gilbert for being the victims of a cruel joke, yet the pigs surrounding the villagers would have sustained them. Pogue and De Laurentiis brought the illogical nature of adding the pigs to Cohen's attention, but he forcibly dismissed their concerns. The pigs stayed in the film, and the elements that would serve Bowen's arc became pointless.

According to Johnson, the script changes also damaged Einon; Johnson envisioned Kenneth Branagh or a similar actor in the role as a quiet and confident villain with a sense of unpredictability who would go crazy upon realizing his and Draco's fates are connected. To Johnson, the script revisions turned Einon into a continuously shouting brat and a character stripped of potential development.

This was a guy who had been given immortality. He knows it, or at least believes it. He's been saved by a dragon; he's blessed, and unstoppable. An unstoppable guy doesn't go around raging, he's supremely confident and quiet. He kills with a whisper, and not with a scream. My idea was Kenneth Branagh, or someone of that ilk. They made Einon into this character who had nowhere to go. Throughout the whole first act of the movie was just screaming and yelling and throwing things around! He was just being a whiny brat. Where do you go from there? You can't get bigger, and you can't get smaller because the movie is supposed to build. My idea was for him to just be so quiet and you just wouldn't know what he was going to do next. He had half of a dragon's heart inside of him. And it isn't until you see this dragon return to come for him, and he realizes that if the dragon dies he's dead, that he really begins to panic, and then he starts to go crazy. That's what you want, but you don't start there!

In the "Making of Dragonheart" featurette on DVD, Cohen says he was aware of the project for years before getting the directing job and that Johnson was merely involved with the script. Johnson said that he harbored no ill will for Cohen taking over the project, but that changed when he "started hearing the horror stories about how Chuck Pogue was being treated, and then I started seeing Rob taking credit for things that weren't his to take credit for". Cohen also took credit for Draco's design and Sean Connery being Draco's voice actor. Johnson cites an article from Cinescape magazine, "where Rob is again asked about the origin of the project and he basically tries to sell the idea that I was some film student that somehow got attached to this great project that somehow pre-existed my involvement".

=== Dragon design and animation ===
After leaving Alien 3, sculptor Gary Pollard supervised and sculpted the first Draco design, a dragon with a long snout and a crown of feather-like horns. To stay within the budget Universal was willing to shell out with Johnson directing, the developers approached Jim Henson's Creature Shop to create the Draco through traditional means. The dragon model was done within eight weeks, including a quarter-scale puppet and a full-size head that could speak with real-time lip sync through camera speed manipulation. Then the crew went to Shepperton Studios in England to begin shooting the film, starting with the campfire scene. The team faced difficulties in keeping within the budget. The test didn't convince Universal that Draco could have enough dynamic movement.

After Jurassic Park's theatrical release, the CG dinosaurs convinced De Laurentiis to bring Draco to life with CGI. Universal hired several effects companies to do Draco animation tests. Due to time constraints, ILM did a screen test for Dragonheart using a "stretched out" version of the Tyrannosaurus from Jurassic Park. The test impressed Universal, so they attached ILM to the film in May 1994.

Rob Cohen hired Phil Tippett, a visual effects producer specializing in creature design and character animation, to animate Draco for Dragonheart. Tippett states that his studio's responsibilities for Dragonheart differed from what they did for Jurassic Park since Draco would have more screen time (23 minutes for Draco instead of six and a half for the dinosaurs). They were primarily responsible for Draco's actual look and design, storyboards, blocking, and action sequence timing. Tippett worked closely with sculptor Peter Konig in designing Draco. Konig crafted between 20 and 30 maquettes before Cohen approved the final design. Konig improved the ones Cohen said "[felt] right", adding forearms as Cohen wanted Draco to use his hands. Cohen's ideas for Draco's design stemmed from the traditional Chinese guardian lion, which Cohen describes as having "a lion-like elegance, a fierceness", and that it is "ultimately a proud...visually powerful creature". As Draco had to emote, Tippett infused human features into Draco's face to make it mammalian rather than reptilian; his muzzle was designed to be a mixture of a highland gorilla and a human mouth to accommodate his dialogue. Draco's face was designed to resemble Sean Connery's after his casting. Cohen also drew ideas from nature, such as the boa constrictor's jaw structure, horses' musculature, and retractable teeth. Tippett also considered how Cohen would frame the scenes involving Draco, the size difference between Draco and the human actors, and what he would do throughout the film. Tippett and his crew created a five-foot model of Draco for lighting reference and an articulated model used as a reference for Draco's poses.

It took five months for four modelers to make Draco's digital model with ILM's Alias software. Originally, Draco's scales and wings would have an iridescent quality; it is visible in some scenes but mostly not. His wingspan was initially calculated as 125 ft to support his body but halved to 72 ft to be practical enough to fit on the sets. His eyes were also more detailed and dilated. Those were some of the design elements dropped because of software issues, running out of time, and wanting to make Draco as realistic as possible and not too fantastical. To aid animators so that Draco's performance resembled Connery as much as possible, Cohen made an extensive library of reference footage with hundreds of Connery images from his filmography up to that point, categorized by his displayed emotion.

Dragonheart is the first film to use ILM's Caricature software, developed to help lip-sync Draco's animation to Sean Connery's voiceover work; programmer Cary Phillips received the Academy Scientific and Technical Achievement Award for creating the software. The film is notable for having the first realistic CG dragon in film, and Draco is the first dragon ILM made capable of human speech.

=== Filming ===
Pre-production on Dragonheart began on January 17, 1994, while principal photography began that July in Slovakia, scheduled to end in November. During sequences with Draco and Bowen, visual effects supervisor Scott Squires and his teams used what they called a "monster stick"—a pole with a bar and two red circles at the top—as an indicator for where Draco's eyes would be for Quaid's reference. They also set up speakers through which Cohen would read Draco's lines for Quaid, which Quaid said that it "helped [him] out a lot".

While filming the scenes involving Draco in flight, the crew used a microlight for reference and edited the footage to "put Draco over the top of that and remove any traces of the aircraft".

Although Draco is fully CGI-rendered, some scenes use full-sized models of some of his body parts. One of them was Draco's foot, used to pin Bowen to the ground, and the other was Draco's jaw during the scene where Bowen gets trapped inside it. While the foot was a non-moving prop, the jaw had moving parts, and a puppeteer operated it.

In January 1995, editor Peter Amundsen delivered the film's first cut to Cohen with a length of 2 hours and 18 minutes. After going through the reels, they shortened the film to two hours and seven minutes. In mid-March, they completed the final cut with 182 CG shots. According to Cohen, they spent an additional 13 months working on the film after making the final cut. He was in Rome to shoot Daylight on-location during this period and had to review animation sequences with ILM, giving them his comments and instructions through a satellite hookup.

=== Music ===
Dragonheart (Original Motion Picture Soundtrack)

Soundtrack album by Randy Edelman
- Released: May 31, 1996
- Genre: Film score
- Length: 45:58
- Label: Geffen Records

After reading the script, Jerry Goldsmith personally requested Johnson to let him score Dragonheart when Johnson was set to direct the film. Goldsmith never got to write any music for the film as things fell through during production, and he left the project when Universal let Johnson go.

Randy Edelman composed the score, beginning in the late fall of 1995 and finishing by the start of 1996. The main theme song, "The World of the Heart", and its companion track, "To the Stars", were used in many film trailers such as Two Brothers, Mulan, Anna and the King, Dragonheart: A New Beginning, The Young Black Stallion, and Seven Years in Tibet, among others. Clip montages at the Academy Awards feature the Dragonheart theme, as do the closing credits of the U.S. broadcasts of the Olympic Games, making it a well-known film score. MCA Records released the film's soundtrack album on May 28, 1996, containing 15 music tracks.

All tracks are written by Randy Edelman.

Dragonheart (Original Motion Picture Soundtrack)
No.	Title	Length
1.	"The World of the Heart - Main Title" (includes the Dragonheart theme)	3:19
2.	"To The Stars" (includes Dragonheart theme)	3:14
3.	"Wonders of an Ancient Glory" (includes Dragonheart theme)	2:22
4.	"Einon"	3:53
5.	"The Last Dragon Slayer"	4:01
6.	"Bowen's Ride"	2:35
7.	"Mexican Standoff"	2:21
8.	"Draco" (includes Dragonheart theme)	1:15
9.	"A Refreshing Swim"	1:26
10.	"Re-Baptism"	2:48
11.	"Bowen's Decoy"	3:23
12.	"Kyle, The Wheat Boy"	4:25
13.	"The Connection"	2:26
14.	"Flight to Avalon"	2:55
15.	"Finale" (includes Dragonheart theme)	5:30
Total length:		45:58

== Release ==
=== Box office ===
Released on May 31, 1996, Dragonheart collected $15 million during its opening weekend, ranking in third place at the box office behind Twister and Mission: Impossible. The film grossed $115 million against the budget of $57 million.

=== Home media ===
Dragonheart was released on VHS on November 19, 1996, and on DVD as a "Collector's Edition" on March 31, 1998. A THX certified widescreen VHS version would debut on September 9, 1997. The film was later released on HD DVD on May 29, 2007. Dragonheart and Dragonheart: A New Beginning were released on a one-disc print known as "2 Legendary Tales" on March 2, 2004. Dragonheart was released on Blu-ray disc on March 27, 2012. Shout! Factory released the film in 4K on Blu-ray on February 28, 2023.

=== Merchandising and marketing ===
The film's first official trailer featured Enya's song "Pax Deorum" from her album The Memory of Trees.

Kenner released a toy line based on the main characters and additional dragons that were not shown or mentioned in the film. Revell (under their Promodeler line) produced and released only 5000 units of a limited edition vinyl model kit of Draco and Bowen, sculpted by John Dennett. In 1996, Topps released trading cards for the film, and the comics division published a two-issue comic adaptation.

== Other media ==
=== Novelization ===
The first edition cover of Pogue's Dragonheart novelization

Charles Edward Pogue wrote a 262-page novelization, Dragonheart, published by Berkley Books in June 1996. The first edition shows Pogue as the sole author, but the book is frequently listed with Johnson as co-author.

Based on his original screenplay, with "several new inspirations that weren't in any of the various drafts", it is faithful to his vision of Dragonheart as the transcendent film it should have been. It was released in several languages and five editions in the U.S. to widespread critical acclaim. Readers praised Pogue's writing and how the book develops the story, setting, and characters more than the film, noting its darker and more serious tone than the film's.

In 1999, Adriana Gabriel adapted the film into a junior novelization.

=== Video game ===
After its release, Dragonheart spawned a spin-off 2D hack and slash game for the PlayStation, Saturn, PC, and Game Boy called Dragonheart: Fire & Steel, made by Acclaim Entertainment.

== Reception ==
Based on reviews from 30 critics compiled retrospectively, Rotten Tomatoes gives the film a score of 47%. The site's consensus states: "Dragonheart gives us medieval action, a splendidly mulleted Dennis Quaid, and Sean Connery as a talking dragon -- and, unfortunately, a story that largely fails to engage". On Metacritic — which assigns a weighted mean score — the film has a score of 49 out of 100 based on 27 critics, indicating "mixed or average" reviews. Audiences polled by CinemaScore gave the film an average grade of "B+" on an A+ to F scale.

Roger Ebert gave the film three out of four stars: "While no reasonable person over the age of 12 would presumably be able to take it seriously, it nevertheless has a lighthearted joy, a cheerfulness, an insouciance, that recalls the days when movies were content to be fun. Add that to the impressive technical achievement that went into creating the dragon, and you have something to acknowledge here. It isn't great cinema, but I'm glad I saw it". Jami Bernard of New York Daily News described the film as "a movie for people young enough to keep dragons in the menageries of their imaginations" and said that "the dragon is the most believable part of the whole movie". Ken Tucker of Entertainment Weekly gave the film a positive review, but criticized the fact that Sean Connery provided Draco's voice, saying that "if only Sean Connery didn't have such a wonderfully distinctive voice, Draco might live and breathe as his own creature".

Despite the lukewarm reception, Rob Cohen is very fond of the film: "Dragonheart pointed the way. There would be no Lord of the Rings without Dragonheart. We were the first to do a full CG acting character. But it's been very interesting. There's a great love for that film among a certain audience. And I get a lot of reactions from very unexpected quarters to that film, with people who saw it when they were young, or kids or teenagers, or women who are now of an advanced age that love it, and New Age people who found the spirituality in it very moving. I'm very proud of it".

=== Accolades ===
Award	Category	Recipients	Result
Academy Awards	Best Effects, Visual Effects	Scott Squires, Phil Tippett, James Straus, and Kit West	Nominated
Saturn Awards	Best Fantasy Film	Universal Pictures	Won
Saturn Awards	Best Costumes	Thomas Casterline and Anna B. Sheppard	Nominated
Saturn Awards	Best Music	Randy Edelman	Nominated
Saturn Awards	Best Special Effects	Scott Squires, Phil Tippett, James Straus, and Kit West	Nominated
Hollywood Film Awards	Hollywood Digital Award	Scott Squires	Won
Satellite Awards	Outstanding Visual Effects	Scott Squires	Nominated
Sitges Film Festival	Best Film	Rob Cohen	Nominated
Online Film & Television Association	Best Voice-Over Performance	Sean Connery	Won
Online Film & Television Association	Best Sci-Fi/Fantasy/Horror Picture	Raffaella De Laurentiis	Nominated
Online Film & Television Association	Best Visual Effects	Scott Squires, Phil Tippett, James Straus, Kit West	Nominated
Annie Awards	Best Individual Achievement: Voice Acting	Sean Connery	Nominated
Annie Awards	Best Individual Achievement: Animation	Rob Coleman	Nominated

== Legacy ==
In the years following its release and strong home media sales, Dragonheart gained a following and is considered a cult classic. The character of Draco also gained popularity, often being ranked as one of cinema's most memorable dragons, with fans noting him as ILM's best work on the heels of Jurassic Park and praising Sean Connery's vocal performance. In 2006, Draco was ranked no. 6 on a Top 10 list of movie dragons by Karl Heitmueller for MTV News.

=== 20th anniversary ===
On various days throughout the year in Toronto, the AMC Yonge & Dundas 24 theater screens a fully restored "20th anniversary edition" of Dragonheart with never-before-seen footage, enhanced visual effects, and a digitally remastered soundtrack. On May 31, 2016, celebrating the film's 20th anniversary, a retrospective article was published on the making of Dragonheart featuring Scott Squires and Phil Tippett, among others who worked on the film.

=== Sequel and prequels ===
A direct-to-video sequel to the film, Dragonheart: A New Beginning, was released in 2000, followed by three prequels: Dragonheart 3: The Sorcerer's Curse in 2015, Dragonheart: Battle for the Heartfire in 2017, and Dragonheart: Vengeance in 2020.

== Potential remake ==
In a 2013 MTV interview about his then-upcoming film 5-25-77, Dragonheart creator Patrick Read Johnson expressed a desire to remake the film with Sean Connery and Liam Neeson, his original choice for Bowen, before Universal fired Johnson from the project. In 2016, Matthew Feitshans, screenwriter of the Dragonheart prequels, said that Universal wanted to use the prequels to keep the film series' momentum up, mentioning the possibility and hopes of them leading to a big-budget remake of the original film. In 2018, Patrick Read Johnson reiterated that he was still interested in the project.

== Bibliography ==
- Duncan, Jody (1996). The Making of Dragonheart (Boulevard ed.). New York: Berkley Books. ISBN 978-1572971097. OCLC 34806374.
