= TIFF Next Wave =

Annual film festival in Toronto, Canada

TIFF Next Wave is an annual film festival in Toronto, Ontario. An offshoot of the Toronto International Film Festival, the Next Wave festival is held in spring each year, screening films of interest to teenagers and young adults selected by a committee of students from the city's high schools.

The festival was launched in 2012. It programs both a lineup of Canadian and international feature films, and a Young Creators Showcase program of short films by Canadian film students. The festival has also included special programs such as Battle of the Scores, a battle of the bands competition in which emerging musicians compete to compose and perform the best live score for a short film, the Next Wave Film Challenge, a competition which gives emerging filmmakers three days to make and complete a short film, and the Young Creators Co-Lab, which gives young content creators a chance to meet and network with film industry professionals.

Prior to 2012, film programming for both children and young adults was screened as part of a single Sprockets film festival.

Admission to the festival screenings is free for people under age 25, and $14 for people older than 25.

In addition to the standalone TIFF Next Wave festival, films of youth interest in the primary TIFF program also bear a "TIFF Next Wave" designation alongside their main program tag, and the organizing committee served as the jury for the Shawn Mendes Foundation Changemaker Award from 2020 to 2023.

== Programs ==
=== 2012 ===
English title	Original title	Director(s)	Production country
17 Girls	17 filles	Delphine and Muriel Coulin	France
Fat Kid Rules the World		Matthew Lillard	United States

=== 2013 ===
English title	Original title	Director(s)	Production country
5-25-77		Patrick Read Johnson	United States
Bushido Sixteen	Bushidō Shikkusutīn	Tomoyuki Furumaya	Japan
Dead Before Dawn		April Mullen	Canada
Earthbound		Alan Brennan	Ireland
Fame High		Scott Hamilton Kennedy	United States
Family Weekend		Benjamin Epps	United States
Ghost Graduation	Promoción fantasma	Javier Ruiz Caldera	Spain
Molly Maxwell		Sara St. Onge	Canada
Otelo Burning		Sara Blecher	South Africa
Struck by Lightning		Brian Dannelly	United States

=== 2014 ===
English title	Original title	Director(s)	Production country
A Birder's Guide to Everything		Rob Meyer	United States
Camp Takota		Chris Riedell, Nick Riedell	United States
Final Recipe		Gina Kim	South Korea
Fly Colt Fly		Adam Gray, Andrew Gray	Canada
For No Eyes Only		Tali Barde	Germany
G.B.F.		Darren Stein	United States
Gone Too Far!		Destiny Ekaragha	Nigeria, United Kingdom
I Learn America		Jean-Michel Dissard, Gitte Peng	United States
Leap 4 Your Life		Gary Hawes	Canada
Palo Alto		Gia Coppola	United States

=== 2015 ===
English title	Original title	Director(s)	Production country
52 Tuesdays		Sophie Hyde	Australia
Boy 7		Lourens Blok	Netherlands
Dessau Dancers		Jan Martin Scharf	Germany
Girlhood	Bande de filles	Céline Sciamma	France
Leave to Remain		Bruce Goodison	United Kingdom
Lily & Kat		Micael Preysler	United States
McFarland, USA		Niki Caro	United States
No Cameras Allowed		James Marcus Haney	United States
Partners in Crime	Kong Feng	Chang Jung-chi	Taiwan
Wet Bum		Lindsay MacKay	Canada
The Word	Obietnica	Anna Kazejak-Dawid	Poland

=== 2016 ===
English title	Original title	Director(s)	Production country
Ayanda		Sara Blecher	South Africa
Flocking	Flocken	Beata Gårdeler	Sweden
I Am Thalente		Natalie Johns	South Africa, United States
The Idol		Hany Abu-Assad	United Kingdom, Palestine, Qatar, Netherlands
Los Ángeles		Damian John Harper	Germany
Microbe & Gasoline	Microbe et Gasoil	Michel Gondry	France
Sing Street		John Carney	Ireland
Songs My Brothers Taught Me		Chloé Zhao	United States
Takin' Place		Cyrus Dowlatshahi	United States

=== 2017 ===
English title	Original title	Director(s)	Production country
1:54		Yan England	Canada
2 Fists Up		Spike Lee	United States
As You Are		Miles Joris-Peyrafitte	United States
Barakah Meets Barakah	Barakah yoqabil Barakah	Mahmoud Sabbagh	Saudi Arabia
Before I Fall		Ry Russo-Young	United States
Before the Streets	Avant les rues	Chloé Leriche	Canada
Divines		Houda Benyamina	France
Japanese Girls Never Die	Azumi Haruko wa yukue fumei	Daigo Matsui	Japan
The Young Offenders		Peter Foott	Ireland

=== 2018 ===
English title	Original title	Director(s)	Production country
Axolotl Overkill		Helene Hegemann	Germany
Bad Genius	Chalard Games Goeng	Nattawut Poonpiriya	Thailand
Bad Lucky Goat	El dia de la cabra	Samir Oliveros	Colombia
Barley Fields on the Other Side of the Mountain		Tian Tsering	United Kingdom
Beyond Dreams	Dröm vidare	Rojda Sekersöz	Sweden
Dayveon		Amman Abassi	United States
Fake Tattoos	Les faux tatouages	Pascal Plante	Canada
High Fantasy		Jenna Bass	South Africa
A Kid from Somewhere		Adam Beck, Paul Johnston	Canada
Love, Simon		Greg Berlanti	United States
Person to Person		Dustin Guy Defa	United States
Thoroughbreds		Cory Finley	United States

=== 2019 ===
English title	Original title	Director(s)	Production country
Blue My Mind		Lisa Brühlmann	Switzerland
Carmen & Lola	Carmen y Lola	Arantxa Echevarría	Spain
Jinn		Nijla Mu'min	United States
Ladyworld		Amanda Kramer	United States
Meteorites	Les Météorites	Romain Laguna	France
Minding the Gap		Bing Liu	United States
Respeto		Treb Monteras II	Philippines
Slut in a Good Way	Charlotte a du fun	Sophie Lorain	Canada
Socrates		Alexandre Moratto	Brazil
Virus Tropical		Santiago Caicedo	Colombia

=== 2020 ===
English title	Original title	Director(s)	Production country
And Then We Danced	Da chven vitsek'vet	Levan Akin	Georgia, Sweden
Angelfish		Peter Lee	United States
Children of the Sea	Kaijū no Kodomo	Ayumu Watanabe	Japan
CRSHD		Emily Cohn	United States
House of Hummingbird	벌새	Kim Bora	South Korea
Kuessipan		Myriam Verreault	Canada
Papicha		Mounia Meddour	Algeria
Premature		Rashaad Ernesto Green	United States
Selah and the Spades		Tayarisha Poe	United States
Sequin in a Blue Room		Samuel Van Grinsven	Australia
Take Me Somewhere Nice		Ena Sendijarević	Netherlands, Bosnia and Herzegovina
Your Turn	Espero tua (re)volta	Eliza Capai	Brazil

=== 2021 ===
English title	Original title	Director(s)	Production country
Beans		Tracey Deer	Canada
Cocoon	Kokon	Leonie Krippendorff	Germany
Death of Nintendo		Raya Martin	Philippines
La Leyenda Negra		Patricia Vidal Delgado	United States
My Name Is Baghdad	Meu nome é Bagdá	Caru Alves de Souza	Brazil
The Night of the Beast	La noche de la bestia	Mauricio Leiva Cock	Colombia, Mexico
Scales	Sayidat Al Bahr	Shahad Ameen	Saudi Arabia, United Arab Emirates, Iraq
Summertime		Carlos López Estrada	United States
Tahara		Olivia Peace	United States
Unapologetic		Ashley O'Shay	United States

=== 2022 ===
English title	Original title	Director(s)	Production country
4 Feet High		Maria Belen Poncio, Rosario Perazolo Masjoan	Argentina/France
The Braves	Entre les vagues	Anaïs Volpé	France
Casablanca Beats	Haut et fort	Nabil Ayouch	Morocco, France
The Fam	La Mif	Fred Baillif	France
Freda		Gessica Généus	Haiti
Girl Picture	Tytöt tytöt tytöt	Alli Haapasalo	Finland
I Don't Wanna Dance		Flynn von Kleist	Netherlands
It's a Summer Film!	Summer Film Ni Notte	Soushi Matsumoto	Japan
Slash/Back		Nyla Innuksuk	Canada
Stop-Zemlia	Стоп-Земля	Kateryna Gornostai	Ukraine

=== 2023 ===
==== Official selections ====
English title	Original title	Director(s)	Production country
Adolfo		Sofía Auza	Mexico, United States
Egghead & Twinkie		Sarah Kambe Holland	United States
Liquor Store Dreams		So Yun Um	United States
The Lost Boys	Le Paradis	Zeno Graton	Belgium
Motherhood	La Maternal	Pilar Palomero	Spain
The Ordinaries		Sophie Linnenbaum	Germany
Scrapper		Charlotte Regan	United Kingdom
Summer Scars	Nos cérémonies	Simon Rieth	France
Summer with Hope	Tabestan Ba Omid	Sadaf Foroughi	Canada, Iran

==== Young Creators Showcase ====
English title	Original title	Director(s)	Production country
Castaway		Shamiso Chigwende	Canada
Execution Triptych		Giran Findlay Liu	Canada
Hoa		Tram Anh Nguyen	Canada, Vietnam
In the Whiteness		Niya Ahmed Abdullahi	Canada
Inside Groove		Elizabeth Wei Yun Albrecht	Canada
Late Bloomer		Emma Cheuk	Canada
The Mess We're In		Jamie Lam	Canada
Ms. Butterworth's Cherry Pie		Cameron Lightly	Canada
On the Cosmic Shore		Luvleen Hunjan	Canada, India
Ozigwan (Tail of Serpent)		Cole Forrest	Canada
Shallots and Garlic	Bawang Merah Bawang Putih	Andrea Nirmala Widjajanto	Canada, Indonesia
What Will You Do When I'm Gone?	majboor-e-mamool	Haaris Qadri	Canada
The Year Long Boulder		Brielle LeBlanc	Canada

=== 2024 ===
English title	Original title	Director(s)	Production country
Big Boys		Corey Sherman	United States
Disco Afrika: A Malagasy Story		Luck Razanajaona	France, Madagascar, Germany, Mauritius, South Africa
Gamma Rays	Les Rayons gamma	Henry Bernadet	Canada
Girls Will Be Girls		Shuchi Talati	India
Hoard		Luna Carmoon	United Kingdom
Paradise Is Burning	Paradiset Brinner	Mika Gustafson	Denmark, Finland, Italy, Sweden
Power Alley	Levante	Lillah Halla	Brazil, France, Uruguay
She Sat There Like All Ordinary Ones	Kai Shi De Qiang	Youjia Qu	China
A Song Sung Blue	Xiao Bai Chuan	Zihan Geng	China

=== 2025 ===
English title	Original title	Director(s)	Production country
Brides		Nadia Fall	United Kingdom
The Dog Thief	El ladrón de perros	Vinko Tomičić Salinas	Bolivia, Chile, Mexico, France, Ecuador
Manas		Marianna Brennand	Brazil, Portugal
Pools		Sam Hayes	United States
Queens of Drama	Les reines du drame	Alexis Langlois	France, Belgium
Rape Play		Gabriella Mykal	United States
Seaside Serendipity	海辺へ行く道	Satoko Yokohama	Japan
The Virgin of the Quarry Lake	La Virgen de la Tosquera	Laura Casabé	Argentina, Spain, Mexico
We Were Dangerous		Josephine Stewart-Te Whiu	New Zealand
Where the Wind Comes From		Amel Guellaty	Tunisia, France, Qatar

=== 2026 ===
English title	Original title	Director(s)	Production country
Big Girls Don't Cry		Paloma Schneideman	New Zealand
Burn		Makoto Nagahisa	Japan
CAMP		Avalon Fast	Canada
High School Musical 3: Senior Year; Interactive screening hosted by Miss Moço		Kenny Ortega	United States
If I Go Will They Miss Me		Walter Thompson-Hernández	United States
Ish		Imran Perretta	United Kingdom
Isle Child		Thomas Percy Kim	United States
Kids	Niñxs	Kani Lapuerta	Mexico
Our Hero, Balthazar		Oscar Boyson	United States
Roommates		Chandler Levack	United States
Thanks for Nothing	Danke für nichts	Stella Marie Markert	Germany
