= I Don't Wanna Dance =

I Don't Want to Dance or I Don't Wanna Dance may refer to:

== Songs ==
- "I Don't Wanna Dance" (Split Enz song)
- "I Don't Wanna Dance" (Eddy Grant song)
- "I Don't Wanna Dance" (Alex Gaudino song)
- "I Don't Wanna Dance" (Hey Monday song)
- "I Don't Wanna Dance" by Itzy
- "I Don't Want to Dance" by The Little Ones (2008)
- "Don't Wanna Dance" (MØ song)

== Albums ==
- I Don't Want to Dance, an album by Loftland
- Don't Wanna Dance, an album by Tom Gaebel

== Other uses ==
- I Don't Wanna Dance (film), a 2021 Dutch drama
- "I Don't Want to Dance", episode of Little Princess
