= Ironman (novel) =

Novel by Chris Crutcher

- Author: Chris Crutcher
- Cover artist: Chris Crutcher
- Language: English
- Genre: Young adult novel
- Publisher: HarperCollins
- Publication date: 1995
- Publication place: United States
- Media type: Print (Paperback)
- Pages: 228 pp
- ISBN: 0-06-059840-9
- OCLC: 56725458
- Preceded by: Staying Fat for Sarah Byrnes
- Followed by: Whale Talk

Ironman is a 1995 novel by young adult writer Chris Crutcher who studied art and literature at the University of Notre Dame in his twenties. He created the novel's cover image himself using the medium of oil pastel.

The novel is the story of Bo Brewster, a high school student training for a triathlon while also in disputes with his father and English teacher, both of whom exhibit portentous views of masculine authority. The book is written as a combination of traditional third person narrative and epistolary novel through a series of informal letters written by the protagonist to CNN personality Larry King. The novel has received numerous accolades including being recognized by the American Library Association as a Best Book for Young Adults.

== Plot summary ==
The story takes place in Spokane, Washington where Beauregard (Bo) Brewster lives with his mother and younger brother Jordan. Motivated by years of power struggles with his father, the teenager trains vigorously for the Yukon Jack Ironman Triathlon while attending anger management sessions and writing letters to Larry King about his experiences.

Bo wants to participate in the Yukon Jack, a biking-running-swimming triathlon. After the latest dispute with his English teacher lands him in anger management, Bo is brought face-to-face with his own family problems (namely his difficult relationship with his father), and has his eyes opened to the issues his classmates are dealing with. Bo receives support in his training and his life from the anger management teacher, a Japanese cowboy known as Mr Nak, and from Bo's mentor, "Lion" Serbousek, a teacher who also coaches the swim team. Bo comes to be inspired and supported by the group of supposed delinquents he meets in anger management, deals with the realization that Mr S. is gay, and starts dating his classmate Shelly, whose athleticism surpasses even Bo's own. Extra trouble arrives with Wyrak, a swimmer and a bully who clashes with Bo, and then bets Shelly he can beat Bo in the Yukon Jack. But with the help of the other kids in the anger management group, Bo overcomes the obstacles and meets his goal, to compete in the Yukon Jack triathlon, and also beats Wyrack.

== Characters ==
- Beauregard "Bo" Brewster is the narrator and protagonist. Bo is humorous with his father and has been forced to join anger management. Bo attempts to deal with his feelings by training to become a triathlete. Works hard to understand himself through Mr. Nak's class, because his life at home isn't the best and in school isn't great with Mr. Redmond and Wyrack at the swim team.
- Mr. Nakatani is a teacher who is in charge of the school's anger management group. Mr. Nak is calm and patient with his "eclectic mix of hard-edged students." Some of the "truants'" names are Elvis, Shuja, and Hedgie. Of Asian descent, Mr. Nak has a Texas accent, a cowboy attitude, and the determination of a martial artist.
- Lionel Serbousek is Bo's supportive journalism teacher and mentor. Bo struggles to cope with his discovery that Mr. Serbousek is homosexual. Mr. Serbousek is also a character in Crutcher's other novel, Stotan.
- Shelly is Bo's girlfriend and another member of the Anger Management group. She is an athlete like Bo, training to be an American Gladiator, and she encourages Bo to train for his triathlon and to stand up to Ian Wyrack. Her past is as fraught with conflict and tragedy as the other members of Anger Management, but unlike them, she is there by choice because she wants to avoid repeating the past.
- Ian Wyrack is a college student who trains under Mr. Serbousek, and who comes into conflict with Bo when Bo joins the team's workouts. Wyrack resents the fact that Bo is faster than he, and later bets Bo's girlfriend 500 dollars that his relay team can beat Bo in the Yukon Jack triathlon.
- Lucas Brewster is Bo's father and the main antagonist. He is controlling and authoritarian, and Bo comes into frequent conflict with him. He is divorced from Bo's mother, but although Bo and his brother live with their mom, they still see their dad frequently.

== Awards and honors ==
- 1996 Quick Picks for Reluctant Young Adult Readers (ALABest Books For Young Adults]] (ALA)
