= Athletic Shorts: Six Short Stories =

Book by Chris Crutcher

- First edition
- Author: Chris Crutcher
- Language: English
- Genre: Young adult novel
- Published: 1991 (Greenwillow Books)
- Publication place: United States
- Media type: Print (hardback & paperback)
- Pages: 208 pp
- ISBN: 0-06-050783-7
- OCLC: 51946831

Athletic Shorts: Six Short Stories is a young adult fiction short story collection by Chris Crutcher. Most of the stories are related to Crutcher's early work and often come from his experience as a family counselor. This book also contains the short story "A Brief Moment in the Life of Angus Bethune" which first appeared in Connections, edited by Donald R. Gallo, published in 1989 by Delacorte Press. It was adapted into the film Angus. The novel has been met with challenges from school districts due to the book's inclusion of offensive language, homosexuality, and sexual content, and was the fourth most challenged book in 2006.

== Short stories ==
=== A Brief Moment in the Life of Angus Bethune ===
Angus Bethune (narrator) is an overweight student and football player at Lake Michigan High School who has constantly struggled with his self-image and family structure. As a result of his parents' divorce, he has four parents and has always been known as "the big kid" to both his family and his peers. The beginning of the story reveals to the reader that the Winter Ball at Lake Michigan High is tonight, and the girl of Angus' dreams, Melissa Lefevre, has been nominated Queen. Knowing this, Angus is forced to either show up and risk embarrassment or stay home and face humiliation. He decides to attend the Ball and describes his anxiety to the reader from the moment he walks in the door. In going to the dance, Angus discovers that Melissa herself has struggled with her body image and that she is in treatment for bulimia. He soon encounters Melissa and her boyfriend Rick Sanford, a teammate of Angus, who is described as a "real jerk". Through dubious means, Angus is nominated the King of the Winter Ball and is bullied by Rick after being given the news. He quickly puts Rick in his place and has a successful dance with Melissa. Body image and social perception are strong themes in this short, upbeat story. The author, Crutcher, offers advice to the reader through Grandpa Bethune, a character with whom Angus often found solace: "Screw 'em. Anybody who doesn't like the way you look, screw 'em".

=== The Pin ===
Johnny Rivers (narrator) is a wrestler at Coho High School in Coho, Montana. His father, Cecil B. Rivers, was also a champion wrestler at Coho and later at the University of Oklahoma. Johnny reveals to the reader that he and his father "don't always see eye to eye," also implying that he is often abused by his father, especially when Cecil feels like he has "lost control" Johnny discusses his less-than-ideal family life and how his father's decision to have children, among other things, has gradually caused a strain on their relationship. Johnny cites the constant pressure he finds himself in, as his mother is against Johnny pursuing wrestling, while Cecil constantly reminds Johnny of his legacy. Johnny and Cecil's relationship is truly one of love and hate; however, it comes to a head one day when Johnny challenges Cecil to a father/son wrestling match. Johnny wins and instantly regrets humiliating his father in front of a crowd. Cecil loses control and slaps Johnny to the ground in front of everyone, and then walks away. Later, Johnny finds his father weeping in his den, and realizes that Cecil's father was also a hard man and that Cecil has some regrets about the type of man he is to his wife and children. Later, during the Winter Sports Award Banquet, Cecil apologizes to Johnny. Johnny Rivers and Petey Shropshrire (briefly mentioned) were originally featured as characters in Crutcher's young adult novel The Crazy Horse Electric Game.

=== The Other Pin ===
This story, told in the third person, focuses on Petey Shropshrire, a friend of Johnny Rivers who wrestles junior varsity for Coho High School in Coho, Montana. The beginning of the story centers around a wrestling team meeting, in which Petey and Johnny's coach needs someone to wrestle Chris Byers, the best wrestler at the 119 weight class at Spring Hill High, who also happens to be a girl. Everyone on the team, including Johnny and Petey, is reluctant to volunteer themselves, and Petey is forced to fight when Johnny pinches his leg. The story says "Nobody wants to wrestle Chris Byers". She is one of the best wrestlers in the state, and the ridicule that Petey faces as he prepares for the match is almost unbearable. He talks with Chris, who he has met with Johnny Rivers before under unfortunate circumstances. He discovers that the ridicule she faces as a female wrestler is something that she is tired of as well. They hatch a plan, and when it comes time for them to wrestle, they put on a World Wrestling Federation type performance that is entertaining but faked, and it costs the entire match for Coho High. Petey and Chris become close by the end of the story. Later, the reader learns that Petey is punished by having to run the bleachers every day of the week. Petey and Johnny were originally featured as characters in Crutcher's young adult novel The Crazy Horse Electric Game.

=== Goin' Fishin ===
Lionel "Lion" Serousek is a high school senior swimmer for Frost High School. His parents and little brother were killed in a drunk driving (boating) accident by his best friend Neal Anderson which he has never been able to forgive. Neal, riddled with guilt over his actions, has been living on the streets and Lion spurns a heartfelt plea from Neal's mother to forgive her son so that he can come home again. After three years of hating Neal, his friend Elaine Ferral convinces him that her friendship might be more important that his hatred for Neal. The story concludes with Lion finally going in search of Neal, who has an emotional breakdown upon finding him. Lion invites Neal go fishing with him in the hopes that they can finally reconcile. Lion and other minor characters are originally featured in Crutcher's young adult novel Stotan!; an older Lionel is also a minor character in his novel, Ironman.

=== Telephone Man ===
The Telephone Man (narrator) is a young boy named Jack Simpson who is on the autism spectrum. The story begins with the narrator explaining his current social situation: he has to deal with the public scrutiny he has received from many of his peers. He is removed from Oakland High and placed into OMLC, a school which Telephone Man describes as a place for "kids who are 'eccentric' along with kids who should be in prison". The narrator is given the title "Telephone Man" by his peers as a derogatory nickname solely due to his fascination with telephone equipment, which he describes as "...the most important thing I have". Telephone Man's father Carl, who he describes as a privately racist, yet publicly civil man, has passed down his language to his son, who seemingly has no filter. Throughout the story, Telephone Man endures several hardships in his new school, but by the end, he is able to befriend Hawk, who he viewed as "...the toughest guy in the world". Chris Crutcher says the book is about "how bigotry flows down the generational river through innocence".

=== In the Time I Get ===
The final story, "In the Time I Get," explores Louie Banks's encounter with a young, gay man who is dying of AIDS. Again, Crutcher is dealing with a controversial subject, but as with "Telephone Man" and all of the other stories in Athletic Shorts, he is doing so to teach the importance of acceptance. The man suffering from AIDS, Darren, divulges to Louie that since his diagnosis, no one, even people with whom he shares a close relationship, will touch him. This makes his life very lonely. At first, Louie, too, is afraid to be round Darren and avoids him at all costs, but after some reflection he decides to give Darren a chance, and eventually Louie goes as far as holding Darren's hand in the hospital. Louie understands the risks involved in daring to care for someone who is different, and even loses his best friend as a result. In the end, though, Louie knows that he has made the right decision in choosing to be there for Darren when he most needed a friend.

== Reception ==
Despite the many challenges and bans to the book, Crutcher's work has been praised by peers in the industry for its relatability and its discussions on race relations. Through the hardship that several characters endure and eventually overcome across every story in the book, Crutcher's work frequently mentions the concept of pain and how it affects character development. In a book review, writer Dan Webster says about Crutcher: "His value comes from showing how while sometimes that abuse destroys you, other times it makes you stronger". Nancy Vasilakis, a writer from Horn Book Magazine, described the central ideas from the book by saying "The issues of father-son relationships, sexuality, and the testing of personal limits — all central themes in young adult literature — are explored from an unconventional perspective in Athletic Shorts".

=== Awards ===
Athletic Shorts has received the following accolades:

- 1992 – American Library Association (ALA) Best Books for Young Adults
- 1992 – Michigan Library Association Thumbs Up! Best Young Adult Book Award
- 1992 – School Library Journal Best Book of the Year
- 1996 – ALA Notable Children's Recordings, narrated by Frank Muller
- 2000 – Popular Paperbacks for Young Adults: Short Takes

=== Controversy ===
According to the American Library Association, Athletic Shorts has frequently been banned and challenged due to LGBTQIA+ content and offensive language. The book landed the 63rd position in the 100 most banned and challenged books in the United States between 1990 and 1999, as well as the 44th position between 2000 and 2009. It was also the fourth most banned and challenged book in 2006.

=== Challenges ===
In 1999, Athletic Shorts: Six Short Stories was removed from the Anchorage, Alaska school district's eighth-grade curriculum after a parent complained about its use of homosexuality and its examples of disrespect toward parents.

In 2004, Athletic Shorts was challenged in Atchinson, Kansas, after the sister of a student of color at the local high school argued that her sibling would be offended by the explicit language used in the stories. While the book was ultimately retained, Crutcher met with the student and emphasized her bravery to challenge the book, defending her right to do so.

Athletic Shorts was challenged again in 2004 in Solon, Iowa, when a man named Doug Singkofer argued that the story "directly contradicts and undermines the beliefs and teachings of our faith". The story was banned and later appealed.

In 2005, Athletic Shorts was challenged in Grand Rapids, Michigan, after a parent complained about one of the stories' ("Telephone Man") usage of a racially derogatory term. The challenge was successful, as the book was removed from schools and libraries in the area.

In 2010, Athletic Shorts was challenged in the Gregory-Portland Independent School District in Corpus Christi, Texas, following a parent's complaint about sexual content, and racist and foul language. Ultimately it was not banned.
