= The Sledding Hill =

2005 book by Chris Crutcher

- Author: Chris Crutcher
- Language: English
- Genre: Young adult novel
- Publisher: Greenwillow Press
- Publication date: 2005
- Publication place: United States
- Media type: Print (Paperback)
- Pages: 230 pp
- ISBN: 0-06-050243-6
- OCLC: 56560645
- LC Class: PZ7.C89 Sl 2005
- Preceded by: Whale Talk
- Followed by: Deadline

The Sledding Hill is a 2005 post-modern metafictional novel by young adult writer Chris Crutcher.

== Plot summary ==
The novel is narrated by the late Billy Bartholomew, the best friend of the protagonist, Eddie Proffit. Eddie is an intelligent boy who is seemingly afflicted with ADHD. After the death of two important figures of his life in quick succession, his father and his best friend, Eddie refuses to speak. He begins talking again when he testifies in front of the Red Brick Church announcing he will not only not join the church, but will also speak in favor of Warren Peece at the school board meeting. A misinterpretation of his testimony compels the church members to have Eddie placed into a mental health facility supposedly because Eddie thinks he is Jesus Christ. Crutcher places himself in the novel's climax as a speaker at the board meeting on the removal of the book.
