= Chris Crutcher =

American novelist and family therapist

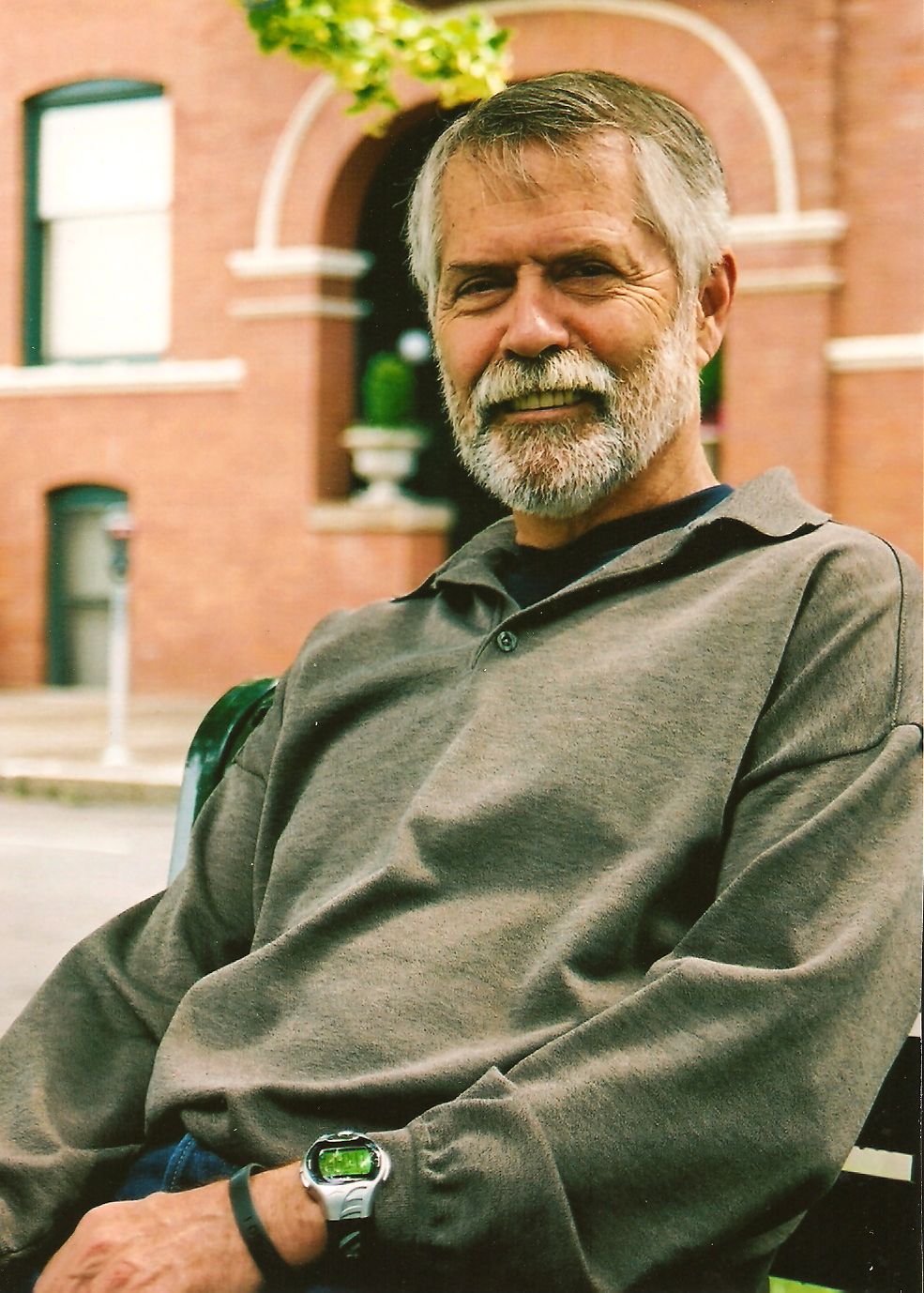
- Born: July 17, 1946 (age 80); Dayton, Ohio, U.S.
- Education: Eastern Washington State College (BA)
- Occupation: Writer
- Writing career
- Period: 1983–present
- Genres: Young Adult novels, short stories
- Notable awards: Margaret A. Edwards Award; 2000
- Website: www.chriscrutcher.com

Chris Crutcher (born July 17, 1946) is an American novelist and a family therapist. He received the Margaret A. Edwards Award from the American Library Association in 2000 for his lifetime contribution in writing for teens.

== Biography ==
Crutcher was born July 17, 1946, to a World War II B17 bomber pilot and a homemaker in Dayton, Ohio. A few weeks after his birth, his father gave up flying and the family moved to his mother's hometown of Cascade, Idaho, where his father could open an oil and gas wholesale business and he could grow up.

After graduating from high school, Crutcher attended Eastern Washington State College (now Eastern Washington University) where he swam competitively and earned a BA in psychology and sociology. With no post-graduation plans or prospects, he went back to Eastern and got a teaching certificate.

Crutcher taught at several primary and secondary schools in California and Washington before beginning his writing career. After his first book was completed, he joined Spokane's Child Protection Team and began practicing as a child and family therapist.

== Writing ==
Crutcher's debut novel was Running Loose in 1983 about a senior in high school who has it all until life throws him for a few loops. Many of his novels concern teenaged athletes who have personal problems. Most of his protagonists are male, teenage athletes, often swimmers, and recurring supporting characters include a wise Asian-American teacher or coach and a caring journalism teacher.

Chris Crutcher's writing is controversial, and has been frequently challenged and even banned by individuals who want to censor his books by removing them from libraries and classrooms. Athletic Shorts: Six Short Stories and Running Loose were #63 and #92 on the ALA list of 100 books most frequently challenged during the 1990s. His books generally feature teens coping with serious problems, including abusive parents, racial and religious prejudice, mental and physical disability, and poverty; these themes are viewed by some as too mature for children. Other cited reasons for censorship include strong language and depictions of homosexuality. Despite this controversy, Crutcher's writing has received many awards.

Crutcher has also written an autobiography called King of the Mild Frontier (2003), an adult novel titled The Deep End (1991), and two collections of short stories, Athletic Shorts: Six Short Stories (1991) and Angry Management (2009), some of which further explore characters from his previous novels. One of the stories from Athletic Shorts: Six Short Stories, "A Brief Moment in the Life of Angus Bethune", was made into a film called Angus.

The ALA Margaret Edwards Award recognizes one writer and a particular body of work for "significant and lasting contribution to young adult literature" and "helping adolescents become aware of themselves and addressing questions about their role and importance in relationships, society, and in the world." Crutcher won the annual award in 2000 when the panel cited six books published from 1983 to 1993: Running Loose, Stotan!, The Crazy Horse Electric Game, Chinese Handcuffs, Athletic Shorts, and Staying Fat for Sarah Byrnes (‡). All were edited by Susan Hirschman at Greenwillow Books. The panel chair observed that "[h]is stories bring to life the contemporary teen world, including its darker side. Sarah Byrnes suffers facial deformity caused by her father's deliberate cruelty. Jennifer Lawless dreads the nights her stepfather forces his sexual advances on her. ... Crutcher takes teenagers seriously and cares about them."

== Awards ==
- 1993 – The ALAN Award from The Assembly on Literature for Adolescents for Significant Contribution to Adolescent Literature
- 1998 – The National Council of Teachers of English (NCTE/SLATE) Intellectual Freedom Award for advancing the cause of intellectual freedom
- 2000 ALA Edwards Award
- 2004 – The Writer magazine Writers Who Make a Difference Award
- 2005 – Catholic Library Association St. Katherine Drexel Award for outstanding contribution to the growth of high school librarianship
- 2005 – Intellectual Freedom Award from the National Coalition Against Censorship

The ALA has named eight of his books to the annual list of "Best Books for Young Adults".

== Selected works ==
=== Books ===
- Running Loose (1983) ‡
- Stotan! (1986) ‡
- The Crazy Horse Electric Game (1990 +
- Chinese Handcuffs (1989) ‡
- Athletic Shorts: Six Short Stories (1991) ‡
- The Deep End (1992)
- Staying Fat for Sarah Byrnes (1993) ‡
- Ironman (1995)
- Whale Talk (2001)
- King of the Mild Frontier: An Ill-Advised Autobiography (2003)
- The Sledding Hill (2005)
- Deadline (2007)
- Angry Management (2009)
- Period 8 (2013)
- Losers Bracket (2018)

=== Short stories ===
- "A Brief Moment in the Life of Angus Bethune" – First appeared in Connections, edited by Donald R. Gallo, published in 1989 by Delacorte Press. Also published in Crutcher's collection Athletic Shorts: Six Short Stories. Adapted into a film in 1995.
- "Superboy" – Ultimate Sports: Short Stories by Outstanding Writers for Young Adults, edited by Donald R. Gallo, published in 1995 by Delacorte Books for Young Readers.
- "Popeye the Sailor" – Dirty Laundry: Stories About Family Secrets, edited by Lisa Rowe Fraustino, published in 1998 Viking Juvenile.
- "Fourth and Too Long" – Time Capsule: Short Stories About Teenagers Throughout the Twentieth Century, edited by Donald R. Gallo, published in 1999 by Laurel Leaf.
- "Guns for Geeks" – On the Fringe, edited by Donald R. Gallo, published in 2001 by Dial Books.
- "'O' Foods" – Guys Write for Guys Read, edited by Jon Scieszka, published in 2005 by Viking. (Autobiographic)
