= Loftland =

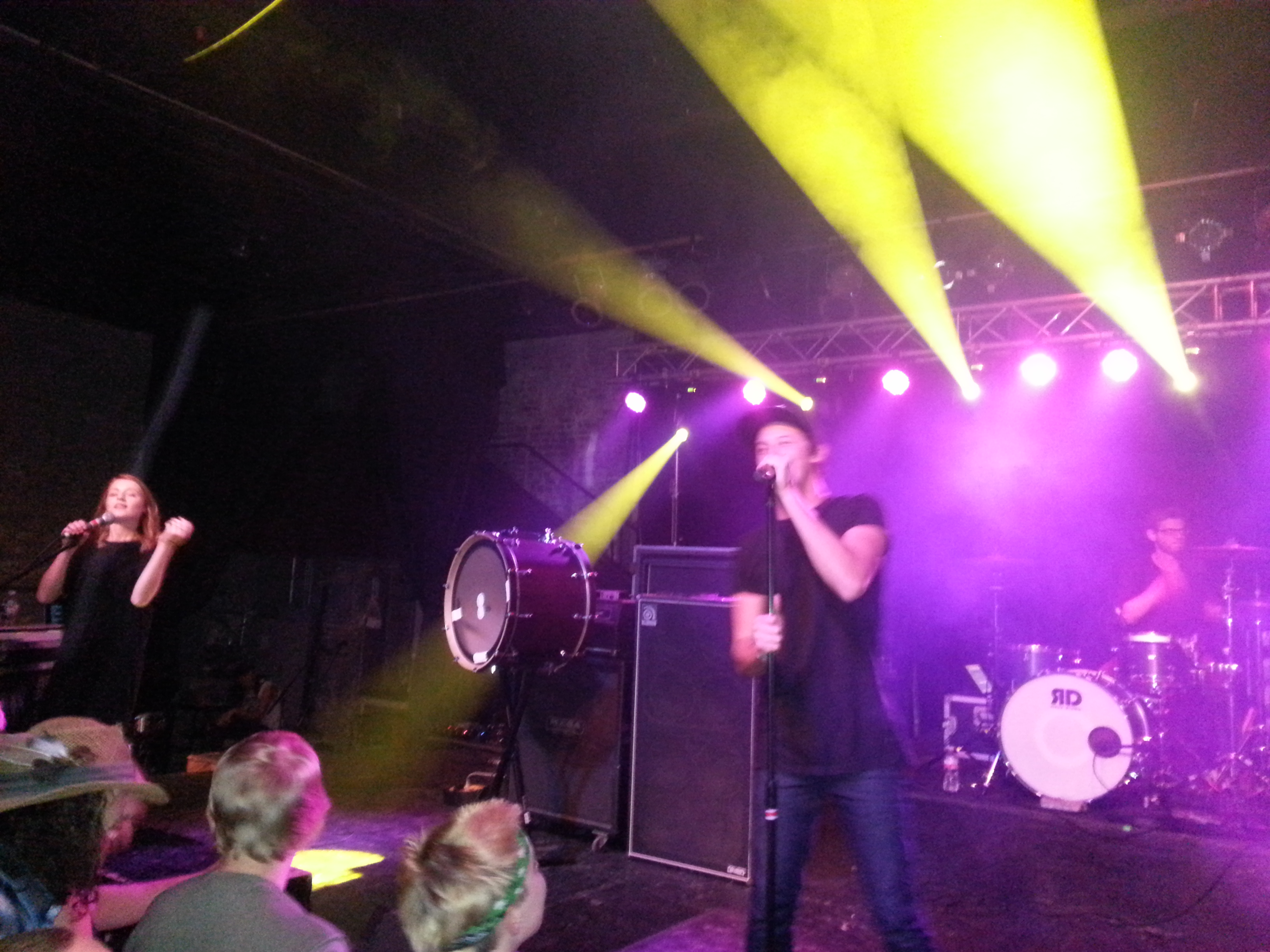

Background information
- Origin: Madison, Wisconsin
- Genres: Contemporary Christian music, EDM, dance-pop
- Years active: 2006–2016
- Label: Dream
- Members: Dominic "Dom" Gibbs; Madeline "Maddy" Gibbs; Tanner Gibbs
- Past members: Alex Klingenberg; Joey McGuire; Ben Pepin; Steven Priske; Zach Wilke
- Website: loftlandband.com

Loftland was an American contemporary Christian music and electronic dance music band from Madison, Wisconsin, and they were formed in 2006. Members included vocalist Dominic Gibbs, keyboardist and backing vocalist Madeline "Maddie" Gibbs (née, Macco), and guitarist Tanner Gibbs. Their debut studio album, I Don't Want to Dance, was released through Dream Records in 2014.

== Background ==
The CCM and EDM band formed in Madison, Wisconsin, in 2006, with the brothers Dominic and Tanner Gibbs, and bassist Steven Priske as the core of the group. Drummer Alex Klingenberg was also an early part of the band. The band released two Alternative Rock EPs, Shh... Just Listen in 2009, and A Whole New Direction in 2010. Ben Pepin also joined the band in 2011 (guitars, keys, backing vocals). Shortly after this, Klingenberg left the band and was replaced by Zach Wilke, and the band followed up their previous EP with 2013's Let's Make it Loud with a noticeably more pop induced feel. Following this, Priske and Wilke simultaneously left the group, the latter of which was replaced with drummer Joey McGuire. Loftland soon after signed to Dream Records and released their first, and as of yet, only studio album, I Don't Want to Dance. Pepin left the group in 2015, and Dominic's wife, Madeline "Maddie" Gibbs (née, Macco), joined the group.

Loftland disbanded in 2016, with Dominic and Madeline focusing on another musical project called Tennies.

== Music history ==
The group formed in 2006, with their first studio album, I Don't Want to Dance, released on February 18, 2014 by Dream Records. The album was reviewed by Christian Music Review, Christian Music Zine, CM Addict, Cross Rhythms, HM Magazine, Indie Vision Music, Jesus Freak Hideout, Jesus Wired, and New Release Tuesday.

== Members ==
Current members

- Dominic "Dom" Gibbs
- Madeline "Maddie" Gibbs (née, Macco)
- Tanner Gibbs

Former members

- Alex Klingenberg
- Joey McGuire
- Ben Pepin
- Steven Priske
- Zach Wilke
- Nic Signer

== Discography ==
Studio albums

- I Don't Want to Dance (February 18, 2014, Dream)

EPs

- Shhh... Just Listen EP, (2009, Independent)
- A New Direction EP, (2010, Independent)
- Let's Make It Loud EP, (2013, Independent)
