= Palo Alto (2007 film) =

- Directed by: Brad Leong
- Written by: Brad Leong; Tony Vallone
- Produced by: Daniel Engelhardt
- Starring: Aaron Ashmore; Johnny Lewis; Justin Mentell; Autumn Reeser; Ben Savage; Tom Arnold
- Cinematography: Rachel Morrison
- Edited by: Kevin Gasca, Daniel J Walker
- Music by: Geoffrey Pope
- Release date: April 29, 2007 (Tribeca)
- Running time: 100 minutes
- Country: United States
- Language: English

Palo Alto is a 2007 independent film that is set in Palo Alto, California and was made by Brad Leong, Tony Vallone, and Daniel Engelhardt, three filmmakers who are locals of that city. The plot centers on four college freshmen on their last night of Thanksgiving break, their first time back since leaving for school.

Palo Alto stars Aaron Ashmore, Johnny Lewis, Justin Mentell, Autumn Reeser, Ben Savage and Tom Arnold.

== Plot ==
The film opens with four college freshmen—Alec, Nolan, Patrick and Ryan—sneaking into an old classroom to retrieve an item confiscated by a freshman high school teacher. Their conversation is interrupted when campus security discovers them. The friends dart through the halls of the school and manage to avoid capture. Now in front of Palo Alto High, the friends say their goodbyes for the evening.

Alone and concerned his night will end with no excitement, Alec befriends an older fraternity brother, Anthony. The two quickly bond through mutual initiation stories, and the admiration Alec has for the more experienced partier.

On a school bus, Morgan, in his twenty-fifth year as a bus driver, discovers his old passenger Nolan at a public bus stop. The two catch up and Morgan tries his luck as cupid by inviting a young girl on board (Jaime). Nolan and Jaime continue, inventing adventures.

Patrick is visiting Amy, his girlfriend of four years. Patrick attempts to explain his vision of the future, which, of course, includes Amy. She quickly cuts him off to break his heart and destroy his neatly planned life.

When Ryan arrives at Audrey's house, he expects to get some action and leave quickly. He is shocked to hear she wants more than a physical relationship. Disgusted with his reaction, Audrey steals his car – leaving him stranded with her grandmother. The two hit the streets in her aging automobile looking for Audrey.

The four boys' stories continue throughout the night, briefly intersecting, before the sun rises and they all leave home again.

== Cast ==
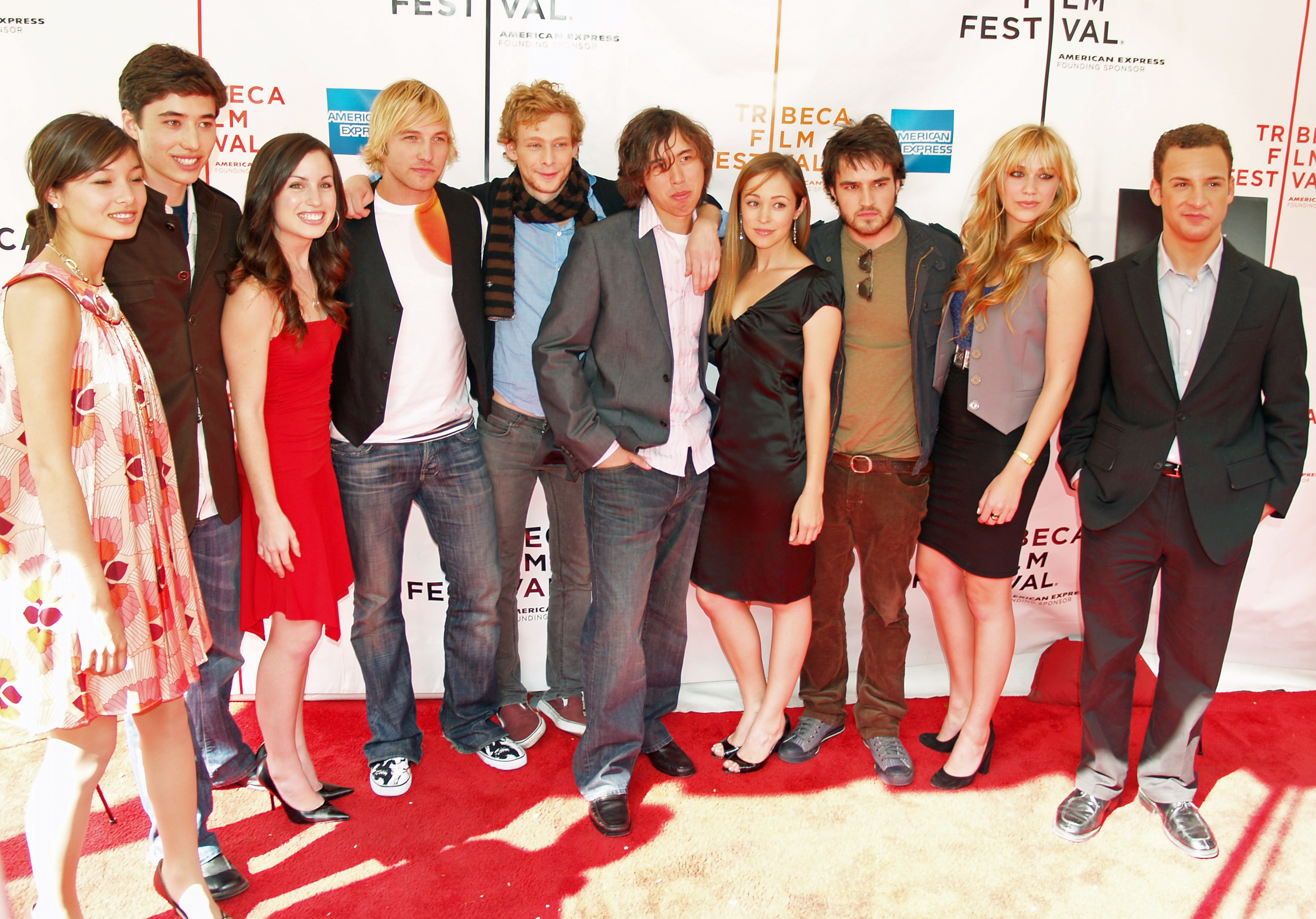
The cast at the Tribeca Film Festival premiere

- Aaron Ashmore as Alec
- Johnny Lewis as Nolan
- Justin Mentell as Ryan
- Autumn Reeser as Jaime
- Ben Savage as Patrick
- Ryan Hansen as Anthony
- Connor Ross as Andrew
- Eve Brent as Susan Pierce
- Shoshana Bush as Audrey
- Tom Arnold as Morgan
- Robin Hines as Becky
- Matthew Castellana as Danny Yates
- Jason McMahon as Dave, the Stoner
- Edward Singletary as Doctor
- Hailey Bright as Jessica
- Christina DeRosa as Ashley
- Jay Joshua Hoffman as Jay Bob
- Alona Lewis as EMT
- Luka Apt as Party Boy
