= 5-25-77 =

2017 film by Patrick Read Johnson

- Directed by: Patrick Read Johnson
- Written by: Patrick Read Johnson
- Produced by: Leigh Jones; Fred Roos; William Holmes; Gary Kurtz; Peter Bowers
- Starring: John Francis Daley; Austin Pendleton; Colleen Camp; Neil Flynn; Scott Rans; Mark Kolar; Neal Olson; Emmi Chen; Steven Coulter; Justin Mentell
- Cinematography: David Blood; Ken Seng
- Edited by: Alain K. Blair; Kat Thomas; Alex Creager
- Music by: Alan Parsons; David E. Russo
- Production companies: Moonwatcher Inc.; Sparta Entertainment; Filmio Original Pictures; MVD Entertainment
- Distributed by: MVD Entertainment Group
- Release dates: May 22, 2017 (Genesee Theatre); September 23, 2022 (United States)
- Running time: 132 minutes
- Country: United States
- Language: English

5-25-77, released as 25-5-77 in the United Kingdom, is a 2022 American coming-of-age film written and directed by Patrick Read Johnson and produced by Fred Roos and Gary Kurtz. It stars John Francis Daley as a teenage director living in Wadsworth, Illinois, and his excitement for the premiere of Star Wars on May 25, 1977.

== Plot ==
Eight-year-old Pat sees the film 2001: A Space Odyssey and it creates a lifelong desire in him to create special effects movies, starting in his backyard with an 8mm camera. His father initially supports his activities, but eventually leaves the family. He makes his own sequels to Planet of the Apes, Jaws, and Space: 1999 all while dreaming of one day making it big in Hollywood himself.

As a high school senior, Pat has yet to finish any of his films, much to the frustration of his best friend Bill Holmes, who is also his filmmaking partner and lead actor. Pat and Bill struggle to fit in at school but Bill's sometime girlfriend Robin enjoys their unique friendship. Pat is obsessed with 2001 and his obsession leads him to learn all he can about special effects artist and filmmaker Douglas Trumbull, whom he mostly knows about by reading magazines like American Cinematographer.

Pat works on a new film about an alien visiting his small town and his difficulty fitting in. He meets Linda, who works in his school cafeteria, while she is reading Arthur C. Clarke's 2001 novel. He takes it as a sign, and they begin dating, but it is unclear if she's a better fit for him than Robin. Linda has a protective friend named Tony who doesn't like Pat or Bill.

Pat's mother calls American Cinematographer editor Herb Lightman, who reluctantly agrees to host Pat on his visit to Hollywood and try to introduce him to Trumbull. They visit Trumbull's studio, where they stumble upon Steven Spielberg and his team shooting effects for Close Encounters of the Third Kind. Pat is overwhelmed by Spielberg and he ends up wandering around the studio. He recognizes several people from his magazines and is awestruck by seeing them work. As they leave the studio, they run into Trumbull, who doesn't have time for more than a "hello".

Lightman takes Pat to another studio – Industrial Light & Magic – where the technicians there are trying to wrap up the effects shots for Star Wars. John Dykstra gives him a full tour, explaining the models and sets and his tour ends with a screening of an unfinished work print of Star Wars.

Pat returns home, to the disappointment of his family that he failed to make inroads with any of the people he met. Pat has been enthralled by Star Wars, but fails to transfer his excitement to anyone back home. He counts down the days until its release, hoping that once it comes out everyone in his town will love the movie, and he won't feel as alone.

On the release date, May 25, 1977, a series of events cause Pat to miss each of the first day's showing of Star Wars, including a fight with Bill, taking Robin to the hospital, and losing his virginity to Linda – and then breaking up with her after she claims she slept with Tony while he was away. He has a showdown with Tony, and beats him up, only to learn Linda lied about sleeping with Tony so Pat would let her go and follow his dreams. He makes it to the theater in time for a midnight showing, only to learn that "In Theaters Everywhere" doesn't include the one in his town.

Two weeks later, Robin takes Pat to the theater, which is finally showing Star Wars, and the line to get in goes around the block. The finished film is everything he hoped it would be, and he packs up and leaves for California with the encouragement of his family and Bill.

== Cast ==
- John Francis Daley as Pat Johnson
- Austin Pendleton as Herb Lightman
- Colleen Camp as Janet Johnson
- Neil Flynn as Dr. Callahan
- Emmi Chen as Linda
- Steven Coulter as Bill
- Justin Mentell as Tony
- Christopher McLinden as Doug
- Tim Beringer as Eric Johnson
- Caitlin Barlow as Jenny
- Mike Markoff as Jock
- Darlene Benigno as Theatre Patron
- Katie Jeep as Robin Braden

== Production ==
Johnson began funding the project in 2001 and filming took place from 2004 to 2006. Additional shots and special effects were filmed in 2015, 2016, and over the following six years, making the film's production span a total of 18 years.

The film was first known as 5-25-77; the title was then changed to '77. In 2012, the title was reverted to 5-25-77.

It is also the final film appearance of actor Justin Mentell, released seven years after his death on February 1, 2010.

== Release ==
In 2013, parts of the film were exhibited as a work-in-progress at the TIFF Next Wave film festival.

The film's official premiere was on May 22, 2017, at the Genesee Theatre in Waukegan, Illinois. A short theatrical run followed. On December 25, 2020, its director announced on his Facebook and Twitter pages that it would be available to stream, buy and see in select theaters on May 25, 2021, but the release was postponed. On May 25, 2022, MVD Entertainment announced that they had acquired the film's worldwide rights and that it would be released in the fall of 2022.

The final version debuted at the Skyline Indie Film Fest in Winchester, Virginia on September 8, 2022. It made its L.A. debut at the DTLA Film Festival a week later on September 15, and began a run on 100 screens on September 23. It was released on DVD and Blu-ray on November 22, 2022.
