= Chinese Handcuffs =

1989 novel by Chris Crutcher

- First edition
- Author: Chris Crutcher
- Cover artist: James McMullan
- Language: English
- Genre: Young adult
- Publisher: Greenwillow Press
- Publication date: 1989
- Publication place: United States
- Media type: Print
- Pages: 296 pp
- ISBN: 0-68-808345-5
- LC Class: PZ7.C89 Ch 2004

Chinese Handcuffs is a 1989 young adult novel by young adult writer Chris Crutcher. The story alternates between the two main characters, Dillon and Jennifer, both high school athletes dealing with personal issues. The majority of Dillon’s story is told via a journal he keeps, writing about the death of his older brother.

== Plot ==
Dillon is struggling over the suicide of his younger brother Preston. He begins to run marathons to help cope with this loss. He remains friends with his brother's girlfriend, Stacy, and befriends Jennifer, the star of the high school's basketball team.

It is later revealed that the reason behind Preston's suicide is because he raped a young girl at a bar, and because he discovered Stacy was pregnant with his child. Dillon was witness to his suicide, and feels very responsible for his death.

It is also revealed that Jennifer has been sexually abused by her biological father and her step dad. She is afraid to tell that her step dad is abusing her because of threats he has made about the family dog and her sister. She eventually tells Dillon, who promises he will not tell anyone. She later tries to commit suicide because she can no longer stay in the family, and Dillon saves her and gets help for her. Dillon is able to get photographic evidence of the abuse, and uses this to force Jennifer's step dad to leave the state.

Because Dillon helped save Jennifer, he is able to move on from Preston's death.

=== Symbols ===
One of the biggest reoccurring event is "Stacy's Chinese Handcuffs." As children, Stacy explains to Dillon that Chinese Handcuffs will not release his fingers if he tries to pull away, but will only let him go if he pushes his fingers further into the trap. She tells him that this is supposedly a metaphor for life. It becomes apparent as the book goes on that because Dillon is continuing writing to Preston, that he and Preston are trapped together in Chinese Handcuffs. In his last letter to Preston, Dillon states that he is pushing his fingers into the trap to let himself go. This also ties into the main theme of the book.

== Awards ==
- ALA Best Book for Young Adults
- ALA Best of the Best Books for Young Adults
- 1991 South Dakota YARP Best Books List
