= Justin Mentell =

American artist and actor (1982–2010)

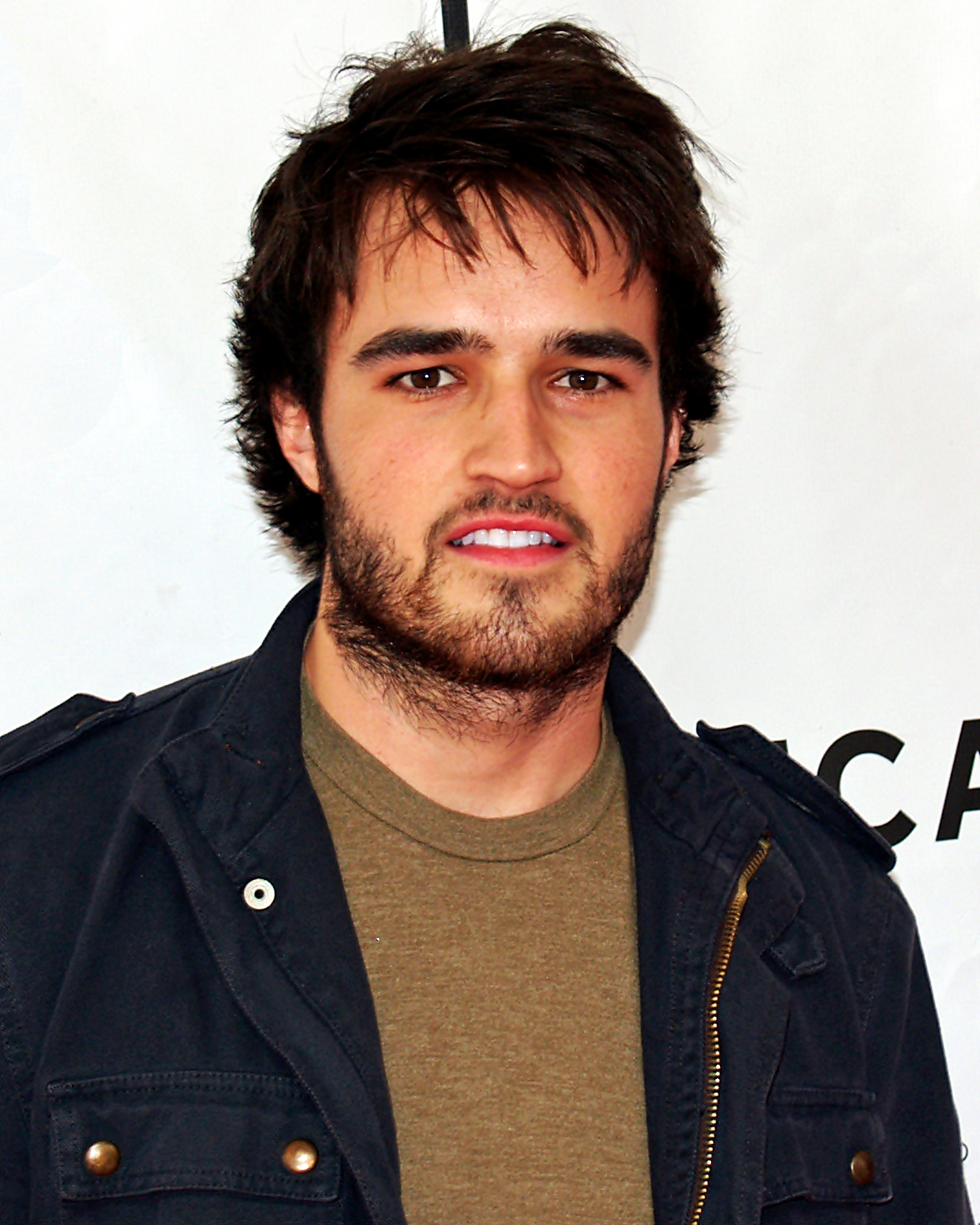
- Mentell in April 2007
- Born: Justin Michael Mentell; December 16, 1982; Austin, Texas, U.S.
- Died: February 1, 2010 (aged 27); Mineral Point, Wisconsin, U.S.
- Occupation: Actor
- Years active: 1986–2010 (stage); 2004–2010 (film)

Justin Michael Mentell (December 16, 1982 – February 1, 2010) was an American artist and actor. He was known for his role as Garrett Wells on Boston Legal, which earned him a Screen Actors Guild Award nomination. He died in a traffic collision in Iowa County, Wisconsin.

== Life and career ==
Justin Michael Mentell was born on December 16, 1982, in Austin, Texas. He made his stage debut at three years of age as an orphan in Miss Liberty, and went on to appear in local theater productions, among them the musical Peter Pan, in which he portrayed one of the Lost Boys. After the family moved to Waukegan, Illinois, Mentell joined the Northbrook Children's Theater, where he continued to perform on stage. He also took up speed skating, placing third at the Junior Olympics and eventually becoming a member of the U.S. Speedskating's junior national long track team.

Mentell attended Northern Illinois University (NIU), where he majored in acting. He appeared in several plays there, including Balm in Gilead, The Play's the Thing, and Never the Sinner. During his sophomore year, he trained at the Moscow Art Theatre, as part of a summer exchange program sponsored by NIU's School of Theater and Dance.

At NIU he also appeared in several independent films, including At the Still Point, for which he received the Golden Reel Award for Best Actor at its 2005 Film Festival. He also appeared in "Gotham III" in 2004 and used his speed-skating skills to land a role in the 2004 roller derby comedy Roll Bounce.

Mentell was a member of the cast of television dramedy Boston Legal as Garrett Wells. He played the role from the first episode of season 2 through February 2006. His 2009 projects included Death Walks the Streets and the Jerry Bruckheimer-produced live-action/animated family feature G-Force for Walt Disney Pictures, which was released in theaters July 24, 2009.

The film 5-25-77, which initially premiered at the Genesee Theatre in May 2017 before having its wide release five years later in 2022, is Mentell's final film appearance.

== Death ==
On February 1, 2010, Mentell died in a car crash near Hollandale, Wisconsin. According to the Iowa County Sheriff's Office, Mentell was pronounced dead at the scene around 9 a.m. The accident was said to have taken place around 3:30 a.m. after his 2005 Jeep left the roadway on Highway 39, went down an embankment and struck two trees. One unconfirmed possibility is that he had fallen asleep at the wheel, though his Jeep was not discovered until later in the day by a passing farmer who alerted authorities. He was not wearing a seat belt and was ejected from the vehicle.

== Filmography ==
Film
Year	Title	Role	Notes
2004	Gotham, IL	Johnny Wall	Short
2005	At the Still Point	Nate	Short
2005	Roll Bounce	Skater	Uncredited
2005–2006	Boston Legal	Garrett Wells	16 episodes Nominated – Screen Actors Guild Award for Outstanding Performance by an Ensemble in a Comedy Series (2006; shared with the cast)
2007	Palo Alto	Ryan	
2009	G-Force	Terrell	
2017	5-25-77	Tony	(Posthumous release; final film role)
