= Big Girls Don't Cry (2026 film) =

2026 film by Paloma Schneideman

- Directed by: Paloma Schneideman
- Written by: Paloma Schneideman
- Produced by: Vicky Pope; Thomas Coppell
- Starring: Ani Palmer; Noah Taylor; Rain Spencer; Beatrix Wolfe
- Cinematography: Maria Ines Manchego
- Edited by: Chia Chi-Hsu; Cushla Dillon
- Music by: Cam Ballantyne
- Production companies: POP Film; Tomorrow, Rain
- Distributed by: Madman Entertainment
- Release date: January 24, 2026 (Sundance Film Festival)
- Running time: 99 minutes
- Country: New Zealand
- Language: English

Big Girls Don't Cry is a 2026 New Zealand drama film directed by Paloma Schneideman. The film premiered at the 2026 Sundance Film Festival.

== Cast ==
- Ani Palmer as Sid
- Noah Taylor as Leo
- Rain Spencer as Freya
- Beatrix Rain Wolfe as Lana
- Ngataitangirua Hita as Tia
- Sophia Kirkwood Smith as Stevie
- Tara Canton as Adele
- Ian Blackburn as Kyle
- Emile Boyle as Andy
- Caleb Cameron Lee as Willy
- Poroaki Merritt-McDonald as Diggy

== Production ==
Filming for Big Girls Don't Cry took place in Auckland, New Zealand and Ōmaha, New Zealand during March - May 2025 and marked Schneideman's feature film directorial debut. Of the film, Schneideman stated that she wanted the film to feel discomforting because she believed that "there was a real responsibility for young women or young queer folk to not look away or not avoid those more difficult aspects of coming-of-age". She also chose to have the film end on an ambiguous note, as the directors wanted viewers to project themselves onto the situation instead of telling the viewer how they should feel.

== Release ==
Big Girls Don't Cry had its world premiere in the World Dramatic Competition at the 2026 Sundance Film Festival on January 24, 2026. It then screened at 2026 South by Southwest Film & TV Festival as a 'Festival Favorite', BFI Flare: London LGBTIQ+ Film Festival as a 'Special Presentation', and TIFF Next Wave in Toronto, Canada.

In New Zealand & Australia, the film was the opening night film of the 2026 Whānau Mārama New Zealand International Film Festival, and screened as part of the Bright Horizons Competition at the Melbourne International Film Festival in Australia in August 2026.

== Reception ==
On the review aggregator website Rotten Tomatoes, 100% of 31 critics' reviews are positive, with an average rating of 7.9/10.

Out Magazine praised Big Girls Don't Cry, citing Ani Palmer's acting as a highlight. RogerEbert.com's Marya E. Gates also praised the film, noting that "what really makes this film special is the way Schneideman subtly indicates how painful it was in that era to grow up queer without any real support system, even if you never experienced any actual violence."

=== Awards ===
- World Cinema Dramatic Award at the Sundance Film Festival (2026, nominated)
- Grand Prix, Biarritz Film Festival - Nouvelles Vagues (2026, won)
- Asia Pacific Screen Award for Best Youth Film at the 19th Asia Pacific Screen Awards.
