= Spaced Invaders =

1990 film by Patrick Read Johnson

- Theatrical release poster
- Directed by: Patrick Read Johnson
- Written by: Patrick Read Johnson; Scott Lawrence Alexander
- Produced by: Luigi Cingolani
- Starring: Douglas Barr; Royal Dano; Ariana Richards
- Cinematography: James L. Carter
- Edited by: Seth Gaven; Daniel Gross
- Music by: David Russo
- Production companies: Touchstone Pictures; Smart Egg Pictures
- Distributed by: Buena Vista Pictures Distribution
- Release date: April 27, 1990
- Running time: 100 minutes
- Country: United States
- Language: English
- Budget: $3 million
- Box office: $15.4 million

Spaced Invaders is a 1990 American science fiction comedy directed by Patrick Read Johnson and starring Douglas Barr, Royal Dano, and Ariana Richards.

The film's title is a pun on the classic video game Space Invaders.

== Plot ==
The space armada from Mars fights an interstellar war against their long-time enemy, the Arcturans. The Martian armada is sent into battle by Enforcer Drones, tasked to keep the Martian soldiers in line, despite objections by some that it won't work. Meanwhile, the incompetent crew of a small spaceship from the Martian "Civilian Asteroid Patrol" intercepts a distress signal from the fleet. Said signal is followed by a Halloween rebroadcast of Orson Welles' 1938 The War of the Worlds radio dramatization.

Mistaking this for a real invasion—and not wanting to miss out on the glory of "kicking some Earthling butt"—the CAP crew lands their ship in the tiny community of Big Bean, Illinois; there they proceed with their "invasion" of the planet. The ship's smart-mouthed pilot Blaznee, who has more common sense than the others, doesn't think it's a good idea. He is ignored by the rest of the crew: Captain Bipto, an overzealous optimist; Lieutenant Giggywig, an ambitious and hot-headed know-it-all; Dr. Ziplock, the careful and calculating science officer; and the alternately-overeager-and-timid Corporal Pez. The CAP crew searches for the (nonexistent) Martian invasion fleet which they believe has already landed. Because it's Halloween, everyone assumes the Martians are kids in exceptionally-well-made costumes. Eventually, though, a few locals realize the truth. Among them is the town sheriff (Barr), his daughter Kathy (Richards), and an elderly farmer named Wrenchmuller (Royal Dano), on whose farm the Martians have crash-landed. The sheriff finds out about the aliens when his deputy records their ship doing 3,000 mph.

The deputy tracks down the ship in order to give the occupants tickets for having no license, registration, headlights, taillight, or wheels, and going 2,945 miles over the posted limit. Kathy discovers the aliens when they join a group of trick-or-treating kids. She befriends the Martians' "Scout-in-a-Can", a small robot which folds up into a sphere. Mr. Wrenchmuller tries to cash in on the Martians' existence in order to save his farm. Captain Bipto gets hit by a truck and turns a gas station attendant named Vern into his robotic slave. Giggywig, Ziplock, and Pez try to blow up the town's Co-Op and instead just heat up a silo of corn kernels, creating a gigantic hot-air popcorn-popper. Kathy's new friend, a boy named Brian, captures Blaznee by hitting him with a trashcan lid. He then tries to help the alien repair his ship. Attempting to blow up the ship, Wrenchmuller is trapped in a paralyzing beam. The desperate Martians try to blow up the Earth using the D.O.D. (Doughnut Of Destruction), but it falls apart instead. The Martians finally realize they made a horrible mistake.

Things get worse when the ship's "hyperdriver" goes into meltdown, threatening to create a black-hole. Their ship's Enforcer Drone won't let them leave, making things even more complicated. The humans succeed in destroying the Enforcer Drone with dynamite, then offer to help the grateful "invaders" return to space. As an unintentional gift, the Martians jettison their ship's sewage tank while flying over Wrenchmuller's field.

The Martian manure rejuvenates the drought-stricken farmland while turning the regular green beans (for which the town is famous) into gigantic, 6-foot-tall pods; this enables Wrenchmuller to save the town from greedy real-estate developers. As the Martians head home, Captain Bipto suggests they go to Arcturus to "help torture prisoners"; this idea is promptly vetoed by the rest of the crew.

== Cast ==
- Douglas Barr as Sheriff Sam Hoxly
- Royal Dano as Mr. Wrenchmuller
- Ariana Richards as Kathy Hoxly
- Gregg Berger as Steve W. Klembecker
- Fred Applegate as Deputy Russell Pillsbury
- Wayne Alexander as Vern Pillsbury / Verndroid
- J.J. Anderson as Brian Hampton
- Patrika Darbo as Mrs. Vanderspool
- Tonya Lee Williams as Ernestine Hampton
- Kevin Thompson as Blaznee
- Jimmy Briscoe as Captain Bipto
- Tony Cox as Corporal Pez
- Debbie Lee Carrington as Dr. Ziplock
- Tommy Madden as Lieutenant Giggywig

=== Voices ===
- Kevin Thompson as Blaznee
- Jeff Winkless as Captain Bipto
- Tony Pope as Corporal Pez
- Joe Alaskey as Dr. Ziplock
- Bruce Lanoil as Lieutenant Giggywig
- Patrick Read Johnson as Commander / Enforcer Drone
- Kirk Thatcher as Shortstuff

== Production ==
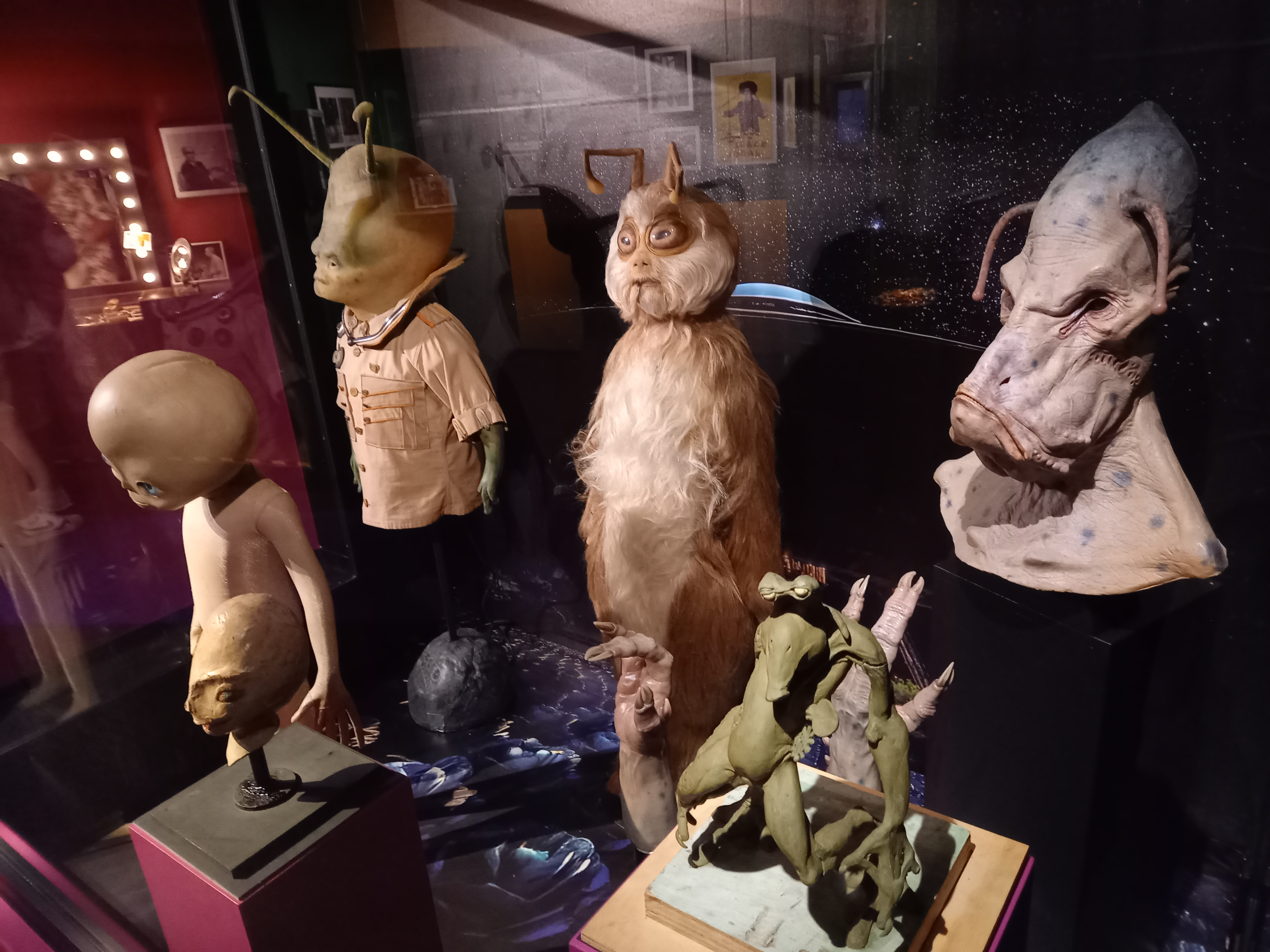
A model of Martian, alongside other movie extraterrestrials from Men in Black film series and Close Encounters of the Third Kind (1977).

The film was initially titled Martians!!!. Patrick Read Johnson wrote the script in April 1988 and upon the script reaching Smart Egg Pictures with the company approving production and assigning Johnson as director very quickly to the point shooting was commencing by November of that year and were already discussing the possibility of sequels before the film's release. The characters and mannerisms of Blaznee, Captain Bipto, and Corporal Pez were modeled off of Jack Nicholson, James T. Kirk, and Jerry Lewis respectively.

== Reception ==
Film historian Leonard Maltin gave the movie 1.5 out of 4 stars, declaring it "Criminally overlong...It all makes you wonder why Orson Welles couldn't get financing for decades, while pictures like this one are produced by the truckload." Roger Ebert gave the same score. The film has gained a cult following.

== TV series ==
In November 1997, a live-action TV series was being developed by Gullane Entertainment.
