= Angus (film) =

- Theatrical release poster
- Directed by: Patrick Read Johnson
- Written by: Jill Gordon
- Based on: "A Brief Moment in the Life of Angus Bethune" by Chris Crutcher
- Produced by: Dawn Steel; Charles Roven
- Starring: George C. Scott; Chris Owen; Ariana Richards; Anna Thomson; Charlie Talbert; Kathy Bates
- Cinematography: Alexander Gruszynski
- Edited by: Janice Hampton
- Music by: David E. Russo
- Production companies: BBC; Atlas Entertainment; Turner Pictures; Syalis D.A. Tele München Gruppe; Quality Entertainment
- Distributed by: New Line Cinema (United States); Entertainment Film Distributors (United Kingdom); Concorde Filmverleih (Germany); UGC Fox Distribution (France)
- Release date: September 15, 1995
- Running time: 87 minutes
- Countries: United States; United Kingdom; Germany; France
- Language: English
- Budget: $1.5 million
- Box office: $4.8 million

Angus is a 1995 coming-of-age comedy film directed by Patrick Read Johnson. The film stars George C. Scott, Chris Owen, Ariana Richards, Anna Thomson, Charlie Talbert in his film debut as the eponymous character, and Kathy Bates. Angus is based on the short story "A Brief Moment in the Life of Angus Bethune" by Chris Crutcher, from his collection Athletic Shorts: Six Short Stories.

It is mostly filmed in Owatonna, Minnesota at Owatonna Senior High School.

== Plot ==
In Minnesota, 14-year-old boy Angus Bethune, despite his talents in football and science, holds deep insecurities. Since kindergarten, he has been harassed by cruel Rick Sanford and his cohorts for not being "normal". His only friend is Troy Wedberg, another social outcast. Angus has feelings for Melissa Lefevre, a cheerleader who is dating Rick. Tired of Rick's abuse, Angus applies to a magnet school where he hopes to be free of the bullying. Well aware of Angus' feelings for Melissa, Rick rigs a school election so that Angus and Melissa will dance together in the upcoming Freshman Winter Ball as King and Queen, respectively. After the stunt, the principal forbids Angus to lay a hand on Rick, or he would be expelled and lose his chance to go to the magnet school.

To prepare for the dance, Angus gets help from Troy, his mother Meg, and his narcoleptic grandfather Ivan. Angus takes dancing lessons with Madame Rulenska, but the lessons go badly. Despite Angus' request for a black tuxedo, Ivan purchases a plum suit and tells him he can be normal and an individual at the same time. Ivan reasons that running away to another school will not solve anything and that he needs to stand up to Rick.

Rick and his friends eventually kidnap Troy and ask him for anything that would embarrass Angus at the Winter Ball. Troy refuses to help them, but ends up breaking his arm as he tries to get away. Meanwhile, Angus helps Ivan prepare for his wedding to his fiancée April. On the day of the wedding, Ivan dies. Distraught, Angus opts to stay home for some days.

Out of fear, Troy gives Rick a videotape containing footage of Angus practicing his dancing with an inflatable doll while confessing his feelings for Melissa. When Troy visits Angus to offer his condolences, an argument ensues. Angus asserts he will not go to the Winter Ball because he does not want to be humiliated by Rick again and needs to cope with Ivan's death.

Later that week, Angus receives a box from April containing the plum suit that he had earlier rejected. In that moment, Angus realizes Ivan was right: he needs to stand up for himself and face Rick, or nothing will change. The night of the dance is the same time an interviewer from the magnet school comes to Angus' home. Angus tells the interviewer of a science project he was working on which is akin to Ivan's ideas, then afterwards marches to the dance in the school gymnasium wearing the plum suit. Troy tries to warn him that Rick is planning a terrible prank, but Angus refuses to back down and goes inside, meeting with Melissa for the first time. Before they can dance as King and Queen, Rick plays Troy's videotape on the monitors, prompting laughter from students. A humiliated Melissa runs out in tears. Angus follows her, infuriated at Troy for his betrayal.

Angus apologizes to Melissa, who reveals her disgust with Rick and confesses to Angus that she is bulimic. Angus learns that Melissa likes him more than Rick because he is kind and respectful of others. Finding common ground, they go back inside and dance, with Melissa helping him out with some of the steps. When Rick scolds Melissa, Angus comes to her defense. Rick punches Angus, breaking his nose and sending him crashing through a table. Angus defiantly rises to his feet and repeatedly pushes Rick until he falls to the ground, saying no matter how many times Rick knocks him down, he will always get back up. The students eventually applaud Angus and even Rick's friends abandon him. Melissa dances with Angus again and Troy enacts revenge on Rick by breaking his nose with his cast.

Melissa asks Angus to walk her home, and kisses him on the cheek. Angus realizes he does not have to run away anymore, but is pleased that he was accepted to the magnet school. Rick is suspended for his prank and for breaking Troy's arm. Rick's popularity with the other students also suffers since Angus stood up to him and thus, they have no reason to fear him anymore.

== Cast ==
- Charlie Talbert as Angus Bethune
  - Aaron Siefers as Angus (age 11)
  - Grant Hoover as Angus (age 8)
  - Michael Wesley as Angus (age 5)
  - Cameron Royds as Baby Angus
- George C. Scott as Grandpa Ivan Bethune
- Kathy Bates as Meg Bethune
- Rita Moreno as Madame Rulenska
- Chris Owen as Troy Wedberg
  - Bryan Warloe as Troy (age 8)
- Lawrence Pressman as Principal Metcalf
- Ariana Richards as Melissa Lefevre
  - Bethany Richards as Melissa (age 11)
- Anna Thompson as April Thomas
- James Van Der Beek as Rick Sandford
  - Steven Hartman as Rick (age 11)
  - Michael McLeod as Rick (age 8)
  - Tanner Lee Prairie as Rick (age 5)
- Wesley Mann as Mr. Kessler
- Robert Curtis Brown as Alexander
- Kevin Connolly as Andy

== Production ==
The film was originally developed by Dawn Steel's Steel Pictures for Touchstone Pictures in 1991, under the direction of Jon Turteltaub, but subsequently put into turnaround in 1993, and was picked up by the newly-formed Atlas Entertainment, an affiliate of production company Turner Pictures. Patrick Read Johnson was hired to direct the film to replace Turteltaub.

== Reception ==
=== Box office ===
Angus was released theatrically in North America on Friday, September 15, 1995, on 1,154 screens, debuting in eighth place amidst a crowded box office. It opened against Hackers and Clockers, while To Wong Foo, Thanks for Everything! Julie Newmar, Dangerous Minds, The Usual Suspects, and Braveheart were still having a strong showing in box office numbers. To Wong Foo, Thanks for Everything! Julie Newmar ultimately won the weekend with $6,544,960 as it expanded to 1,448 screens.

In its second weekend, Sept 22–24, the film slipped to twelfth place with $1,314,839 from 1,156 screens, its widest release (a percentage drop of 31.3%). Se7en opened that weekend and won the box office with $13,949,807 from 2,441 screens.

=== Critical response ===
Angus has a 67% "fresh" rating on review aggregator site Rotten Tomatoes, based on 18 reviews. Though some critics considered the film's underdog story familiar and formulaic, others commended Angus for its accurate portrayal of high school life compared to similar films about adolescence, since it takes a critical look at obesity, bullying, self-esteem, and high school inclusiveness, while highlighting the importance of self-acceptance.

Godfrey Cheshire of Variety wrote, "Jill Gordon’s script is emotionally ingenuous and pleasingly to-the-point, while Patrick Read Johnson’s skillful, unpretentious direction involves some fine work by cast’s appealing youngsters, especially Charlie Talbert as Angus and James Van Der Beek as Rick.” Peter Stack of the San Francisco Chronicle also reviewed the film positively, writing, "Slight and contrived as it is...[Angus] has a genuine warm spot for the outsider or socially awkward misfit -- and that covers just about everybody at one time or another.”

Janet Maslin of The New York Times opined “‘Angus' is an easygoing if predictable alternative to more gimmicky teen-age fare", adding "Mr. Scott and Ms. Bates help dignify the film without condescending to their material, and help bring home the universality of its familiar ideas about fitting in.”

Critic Emanuel Levy gave the film a "C", but conceded Angus was "played by newcomer Charles M. Talbert with a certain charm." Roger Ebert awarded the film three out of four stars and concluded "Charlie Talbert is a good casting choice for Angus, because he isn't a 'sort of' fat kid, like those models in the King Size catalog who look about 12 pounds overweight. He is fat. But he is also smart, likable, resilient and engaging. And he has the gift of deflecting his shortcomings with humor."

== Home media ==
The film was released on VHS on August 27, 1996. It was later shown in an edited-for-TV version on Turner-owned cable television stations.

On December 17, 2009, Warner Archive released the film on DVD.

In the years since Angus’ release, the film rights have been sold by New Line Cinema and are now privately owned. Responding to a fan about whether Angus will ever be reissued as a DVD or Blu-ray with the director’s cut version, Patrick Read Johnson said it would be a matter of significant fan support, in addition to recovering the original sound and film.

== Soundtrack ==
Angus: Music from the Motion Picture

Soundtrack album to the film Angus by Various artists
- Released: August 22, 1995
- Recorded: March 1993–May 1995
- Genres: Alternative rock; punk rock
- Length: 34:48
- Label: Warner Bros. Records

Singles from Angus: Music from the Motion Picture
- 1. "J.A.R." Released: July 10, 1995

Professional ratings
Review scores
Source	Rating
Allmusic	3/5 stars

The soundtrack includes the Weezer song "You Gave Your Love to Me Softly", which was used in place of the track "Wanda (You're My Only Love)" which had been written specifically for the film.

Green Day contributed the song "J.A.R. (Jason Andrew Relva)", which was originally an unreleased track from the band's Dookie sessions. Billie Joe Armstrong co-produced "Back to You" by the Riverdales with producer Mass Giorgini.

The music supervisors for the film were Elliot Cahn and Jeff Saltzman, who at the time managed Green Day and The Muffs.

Angus: Music from the Motion Picture
No.	Title	Artist	Length
1.	"J.A.R."	Green Day	2:52
2.	"Jack Names the Planets"	Ash	3:13
3.	"Enough"	Dance Hall Crashers	3:01
4.	"Kung Fu"	Ash	2:17
5.	"Back to You"	Riverdales	3:33
6.	"Mrs. You and Me"	Smoking Popes	3:34
7.	"You Gave Your Love to Me Softly"	Weezer	1:59
8.	"Ain't That Unusual"	Goo Goo Dolls	3:18
9.	"Funny Face"	The Muffs	3:21
10.	"White Homes"	Tilt	2:09
11.	"Deep Water"	Pansy Division	2:10
12.	"Am I Wrong"	Love Spit Love	3:34
Total length:			34:48
