= Patrick Read Johnson =

American film director

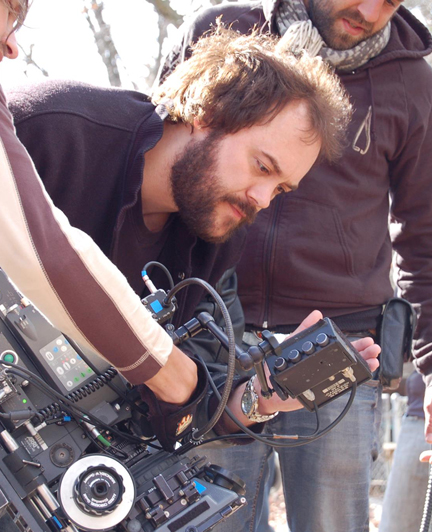
- Patrick Read Johnson, on the set of 5-25-77
- Born: May 7, 1962 (age 64); Wadsworth, Illinois, United States
- Occupations: Film director, scriptwriter, film producer, actor, visual effects artist
- Years active: 1980–present

Patrick Read Johnson (born May 7, 1962) is an American filmmaker, special effects artist and screenwriter. Born in Wadsworth, Illinois, he is best known for his directorial work on the films Spaced Invaders, Angus, Baby's Day Out, The Genesis Code, and 5-25-77. He also has written and produced such films as Dragonheart.

== Career ==
Starting out in the field of practical special effects and models, Johnson was one of the first people outside of Industrial Light and Magic to see Star Wars (albeit in an incomplete form) as chronicled in his semi-autobiographical film 5-25-77. He first saw the film during Spring Break, sometime between late March and early April 1977, when ILM was scrambling to complete VFX shots. He had also visited the set of Close Encounters of the Third Kind at Future General Corporation a few days before and found Douglas Trumbull's work to be "engineered, intimidating and mature" compared to John Dykstra's "shooting-from-the-hip" style.

Johnson ascended into mainstream Hollywood filmmaking following the modest success of Spaced Invaders, invited by John Hughes to work on his adaptation of Dennis the Menace, and then later, the comedy Baby's Day Out. Baby's Day Out was tremendously popular in South Asia, including India, Pakistan, Sri Lanka and Bangladesh. In India, it was played at the largest theater in Calcutta for over a year.

He also wrote the fantasy film Dragonheart, which spawned a franchise. He proposed the idea for the film to producer Raffaella De Laurentiis. Johnson described it as "The Skin Game with a dragon in it...or Butch Cassidy and the Sundance Dragon", and that he wanted "the idea of a dragon and a knight conning villages for money" because he thought that the concept was "not only funny, but kind of sweet".

Up until 2021 Johnson served as a filmmaking instructor at the University of North Carolina School of the Arts.

=== 5-25-77 ===
Johnson began developing 5-25-77 in 1999 after he met Gary Kurtz. In 2001, Johnson began seeking funding for 5-25-77, and didn't start shooting the film until 2004. An incomplete "preview cut" was exhibited in 2007 at Star Wars Celebration IV and at the Hamptons International Film Festival in 2008, where 5-25-77 won the Heineken Red Star Award.

On May 25, 2012, the 35th anniversary of the release of Star Wars, Johnson began a cross-country road trip in his 1975 Ford Pinto to attract the funding needed to finish the film's remaining post-production work. Johnson spent the summer of 2012 test-screening 5-25-77, his trip also becoming the subject of a documentary called Hearts of Dorkness, by filmmaker Morgan Flores.

In 2013, the TIFF Next Wave film festival invited Johnson to show 5-25-77 as a "work in progress", the attention from the festival Johnson attributed to the bid of his promotional tour the summer before.

In 2017, it was announced Johnson had completed the film and that it would receive a limited theatrical release on May 25.

== Filmography ==
=== Films ===
==== Filmmaking credits ====
Title	Year	Director	Writer	Executive producer	Notes
Spaced Invaders	1990	Yes	Yes		
Baby's Day Out	1994	Yes			
Angus	1995	Yes			
Dragonheart	1996		Story	Yes	
The Genesis Code	2010	Yes			
5-25-77	2022	Yes	Yes	Yes	Also wrote title music

==== Acting credits ====
Title	Year	Role(s)	Notes
Spaced Invaders	1990	Commander / Enforcer Drone (voice)	
Joey's Last Wish	2014	Awards Presenter	Shorts
The Roma Project	2015	Dr. Towns	Shorts
Gilded	2016	Steven Henderson	Shorts
Telemetry	2016	NASA Official	Shorts
5-25-77	2022	Dr. Johnson	

==== Technical credits ====
Title	Year	Credits	Notes
Deal of the Century	1983	Model maker	Uncredited
2010: The Year We Make Contact	1984	Miniatures crew	Uncredited
An American Tail	1986	Miniature model maker	
King Kong Lives	1986	Crew leader: special effects miniatures	
Dead Heat	1988	Second unit director / special effects / video graphic animation / Songwriter (song Deat Heat)	
Bill & Ted's Excellent Adventure	1989	Miniature construction: Perpetual Motion Pictures	
Warlock	1989	Visual effects coordinator / miniature construction: Perpetual Motion Pictures	
Dark Country	2009	Visual effects producer: Moonwalker	

=== Television ===
==== Filmmaking credits ====
Title	Year	Director	Writer	Producer	Notes
Dinosaurs	1991	Yes			Episode: "When Food Goes Bad"
When Good Ghouls Go Bad	2001	Yes	Yes		Television movie
LazyTown	2004			Supervising	2 episodes
Starsailor	TBA	Yes	Yes	Yes	

==== Acting credits ====
Title	Year	Role	Notes
Masterpiece	2022	Jac's Dad	1 episode

==== Technical credits ====
Title	Year	Credits	Notes
V	1983	Mothership miniature	Episode: "Part I", uncredited
Amazing Stories	1985	Model maker	Episode: "The Mission", uncredited

=== Music videos ===
Performer	Title	Year	Director	Producer	Songwriter	Notes
Alan Parsons	I Can't Get There from Here	2019	Yes		Yes	Related with 5-25-77
Alan Parsons	As Lights Fall	2019	Yes	Yes		
