= Whale Talk =

2001 book by Chris Crutcher

- Author: Chris Crutcher
- Language: English
- Genre: Young adult novel
- Publisher: Greenwillow Books (HarperCollins)
- Publication date: 2001
- Publication place: United States
- Media type: Print (Paperback)
- Pages: 220 pp
- ISBN: 0-440-22938-3
- OCLC: 51099093
- Preceded by: Ironman
- Followed by: The Sledding Hill

Whale Talk is a 2001 novel by young adult writer Chris Crutcher. It is narrated in the first person by the quick-witted, sarcastic, and athletic "T.J." Jones, an adopted Asian-African-European-American teenager living in Cutter, Washington, a fictional location in the Pacific Northwest's Inland Empire, set about 50 miles outside of Spokane. The novel focuses on how T. J. jumbles together a shabby swim team of student underdogs in order to aggravate and shame his high school's elitist athletics program.

== Plot summary ==
The biological son of a white mother and a half-black, half-Japanese father, The Tao Jones—known as T. J.—lives with his loving, adoptive white family in the nearly all-white town of Cutter, Washington. T. J.'s adoptive mother, Abby, is a child-abuse lawyer, and his adoptive father, John Paul, is a community volunteer and guardian ad litem, who is still haunted by his youth, when he accidentally killed a child after a one-night stand with the child's mother.

At Cutter High School, T. J. is a physically impressive senior who has refused to join any sports teams as a form of anger management, due to his anger issues since early childhood. His non-involvement irritates much of the faculty, who pride themselves on the physical achievements of their students, displaying favoritism toward their star athletes, such as Mike Barbour, a vicious bully. T. J. often finds Barbour harassing Chris Coughlin, an intellectually disabled student who must unfairly live in the wake of a widely admired older brother who died in a freak accident.

John Simet, an English teacher and friend of T. J.'s, wants to start a swim team to avoid direct coaching obligations. Simet convinces T. J. to be captain of the swim team and recruit its members, even though the school has no pool. Inspired to spite the school's pretentious athletics program and its glorification of bullies like Barbour, T. J. assembles a deliberately bizarre and motley crew of six swimmers, including the cognitively slow Chris; the obnoxiously sesquipedalian Dan Hole; the bodybuilder and musician Tay-Roy Kibble; the rude, antisocial, and one-legged Andy Mott; the completely nondescript Jackie Craig; and the obese and insecure Simon DeLong. T. J. hopes to have the whole team meet letterman requirements in order to embarrass the rest of the athletics program and their cherished school symbols. Simet sets the requirements as follows: at each meet, every member of the team must outdo his previous score. T. J.'s team uses the pool at a local gym as their training center, where T. J. eagerly employs a homeless, middle-aged gym-goer named Oliver Van Zandt to be the team's "interim coach Oliver" (I. C. O.), a title that earns him the nickname "Icko."

Meanwhile, an even more vicious friend of Mike Barbour, the racist and alcoholic Rich Marshall, is a die-hard alumnus of the school's athletics program. Rich has recently adopted the half-black illegitimate child of his young wife, Alicia, and renamed the little girl the whitest name he can think of: "Heidi." T. J., who maintains a close friendship with his childhood therapist, Georgia Brown, accidentally meets Heidi during one of her therapy sessions with Georgia. He thus learns of Heidi's brutal and racialized abuse at the hands of Rich. When Alicia and Heidi finally acquire a restraining order against Rich, the Joneses invite them to live in their home, but Rich begins stalking the house and making drunken threats.

T. J.'s swimmers gradually open up about the complexities of their personal lives, and all the members, except T. J. himself, meet the requirements to be lettermen. Shocked, the rest of the athletics program, led by Barbour and a prideful teacher, Coach Benson, challenge the requirements that Simet set for the team. T. J. negotiates a deal with Barbour, offering that if Barbour can outswim Chris, Benson will have justification to revoke the swim team's letters. Insulting Chris's intellect, Barbour agrees, but Chris easily wins the competition. The swim team celebrates, but also saddens with the knowledge that they will not be swimming together next year. T. J. mends some of this sorrow by inviting a few of the swimmers, as well as his father, John Paul, to form an underdog basketball team. The following year, the basketball players beat Rich Marshall's team in a highly attended tournament. Rich, further upset by Heidi's presence in the audience and seeing her cheering for the team that beats him, draws a gun and aims at her. John Paul instinctively jumps between them and takes the bullet when Rich fires. Before dying, John Paul reveals to T. J. the name of the woman whose child he killed in the driving accident all those years ago. Rich is imprisoned and, at John Paul's funeral, Barbour apologizes to T. J. for his inappropriate behavior in the past.

T. J. tracks down the woman John Paul mentioned only to discover that she bore a child from her one-night encounter with John Paul. The child—now an adult man named Kyle Couples—is therefore T. J.'s (adoptive) half-brother. T. J. and Kyle meet up, instantly connect, and promise to reunite over the summer.

== Themes ==
The novel, though written from T. J.'s first-person perspective largely with a sarcastically humorous tone, covers an array of serious and sometimes controversial social topics, including multiculturalism, adoption, domestic and child abuse, child protection, various forms of discrimination (ranging from racism to ableism), bullying, posttraumatic stress disorder, blended families, and gun violence.

== Awards ==
- 2002 - Washington State Book Award for outstanding books published by Washington authors
- 2021 - Phoenix Award honor book
