= Paloma Schneideman =

New Zealand filmmaker and musician

- Born: Auckland, New Zealand
- Other name: PollyHill
- Education: Mahurangi College, Victoria University of Wellington, Unitec Institute of Technology

Paloma Schneideman is a New Zealand film director, screenwriter, musician, and music producer. As a musician, she performs under the name PollyHill, releasing electronic and hip hop-influenced music as both a solo artist and collaborator. As a filmmaker, she is best known for writing and directing the coming-of-age drama Big Girls Don't Cry (2026), which premiered in the World Cinema Dramatic Competition at the Sundance Film Festival.

== Early life and education ==
Schneideman was born in Auckland, New Zealand, and spent her formative years in Matakana and Wellington. She attended Mahurangi College for secondary school and spent one year at Victoria University of Wellington before transferring to Unitec Institute of Technology in Auckland to study screen arts. She graduated from Unitec in 2014.

== Career ==
=== Music ===
Schneideman first gained recognition in the music industry as a filmmaker, directing the music videos for JessB’s "Set It Off" (2018) and "Bullseye" (2020) in collaboration with filmmaker and musician Shaquille Wasasala.

In 2019, Schneideman founded the music project PollyHill with Olli Jones, and the duo released the EP Greatest Hits in May 2020. Following its release, PollyHill became a solo project and released a second EP, Post Humorous, in May 2021. In 2023, PollyHill collaborated with musician Samara Alofa on the album AQUARIES. Produced by Schneideman, the album features her vocals on two of its eight tracks.

In 2023, PollyHill opened for Kae Tempest on their North Island tour and was named one of Rolling Stone AU/NZ's "Eight Kiwi Artists Tipped to Take Over." The following year, Schneideman received an APRA Professional Development Award, which supports the career development of songwriters and composers.

Schneideman is a self-taught producer and has described herself as "a lyricist first and foremost" before increasingly focusing on production. She has said that her background in filmmaking influences her songwriting, viewing both disciplines as "storytelling through different forms."

Critics have described her vocal delivery as calm and restrained, contrasting it with the emotional intensity of her lyrics. Schneideman has cited MF DOOM, Earl Sweatshirt, Björk, Arca, and James Blake as influences.

=== Film ===
Schneideman's film career began while she was a student at Unitec Institute of Technology. Her first short film, Mine (2015), was produced as her graduation project and nominated for Best International Short Film at the Inspiring Asia Micro Film Festival. Her later shorts include Memory Foam (2019), which screened as part of the New Zealand International Film Festival’s Short Connections programme, and Gate Crash (2023), which was a project in partnership with Toi Whakaari: New Zealand Drama School and selected for the New Zealand’s Best short film competition.

In 2022, Schneideman was selected to participate in A Wave in the Ocean, a filmmaking intensive led by Jane Campion and Philippa Campbell. Although she initially developed Big Girls Don't Cry as a short film, Campion and Campbell encouraged her to expand the project into a feature. The film became the first feature to emerge from the programme, with Campion serving as executive producer.

Drawing on her own experiences, Schneideman wrote Big Girls Don't Cry as a coming-of-age story exploring themes of identity, female sexuality, and queerness. She has said she made the film for her 14-year-old self and returned to the region where she grew up to film it.

Schneideman has said that coming-of-age films helped her understand herself growing up in rural New Zealand. She has cited Little Miss Sunshine as an early influence that inspired her to pursue filmmaking after seeing it at a local arthouse cinema. She has additionally cited Portrait of a Lady on Fire as an influence on her filmmaking, particularly its restrained portrayal of desire and use of silence. She has said she seeks to portray queer adolescence without reducing it to either tragedy or triumph, instead embracing its ambiguity.

== Personal life ==
Schneideman currently resides in Auckland, New Zealand.
