= Deadline (Crutcher novel) =

2007 novel by Chris Crutcher

- Author: Chris Crutcher
- Language: English
- Genre: Young adult novel
- Publisher: HarperCollins Publishers
- Publication date: 2007
- Publication place: United States
- Media type: Print (Paperback)
- Pages: 336 pp
- ISBN: 0-06-085091-4

Deadline is a young adult novel by young adult writer Chris Crutcher that was published in 2007. The story follows a high school senior named Ben Wolf, who is given one year to live after being diagnosed with a rare, incurable blood disease.

== Plot ==
Ben Wolf is an 18-year-old high school student from Trout, Idaho. He lives with his father, his mother, who is mentally ill, and his younger brother, Cody, who is a superb football player and attends the same high school as him.

During school one day, Doctor Wagner, the town doctor, diagnoses Ben with a rare, terminal blood disease. Doctor Wagner gives him only about a year to live and recommends that Ben seek treatment in a more urban part of the state. However, rather than following his doctor's advice, Ben decides he must pack “a lifetime of living” into one year and begins making radical changes for his senior year. Despite Doctor Wagner's disapproval, Ben chooses not to tell his parents about his disease. The only people who know about his disease are his doctor and his new therapist, Marla, a young psychologist from Boise.

As sports season begins, Ben decides to go out for football rather than doing cross country, which he has done consistently during his past high school years. At only 123 pounds, Ben is one of the smallest players on the team. The coach of the football team, who Ben maintains a friendly, almost familial relationship with, initially doubts his abilities but agrees to put him on the team nevertheless. In addition to trying out for football, Ben stirs controversy and debate every day in his government class to fight against his conservative, narrow-minded teacher. He also begins visiting the local drunk, Rudy McCoy, to help him clean up his act. Most importantly to Ben, however, he begins a relationship with his long-time crush, Dallas Suzuki.

== Reception ==
Publishers Weekly gave the book a starred review, calling it an "entertaining, thought-provoking tearjerker". Chris Shoemaker of School Library Journal also wrote a positive review, praising the characters. Kirkus Reviews was more negative, writing that the characters were "merely variations from the author's past works" and expressing disappointment in the heavy-handedness of the book's lessons.
