= Staying Fat for Sarah Byrnes =

Novel by Chris Crutcher

- Author: Chris Crutcher
- Language: English
- Genre: Young adult novel
- Published: 1993 (Greenwillow Books)
- Publication place: United States
- Media type: Print (hardback & paperback)
- Pages: 304 pp
- ISBN: 0-06-009489-3
- OCLC: 51946831

Staying Fat For Sarah Byrnes is a young adult fiction novel by Chris Crutcher. It has been recognized by the American Library Association as one of the "Best of the Best Books for Young Adults". It is also one of fifty books on Young Adult Library Services Association's The Ultimate Teen Bookshelf.

From the back of the 2003 Harper Teen edition:

Sarah Byrnes and Eric have been friends for years. When they were children, his fat and her terrible scars made them both outcasts. Later, although swimming slimmed Eric, she stayed his closest friend. Now Sarah Byrnes – the smartest, toughest person Eric has ever known – sits silent in a hospital. Eric must uncover the terrible secret she's hiding, before its dark currents pull them both under.

According to Crutcher's website, Staying Fat for Sarah Byrnes has been in the process of being adapted as a major motion picture since at least 2010.

== Plot summary ==
Eric “Moby” Calhoune's best friend Sarah Byrnes is catatonic, sitting in the mental ward of Sacred Heart Hospital. The staff there suggests that he recall some moments that may jog her memory and bring her back to reality. Eric and Sarah Byrnes (who insists on being called Sarah Byrnes, rather than just Sarah) have been friends for a long time, originally because he was extremely overweight and she was severely burned as a child, leaving her with scars on her hands and face. They were picked on regularly and began to write an underground newspaper called Crispy Pork Rinds, focusing an article on the bully Dale Thornton. After the ensuing events, they recruited Dale as “protection”, and their lives became a bit easier.

Eric is recruited to the swim team, and as he improves in skill his weight decreases. Out of fear of losing his friend Sarah Byrnes, he continues to eat, and even tries to eat as much as he can so that he can “stay fat for Sarah Byrnes”, so that he won't stop being an 'outcast' with her and lose her friendship. Eric's search for a “cure” for Sarah Byrnes’ catatonia leads him to seek out Dale Thornton, and Eric learns that she had an abusive father and that the facial scarring was no accident.

Shortly after being confronted with this information, Sarah Byrnes begins speaking to Eric, and he discovers that her catatonia has been a ruse, and that she is terrified that her father, whose abuse has been worsening, is going to kill her. She has been hiding out in the hospital because it is the only place she feels safe from him. But Virgil Byrnes appears to be on to Sarah's plan, and time is running out. Confused as to what to do, Eric reveals all to his teacher and swim coach, Ms. Lemry. She hatches a plan to hide Sarah Byrnes in the apartment above her garage.

Ms. Lemry teaches the Contemporary American Thought class, which includes discussions on abortion, suicide, religion, body image, social justice, and many other topics. Eric and his agnostic friend Steve Ellerby conflict with Mark Brittain, a devout Christian. Mark's girlfriend, Jody Mueller (also Eric's crush), secretly doesn't agree with all of his views. It is revealed that Mark encouraged her to abort his baby. Jody breaks up with Mark and starts going out with Eric. Meanwhile, during the course of this class, Mark is confronted with the truth of his actions. He has difficulty reconciling his actions with his beliefs and later attempts suicide but fails.

Ms. Lemry agrees to take Sarah Byrnes to Reno to look for her mother, who is the only witness to the abuse Sarah has suffered at the hands of her father. While they are gone, Virgil Byrnes hunts down Eric after school and threatens to kill him, and eventually stabs him in the back and cheek. Eric makes his way to Dale Thornton's house, where he passes out, and Dale and his father rescue him and take him to the hospital. Ms. Lemry and Sarah do find Sarah's mother; they have to chase her when she runs away from them. At first Sarah was angry at her mother for leaving her, but later begged her mother to come back to make up for lost time. Sarah's mother refuses to leave. When Sarah and Ms. Lemry return, Sarah attempts to run away because she doesn't want any more of her friends to get hurt, but Eric and Ms. Lemry stop her. Eric's mother's boyfriend, Carver Middleton (former Vietnam Special Forces soldier), figures out that Virgil Byrnes must be hiding out in his house and lays a trap for him, capturing him and severely injuring him, which lands Carver in jail.

== Character list ==
Eric “Moby” Calhoune: The narrator, Eric, has always struggled with his weight and the status of an outcast. He earned the nickname "Moby" because he has an extreme lung capacity; however, loses weight later on after joining the swim team. He is best friends with fellow outcast Sarah Byrnes, whose facial scarring caused her social problems. Eric is recruited by the swim coach, begins to lose weight, and fears that Sarah Byrnes will not remain friends with him if he is no longer fat.

Sarah Byrnes: Extreme facial and hand scarring result in her being a social outcast, and she has a somewhat bitter outlook on life. She becomes mute and catatonic in class one day, apparently for no reason. It is discovered that she is afraid that her father, Virgil Byrnes, is going to continue to physically abuse her as he has in the past.

Steve Ellerby: Ellerby is Eric's best male friend and a teammate on the swim team. His Christian cruiser shows blasphemy toward his dad and religion.

Dale Thornton: A bully who ends up befriending Eric Calhoune and Sarah Byrnes because of his somewhat outcast status as someone who struggled in school and eventually dropped out.

Mark Brittain: A fellow team member and classmate, and a devout Christian, Mark is somewhat of a foil for Eric and Ellerby. Ellerby is the most self-actualized, Eric is in the process, but Mark's rigid home life leads him to be easily goaded and often has his beliefs called into question. Mark attempts suicide after being unable to reconcile his beliefs with his actions.

Jody Mueller: Jody is originally Mark Brittain's girlfriend. He convinced her to have an abortion the previous year, and then blamed her for their actions as a couple. She somewhat feels the outcast stigma (internally, at least, as the abortion is a secret), and she befriends and begins dating Eric.

Ms. Cynthia Ellen Lemry: She is the swim team coach and teacher of the controversial class Contemporary American Thought. All the teen characters (except Dale Thornton) are members of her class. Ms. Lemry is Eric's mentor, and he goes to her when the problems with Sarah Byrnes surface.

Virgil Byrnes: Sarah Byrnes’ father Virgil is a violent and mentally unstable man who physically abused her when she was a child.

Carver Middleton: Eric's mother's boyfriend. Was a Vietnam War veteran and confronts Virgil Byrnes himself.

== Themes ==
Crutcher dedicates the novel "For all those who finally stand up for themselves." Every major character in the novel develops a more concrete understanding of themselves and their classmates by coming to understand that they are more than a few characteristics. Crutcher also says, through Carver Middleton, "Taking on someone else's monsters will kill you."

Body image is also thematically important. Sarah Byrnes and Eric Calhoune both have physical issues that cause people to see them differently, but they also see themselves negatively; by the end of the text, this view is proved to be erroneous.

Other themes are friendship and trust. Sarah admits that she never fully trusted Eric but learns to do so by giving him a very personal letter. Friendships are also made between Sarah Byrnes and Dale Thornton, and between Eric and Mark Brittain.

== Responses ==
=== Book challenges ===
- 2011 – A school in Belleville, Wisconsin reviewed a request from a parent to pull the book from the 9th grade curriculum because of its language, "pornographic and sexual content", and negative portrayal of Christians.
- 2005 – A school in the Westmoreland, New York school district denied a parent's request to have the book removed from the ninth-grade curriculum because of its language.
- 1995 – Smithville Public School District, in Smithville, Missouri, approved a parent's request to have the book removed from the ninth-grade curriculum, under protest from the school's Department of Communications Arts. In 2006, in honor of the book, and the change in school policies over the previous decade, the Smithville High School Chapter of the National English Honors Society is called the "Sarah Byrnes Society."
- 2001 – Columbus Grove High School in Columbus Grove, Ohio had the book removed from the ninth-grade reading list due to its "negative views of Christians". The book was brought back in 2007.
- 2023 – Selinsgrove Area Middle School in Selinsgrove, Pennsylvania had the book withdrawn from the grade 8 Advanced English class due to several students expressing discomfort with some of the issues in the book addressing abortion, suicide, abuse, religion and body issues.

=== Awards ===
1997 – California Young Reader Medal – Young Adult
1995 – Joan Fassler Memorial Book Award for Best Medical-Related Children's Book
1994 – American Library Association Best Book for Young Adults
1994 – South Dakota Library Association Young Adult Reading Program Best Books
1993 – School Library Journal Best Book
