= Takin' Place =

- Film poster
- Directed by: Cyrus Dowlatshahi
- Release date: 2015
- Country: United States
- Language: English

Takin' Place is a 2015 observational documentary film by Cyrus Dowlatshahi about daily life in the Englewood and Washington Park neighborhoods of Chicago's South side.
