= I Don't Want to Dance =

Studio album by Loftland
- Released: February 18, 2014
- Genre: Contemporary Christian music, electronic dance music, dance-pop
- Length: 34:11
- Label: Dream

I Don't Want to Dance is the first major label studio album from Loftland. Dream Records released the album on February 18, 2014.

== Critical reception ==
Professional ratings
Review scores
Source	Rating
Christian Music Review	3.5/5
Christian Music Zine	4.25/5
CM Addict	4/5 stars
Cross Rhythms	9/10 squares
HM Magazine	4/5 stars
Indie Vision Music	2/5 stars
Jesus Freak Hideout	2.5/5 stars
Jesus Wired	4/5 stars
New Release Tuesday	3.5/5 stars

Awarding the album four stars from HM Magazine, Sarah Arendas Roberts writes, "With a dash of '80s pop energy, playful rock and straightforward lyrics, Loftland's album I Don’t Want To Dance offers uplifting, upbeat dance rock." Mary Nikkel, giving the album three and a half stars for New Release Tuesday, states, "Loftland brings some impressively compelling electronic pop rock songs with an infectious optimism and enthusiasm that easily draw the listener into their slick sonic landscape." Rating the album two and a half stars at from Jesus Freak Hideout, Roger Gelwicks says, "I Don't Want to Dance, at the end of the day, lacks anything that would enhance an otherwise standard pop record."

Stephen Luff, rating the album a nine out of ten at Cross Rhythms, states, "This 10 track debut album opens the door for this talented band and promises a lot for the future." Giving the album two stars for Indie Vision Music, Jonathan Andre writes, "Sadly a forgettable album". Laura Chambers, awarding the album a 3.5 out of five from Christian Music Review, says, "While I Don’t Want To Dance has some danceable tracks and points us to hope, the songs seem to be from two different albums thematically."

Giving the album four stars at CM Addict, David Bunce says, "While not an exclusively Christian album, meaning that not every song is about God, it embraces life with vigor and youthful zest. It’s something I found quite attractive about each and every song." Joshua Andre, rating the album a 4.25 out of five for Christian Music Zine, writes, "While it takes a while to fully immerse myself and enjoy the music of the four friends, Loftland’s efforts exceed my expectations". Awarding the album a four stars from Jesus Wired, Angel Journey states, "their debut album on DREAM Records is a great composition as they wonderfully declare the love that God has for us, as well as expressing the various scenes of falling in and out of romance."

== Track listing ==
All tracks are written by Dominic Gibbs except for co-writes on Track No. 1 with Tony Wood and Track No. 3 with Mia Fieldes.

No.	Title	Length
1.	"Today Is a New Day"	3:23
2.	"Girl Like That"	3:58
3.	"How You Love Me"	3:11
4.	"Lie to Me"	3:14
5.	"Can't Get Enough"	3:37
6.	"Lovesick"	3:08
7.	"Hold On, Small One"	3:37
8.	"I Don't Want to Dance"	3:23
9.	"Runaway"	3:00
10.	"Let's Make It Loud"	3:40
Total length:		34:11
