= I Don't Wanna Dance (film) =

2021 Dutch film directed by Flynn Von Kleist

- Directed by: Flynn Von Kleist
- Written by: Jeroen Scholten van Aschat
- Starring: Yfendo van Praag; Romana Vrede
- Cinematography: Tim Kerbosch
- Edited by: Fatih Tura
- Music by: Terence Dunn
- Release dates: 23 April 2021; 10 June 2021 (cinema)
- Running time: 89 minutes
- Country: Netherlands
- Language: Dutch

I Don't Wanna Dance is a 2021 Dutch drama film directed by Flynn Von Kleist. The film is based on the real-life experiences of lead actor Yfendo van Praag. Von Kleist already made the 2017 short documentary Omdat ik Yfendo heet and the 2018 short film Crows Nest about this subject. The film premiered at the Movies That Matter Festival in The Hague.

== Plot ==
A young dancer moves back with his destructive mother.
